= Vukovar =

- City
- Grad Vukovar; City of Vukovar
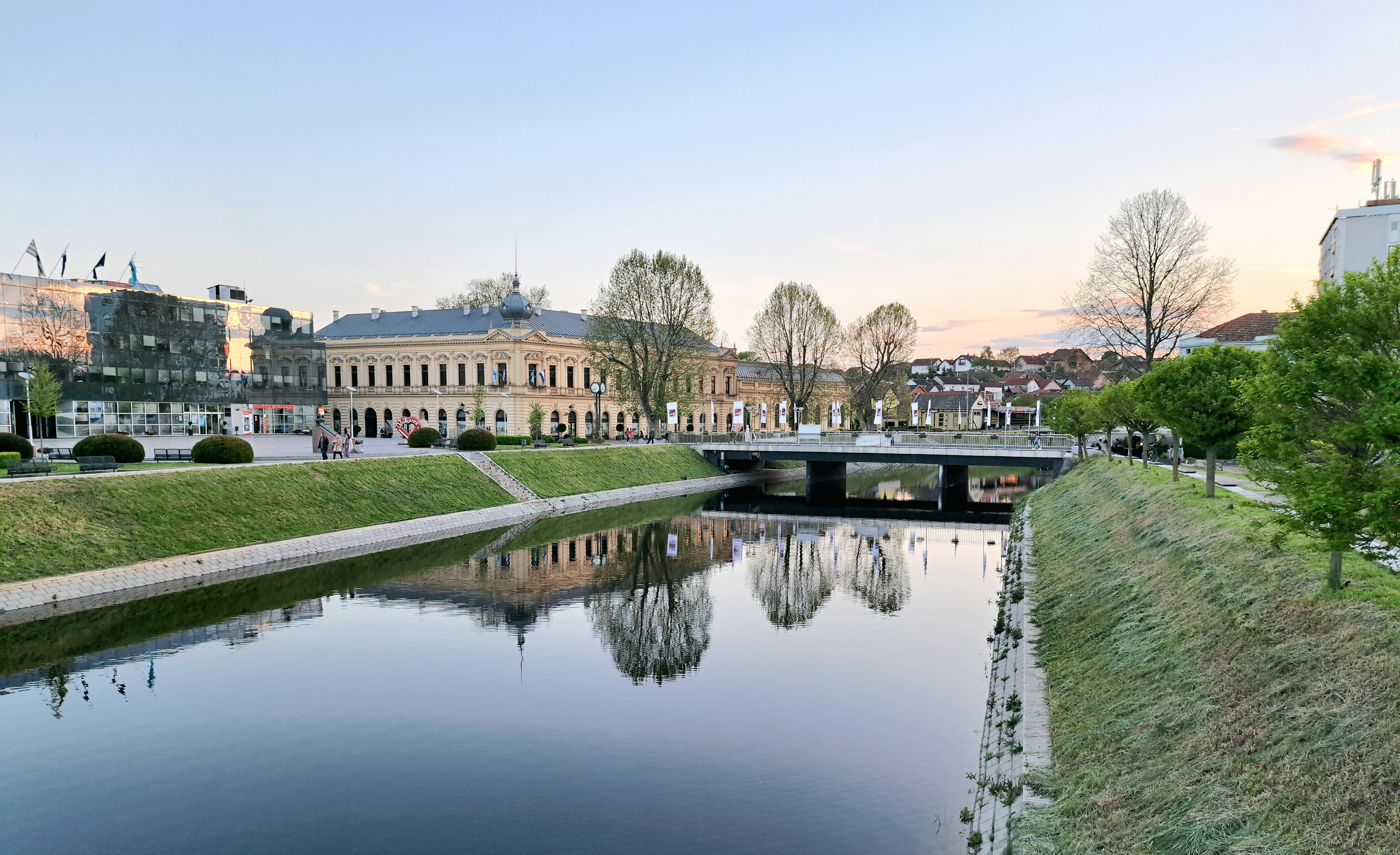
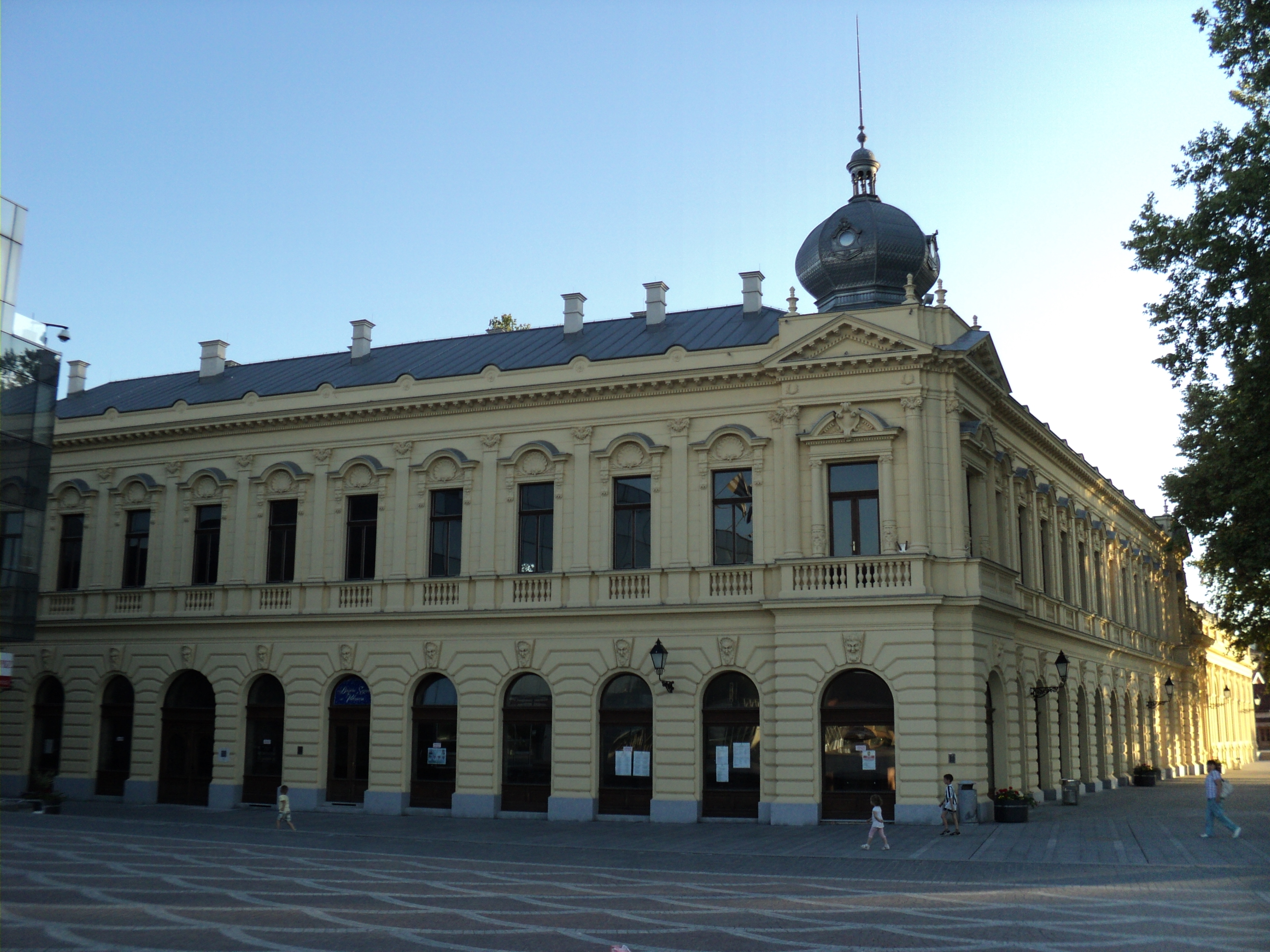
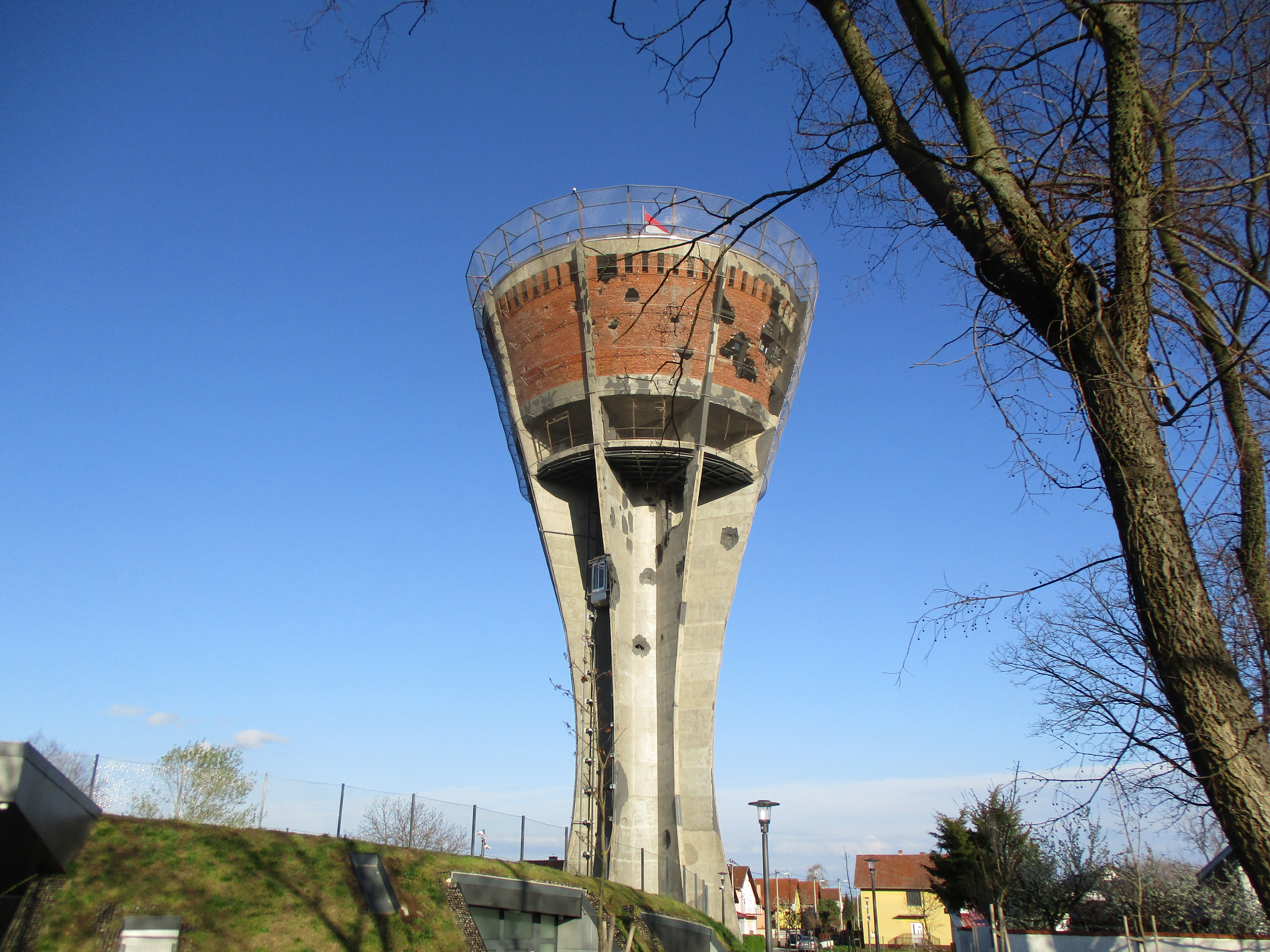
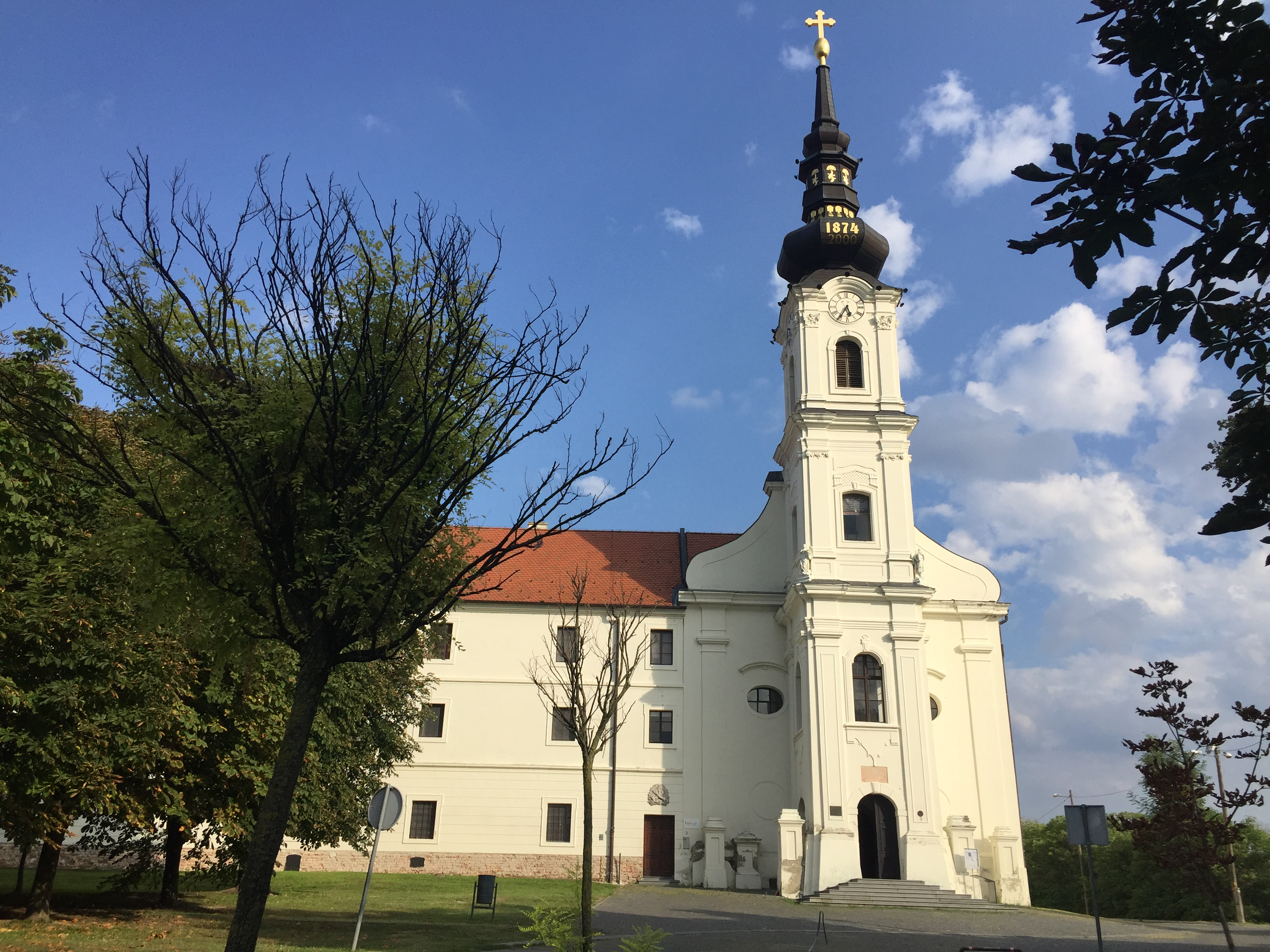
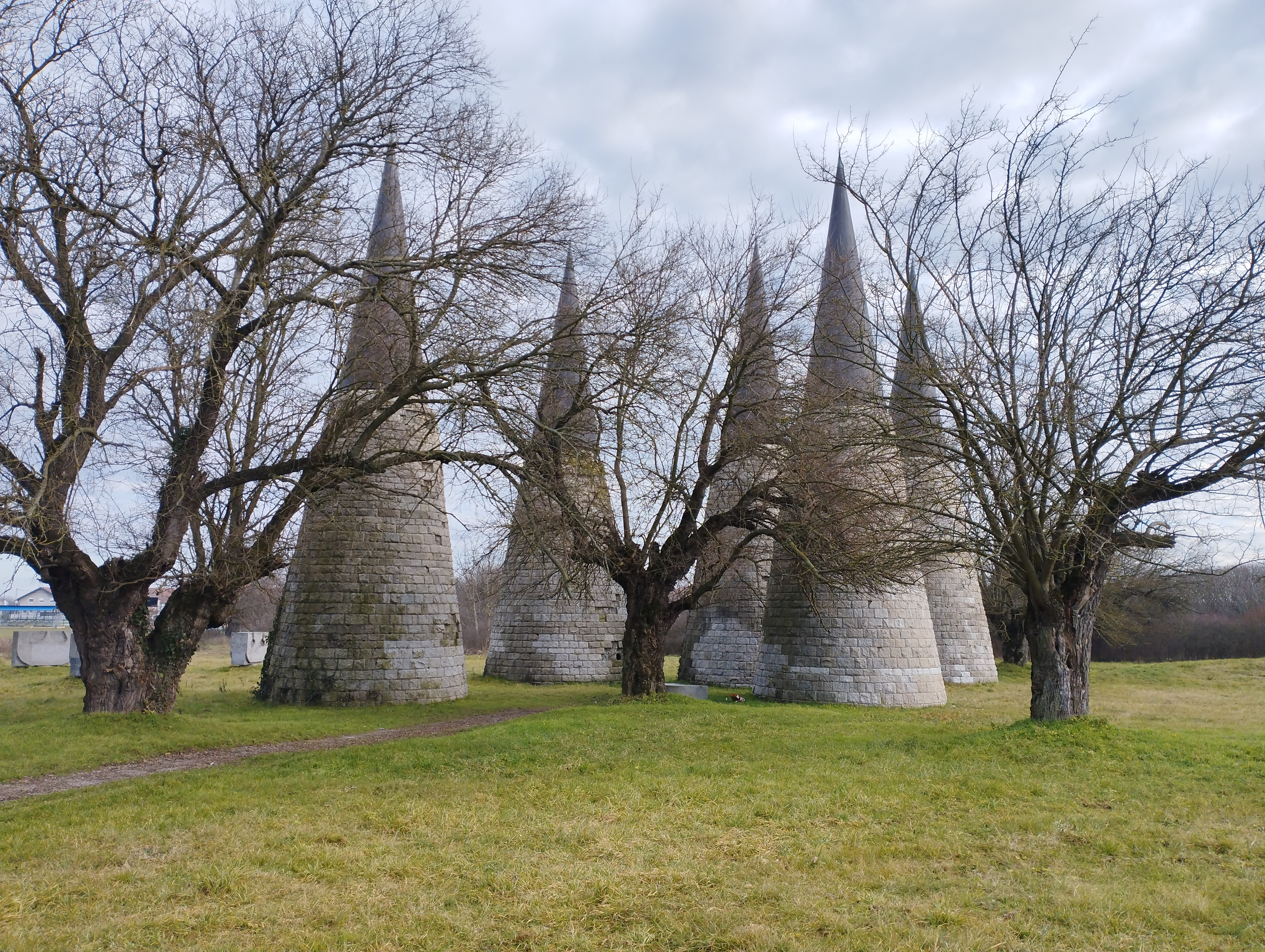
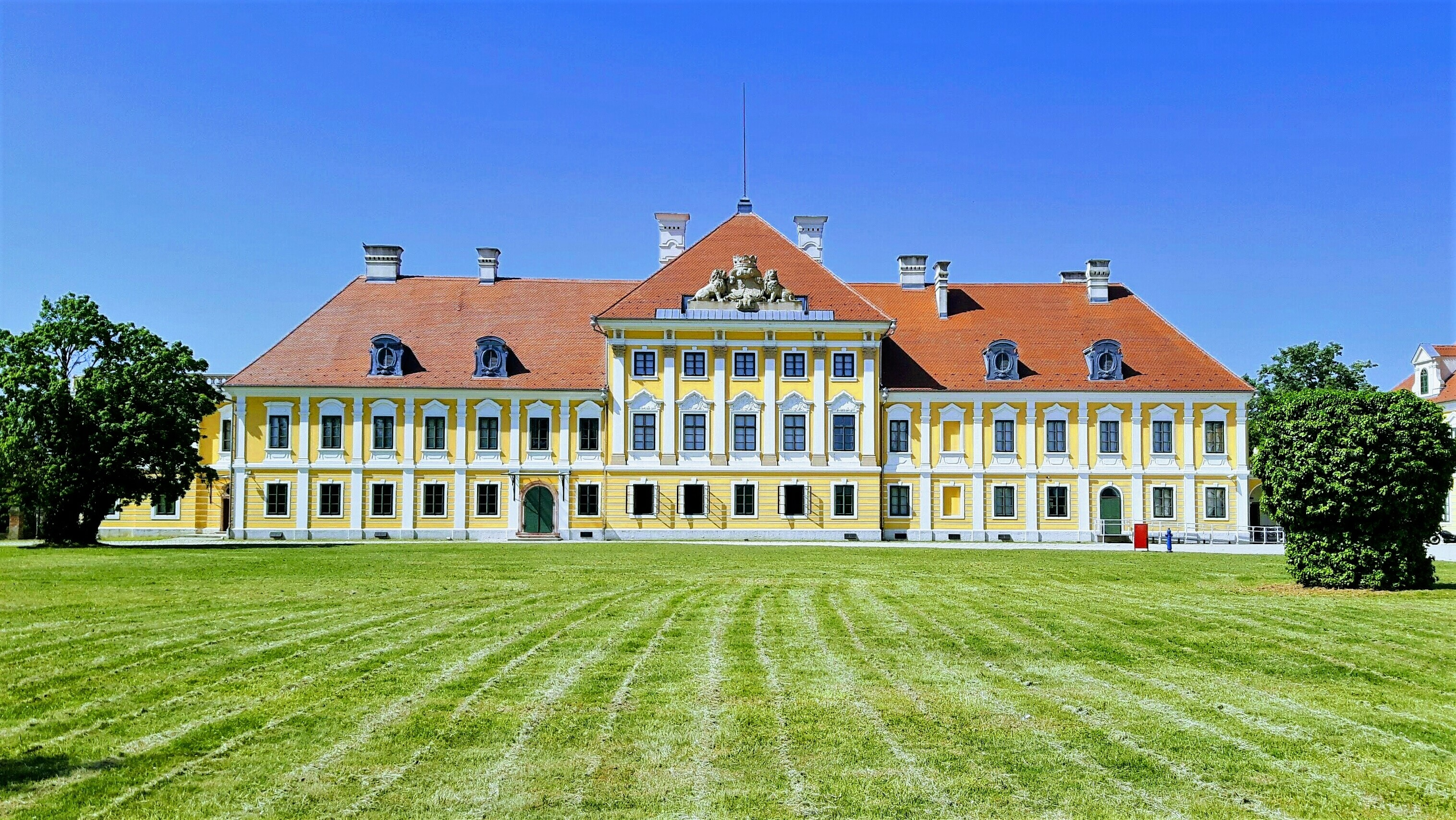
- Clockwise, from top: Vuka river and centre, Vukovar water tower; Dudik Memorial Park; Eltz Manor; Franciscan monastery with church of Saints Philip and James and Workers' Hall

- Flag Coat of arms
- Nickname: Grad Heroj (Hero City)
- Interactive map of Vukovar
- Location of Vukovar within Croatia Vukovar (Croatia)
- Coordinates: 45°20′40″N 19°00′09″E
- Country: Croatia
- Region: Slavonia (Syrmia, Podunavlje)
- County: Vukovar-Syrmia County

Government
  - Mayor: Marijan Pavliček (HS)
  - City Council: 19 members: • HS (5); • DP (4); • HDZ (3); • SDSS (2); • DSS (2); • DOMiNO (1); • SDP (1); • HNS (1)

Area
  - City: 100.1 km^{2} (38.6 sq mi)
  - Urban: 61.6 km^{2} (23.8 sq mi)
- Elevation: 108 m (354 ft)

Population (2021)
  - City: 23,175
  - Density: 231.5/km^{2} (599.6/sq mi)
  - Urban: 22,255
  - Urban density: 361/km^{2} (936/sq mi)
- Demonym(s): Vukovarac (masculine); Vukovarka (feminine)
- Time zone: UTC+1 (CET)
  - Summer (DST): UTC+2 (CEST)
- Postal code: 32 000
- Area code: 032
- Vehicle registration: VU
- Website: vukovar.hr

Vukovar (pronounced [ʋûkoʋaːr]; Serbian Cyrillic: Вуковар, Hungarian: Vukovár, German: Wukowar) is a city in Croatia, in the eastern regions of Syrmia and Slavonia. It contains Croatia's largest river port, located at the confluence of the Vuka and the Danube. Vukovar is the seat of Vukovar-Syrmia County and the second-largest city in the county after Vinkovci. The city's registered population was 22,616 in the 2021 census, with a total of 23,536 in the municipality.

== Name ==
The name Vukovar means "town on the Vuka River" (Vuko from the Vuka River, and vár from the Hungarian word for 'fortress'). The river was called Ulca in antiquity, probably from an Illyrian language. Its name might be related to the name of the river "Volga". In other languages, the city in German is known as Wukowar and in Hungarian as Vukovár or Valkóvár. In the late 17th century, the medieval Croatian name Vukovo was supplanted by the Hungarian Vukovár.

In the Middle Ages, Vukovar was the seat of the great Vukovo County, which was first mentioned in 1220 as Comitatus de Wolcou. On the right bank of the Vuka was the royal fortress castrum Walkow. A settlement developed in its suburb (suburbium), which was granted the privileges of a free royal city in 1231 by Duke Slavonia Koloman. Until the 14th century, the city was recorded in documents as Walco, Vlcou, Volkow, Walko, Wlkoy, and then the Hungarian variant of the city's name – Wolcowar (for the first time in 1323) was mentioned more and more often. Since 1691, the town has been developing on the right bank of the Vuka, initially under the name Vukovarski otok (Insula Vukovariensis); since then, the Hungarian name Vukovar has supplanted the medieval Croatian name of the city.

== Municipal area ==
The administrative municipal area of the city contains the following 4 settlements:

Settlement	2021	2011	2001
Grabovo	0	47	149
Lipovača	323	386	426
Sotin	597	782	969
Vukovar	22,255	26,468	30,126

The municipal area is divided into 9 local self-administration units, so-called local boards (Croatian: "mjesni odbor"): seven in Vukovar proper (Mitnica, Centar, Sajmište, Lužac, Trokut, Borovo naselje, Trpinjska cesta) and Sotin and Lipovača.

=== Historical development ===
In SFR Yugoslavia, the municipalities were generally larger, and the Vukovar municipality spanned the region from Vera and Borovo in the north, Ilok in the east and Tovarnik in the south, but it has since been divided into several municipalities.

Historically, Vukovar was divided into the Old Vukovar, New Vukovar and former workers' Bata village with Bata Shoes (now Borovo) factory, today known as the Vukovar suburb Borovo Naselje.

== Geography ==
The city is positioned on important transport routes. Since time immemorial transport routes from the northwest to the southeast were active in the Danube Valley through the Vukovar area.

After steam ships were introduced in the mid-19th century, and with the arrival of present-day tourist ships, Vukovar is connected with Budapest and Vienna upstream and all the way to Romania downstream. The Vukovar harbour is an important import and export station. The Danube has always been and remains the connection of the people of Vukovar with Europe and the world.

Vukovar is located 20 km (12 mi) northeast of Vinkovci and 36 km (22 mi) southeast of Osijek, with an elevation of 108 m (354 ft). Vukovar is located on the main road D2 Osijek—Vukovar—Ilok and on the Vinkovci—Vukovar railway (and road D55).

== Climate ==
Since records began in 1999, the highest temperature recorded at the local weather station was 39.8 °C (103.6 °F), on 6 August 2012. The lowest temperature was −21.8 °C (−7.2 °F), on 9 February 2012.

== History ==
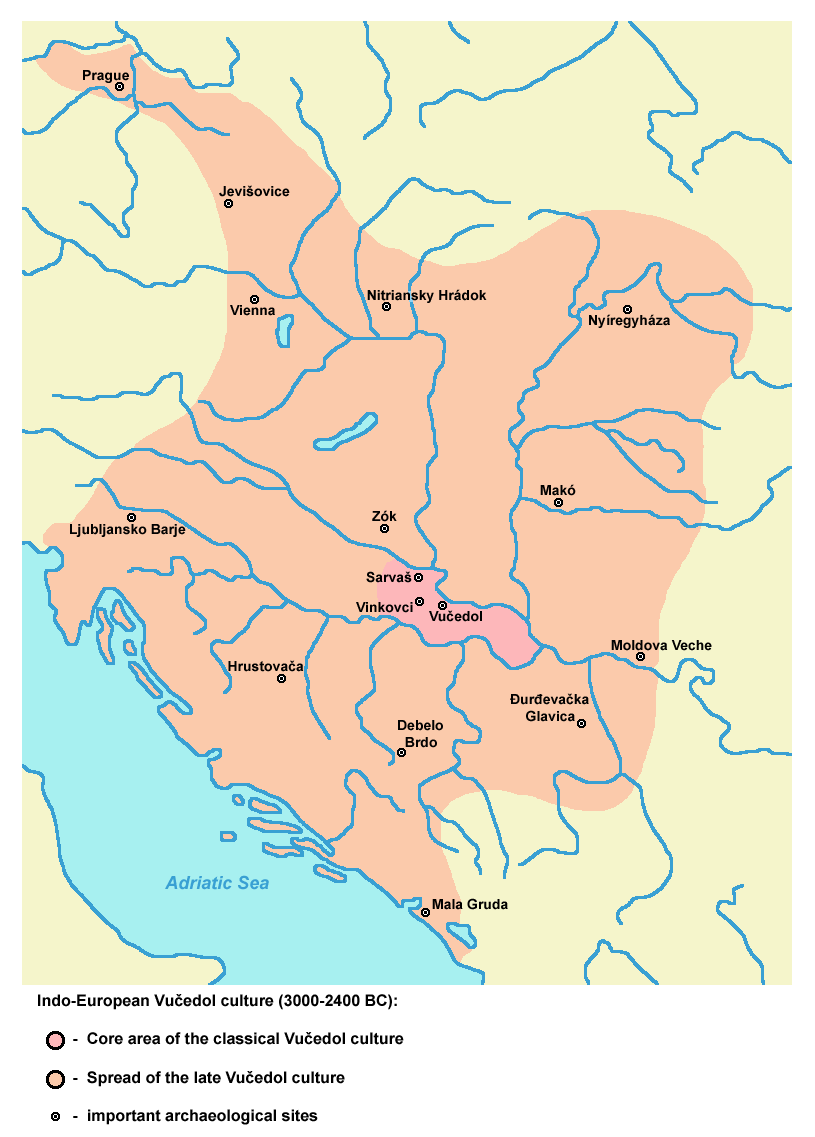
Map of the Indo-European Vučedol culture with epicenter in Vukovar, 3000–2400 BC

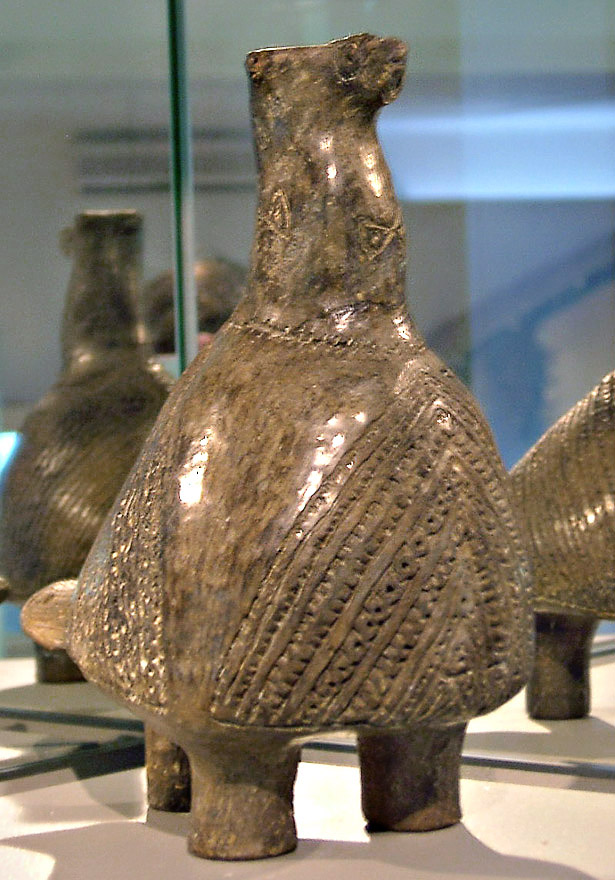
The Vučedol Dove, ritual vessel made between 2800 and 2500 BCE, a historical symbol of Vukovar

=== Prehistory ===
The area of Vukovar has been continuously inhabited for five thousand years, which we know based on numerous archaeological sites. The Vučedol culture, which developed in the Vučedol locality, is particularly significant for the Vukovar area. In 1938, the Vučedol dove was found at that location, which later became a symbol of the town. The Vučedol Orion, also found on Vučedol, is equally important and is considered the oldest Indo-European calendar. In the area of Vukovar, there are numerous archaeological sites from the Bronze, Early and Younger Iron Ages, from which we can see the way of life of the Illyrians and Celts, the original inhabitants of the Vukovar area. During the last decades of the BC era, the Romans reached the Danube in their conquests and built many forts on the border (the so-called Danube limes) as a protection against the barbarian tribes.

The Romans influenced the economy of the Vukovar region because they planted the first vineyards and drained the swamps. One Scordisci archaeological site in Vukovar dating back to late La Tène culture was excavated in the 1970s and 1980s as a part of rescue excavations in eastern Croatia. Archaeological site was a part of the settlement network of Scordisci in the area of Vinkovci.

=== Early history ===
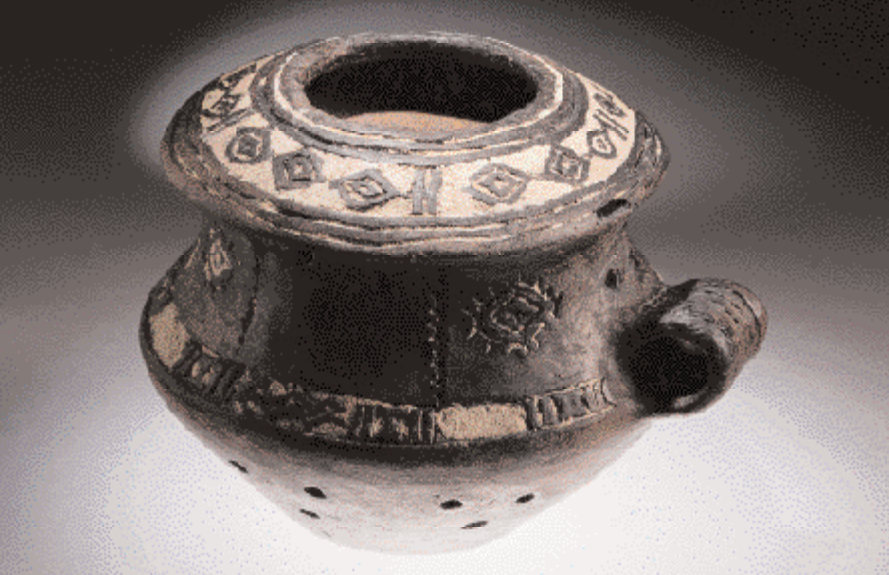
The Vučedol culture pottery, from this era, dating back 5,000 years, is characterized by its dark, polished surface, white-filled geometric incisions, and sophisticated, often zoomorphic, shapes.

The history of today's Vukovar begins very early, according to archaeological data. Slavic tribes settled in this area in the 6th century. In the 9th century the region was part of the Slavic Principality of Lower Pannonia ruled by prince Pribina, and part of the Bulgarian Empire. In the first half of the 10th century, the Vukovo fortress was looted by the Hungarians. In the 11th–12th century, the region was part of the Kingdom of Croatia; from the 13th to 16th century part of the Kingdom of Hungary; and between 1526 and 1687 under Ottoman rule.

Vukovar was mentioned first in the 13th century as Volko, Walk, Wolkov, Wolcou, Walkov and numerous other versions (original Croatian/Slavic name of the town was Vukovo). All these different forms of the city's name were used until the 14th century, when the name Vukovar began to be used more and more, to which the Hungarian suffix -var was added, which denotes a fortress. In 1231, Vukovo obtained its first privileges and later the right to levy taxes on passages along the Danube and the Vuka. In 1231, Vukovar received the status of a royal free city. Duke Koloman gave Vukovar the status of a free royal city, to encourage further development of the city. His charter meant that the residents of Vukovar were directly subject to the king, not the landowner. The charter of Duke Coloman of Slavonia confirmed the privileges that protected the people of Vukovar. From the contents of the charter, it can be seen that at that moment, an ethnically diverse population was already living in Vukovar. The inhabitants of Vukovar were engaged in trade and crafts. Vukovo County was quite densely populated in the Middle Ages. Vukovar entered the Middle Ages as a suburb with roads, and then a fortress was built. The royal administration is important for the further development of the city. The citizens of Vukovar received privileges from King Ludovik of Anjou, which included the holding of weekly fairs, which led to further stronger economic growth. Due to trade levies, the city's income also increases. The county was densely populated, and according to written sources, it had 33 forts, 34 shops and 1,182 villages, settlements and inhabited estates. Vukovar was an important church seat and a fortified city. The city occupied between 20 and 25 hectares (49 and 62 acres) of the city area. At the end of the 14th century, Vukovar was one of the largest medieval Slavonic towns with 350 houses and 2,000 to 2,500 inhabitants. During administration of the medieval Kingdom of Hungary, the town was a seat of Valkó (Croatian: Vuka) county, which was located between the Drava and Sava rivers, while during Ottoman administration it was part of the Sanjak of Syrmia. The Turkish rule brought great changes to the Vukovar region. On their campaign in 1526, the Turks occupied Ilok and Vukovar. Vukovar lost its significance, but still remained an important trade center on an important trade route. Before liberation from the Turks, Vukovar had close to 3,000 inhabitants.

=== Habsburg Monarchy ===
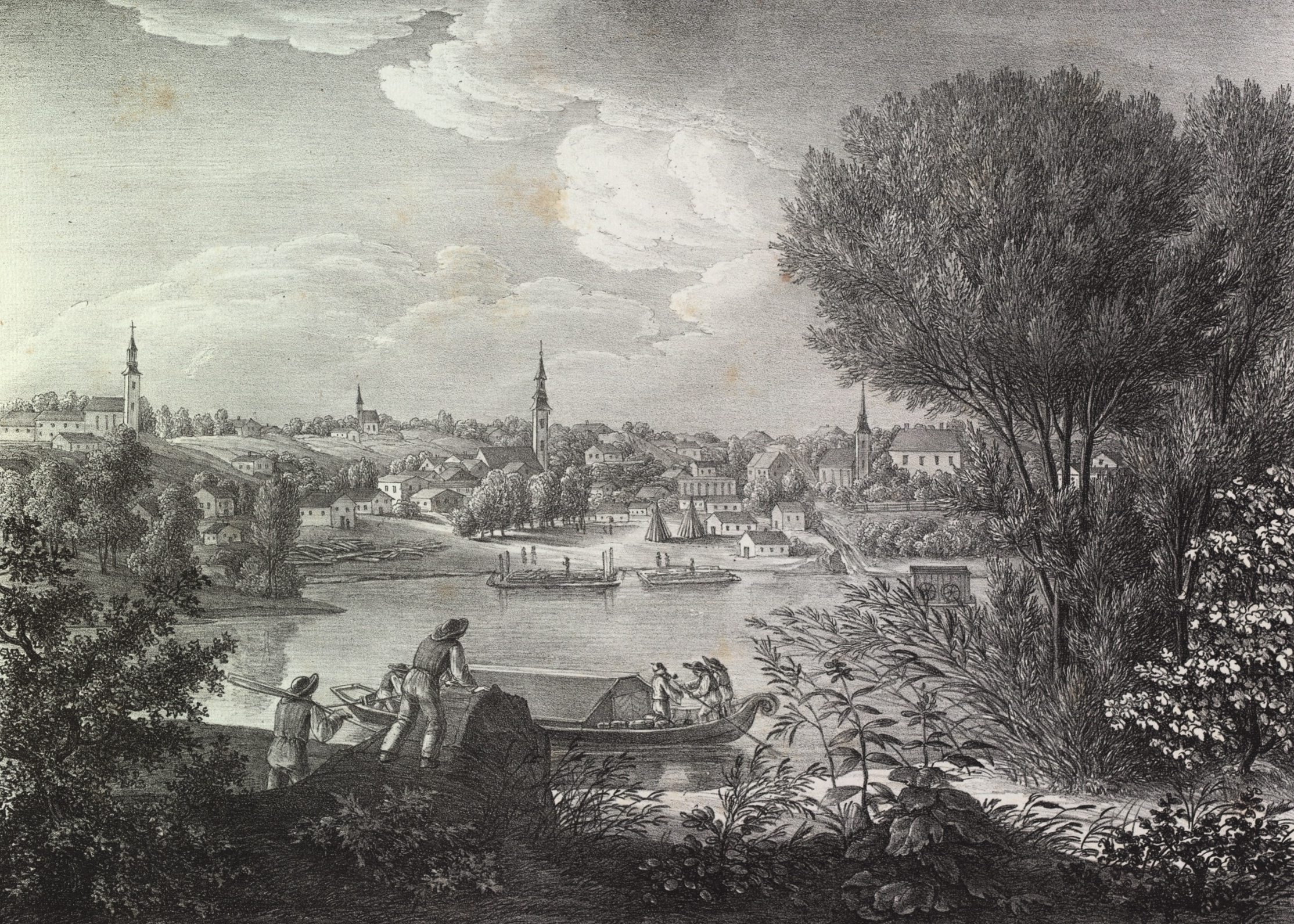
Vukovar in 1826

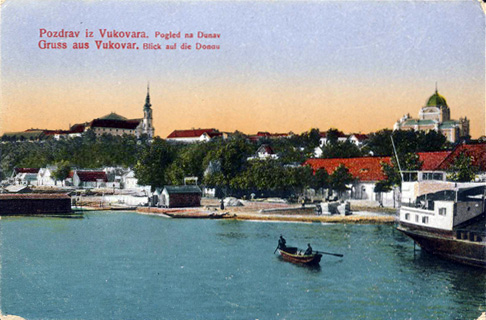
Vukovar seen from the Danube river in 1917

After the Treaty of Karlowitz in 1699, Vukovar was part of the Habsburg monarchy, Slavonia (Transleithania after the compromise of 1867), and soon after in the Kingdom of Croatia-Slavonia, created when the Kingdom of Slavonia and the Kingdom of Croatia were merged in 1868.

Vukovar was left with an almost empty town, with only about fifty houses. The indigenous population is returning to the devastated area, as well as new residents. Because of the need for labor, Orthodox Serbs are settling. In the 18th and 19th centuries, a considerable number of Germans, Hungarians, Jews, Ruthenians, Slovaks and Ukrainians arrived. Thus, Vukovar becomes a multinational city.

After the end of the Ottoman domination (in the 16th and 17th centuries), the German Counts of Eltz bought a large part of the Vukovar area which was known as the Lordship of Vukovar and for the next two centuries they would have a great influence on the economy and culture of Vukovar.

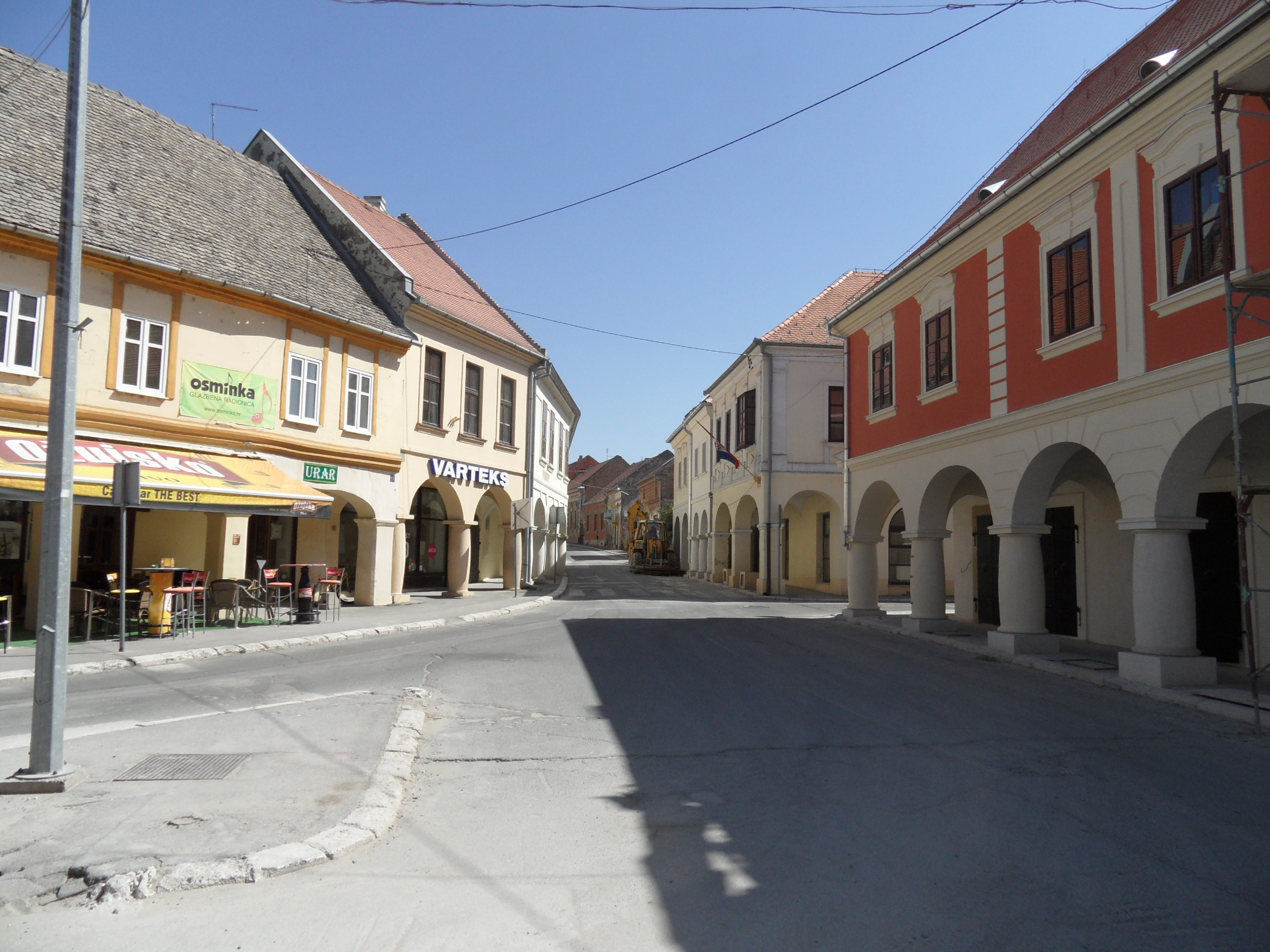
Townhouses with arches in the center of the city

Counts Eltz, German nobility, come into possession of the manor in Vukovar. Philip Karl Eltz, Archbishop of Mainz, in 1736 buys this huge property with more than 30 inhabited places.

At the beginning of this period, almost half of the inhabitants of Vukovar were craftsmen and merchants. Crafts, trade, shipbuilding are developing. Goods are shipped to the Danube countries by ship. Numerous guild organizations were founded to protect craftsmen. Vukovar is the main center of trade for the entire western Srijem.

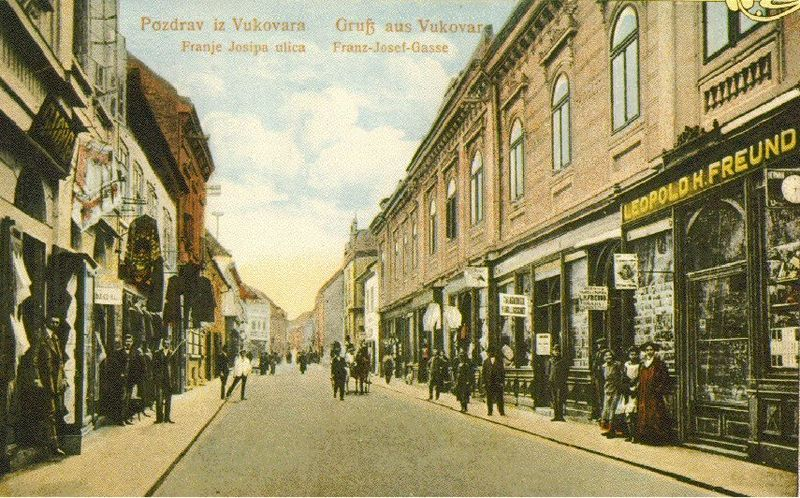
Vukovar in Austria-Hungary, Franz Joseph I street

The Vukovar area has very good conditions for agriculture. Almost 80% of the population lived from agriculture. In addition to basic grain production, viticulture is also important, and horse studs are also famous.

Since 1840, Vukovar has had permanent steamboat lines on the Danube, and since 1878 it has been connected to the railway. The port of Vukovar is the largest port in Croatia. The industry developed slowly due to lack of capital.

According to the population census from 1900, Vukovar has 10,400 inhabitants, including about 4,000 Croats, 3,500 Germans, about 1,600 Serbs, 950 Hungarians, etc. In 1905, the first major industrial enterprise, the spinning mill, began operating in Vukovar.

In 1745, Vukovar became the seat of the Syrmia County of the Kingdom of Slavonia and from 1868 Kingdom of Croatia-Slavonia.

=== Kingdom of Yugoslavia ===
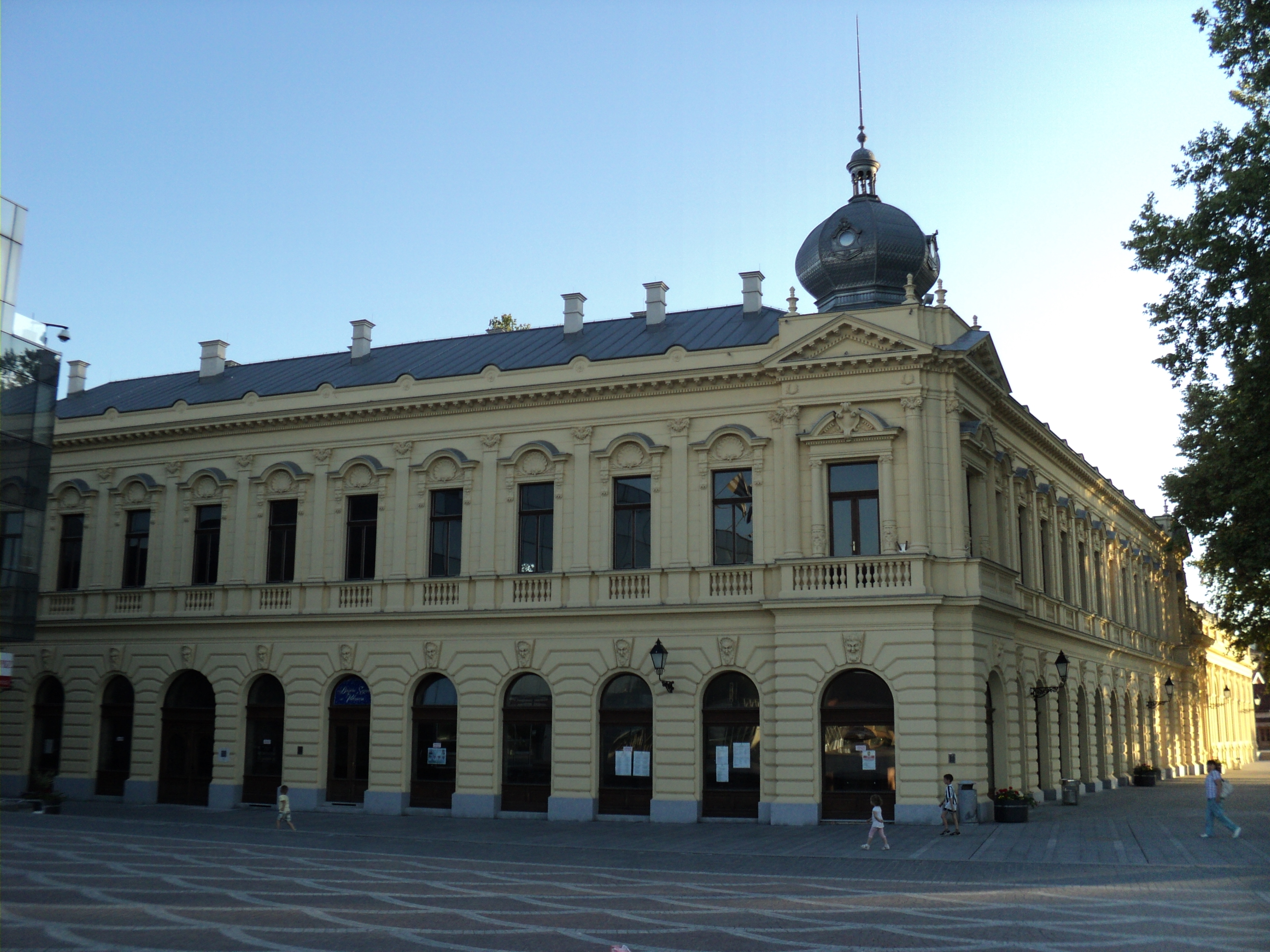
Workers' Hall after the reconstruction. Historical second congress of the Communist Party of Yugoslavia was held in Workers' Hall, Vukovar in 1920.

In 1918, Vukovar became part of the newly formed Kingdom of Serbs, Croats, and Slovenes (Yugoslavia in 1929). Between 1918 and 1922, Vukovar was the administrative seat of the county of Syrmia (Srijem), and between 1922 and 1929 it was the administrative seat of Syrmia Oblast. Despite the status of administrative center the settlement will get the city status only on 23 November 1919, by the decision of regent of the new state Peter I of Serbia. After the creation of the Kingdom of Serbs, Croats and Slovenes and in the wake of communism gaining popularity throughout Europe, Vukovar became the location of the 2nd congress of the Socialist Labor Party of Yugoslavia (Communists) (Socijalistička radnička partija Jugoslavije – komunista), where it was renamed the Communist Party of Yugoslavia (Komunistička partija Jugoslavije). In 1920, ahead of the local elections, the Jewish Party was established in the town while Zionist Association was founded in 1926. After 1929, Vukovar was part of the Sava Banovina, and beginning in 1939 it was part of the Banovina of Croatia. Part of the Serb community in the town and neighbouring villages was dissatisfied with the inclusion in the new autonomous Banovina leading them to present their disagreement in the 1939 Vukovar resolution.

The interwar period in Vukovar was marked with a significant growth of the shoe and textile industry that began operating in the town, including the shoe factory Bata in 1931, which was later renamed Borovo. This consequently led to a population growth–according to the 1948 census, Vukovar had over 17,000 inhabitants.

=== World War II ===
Croats and Serbs tensions in the town escalated during the latter half of the 1930s. An incident in 1937 involved a Serb student bringing a pistol to Vukovar High School and threatening to kill a Croat classmate. At the time of 1938 Yugoslavian parliamentary election, Vukovar's Ustaša used a slogan referencing an Ustaša paramilitary training camps in Hungary. After the Croat-led coalition won the town election, a group of Croat high school students celebrated the victory by chanting pro-Croatian and anti-Yugoslav sentiments in the streets. The local newspaper Srijemski Hrvat, which was published in Vukovar from November 1939 to January 1941, showed a clear increase in Ustašist influence as the Kingdom of Yugoslavia approached its collapse. Although it was officially aligned with the Croatian Peasant Party (HSS), its editor, Luka Puljiz, was a committed Ustaša and leader in the movement's local cell. On 15 November 1939 Srijemski Hrvat discussed local Germans' support for the central government in Belgrade and invited them to back the Croatian Peasant Party-led regime in Zagreb instead. While it mentioned Germans, Hungarians, Czechs, Ukrainians, and Slovaks as relevant national minorities, Jews, Serbs, and Roma were notably excluded. On 5 November 1939 Nikola Andrić gave a speech asserting that Croatian ethnic songs were not only better than Serbian ones but also the best among all the world's cultures.

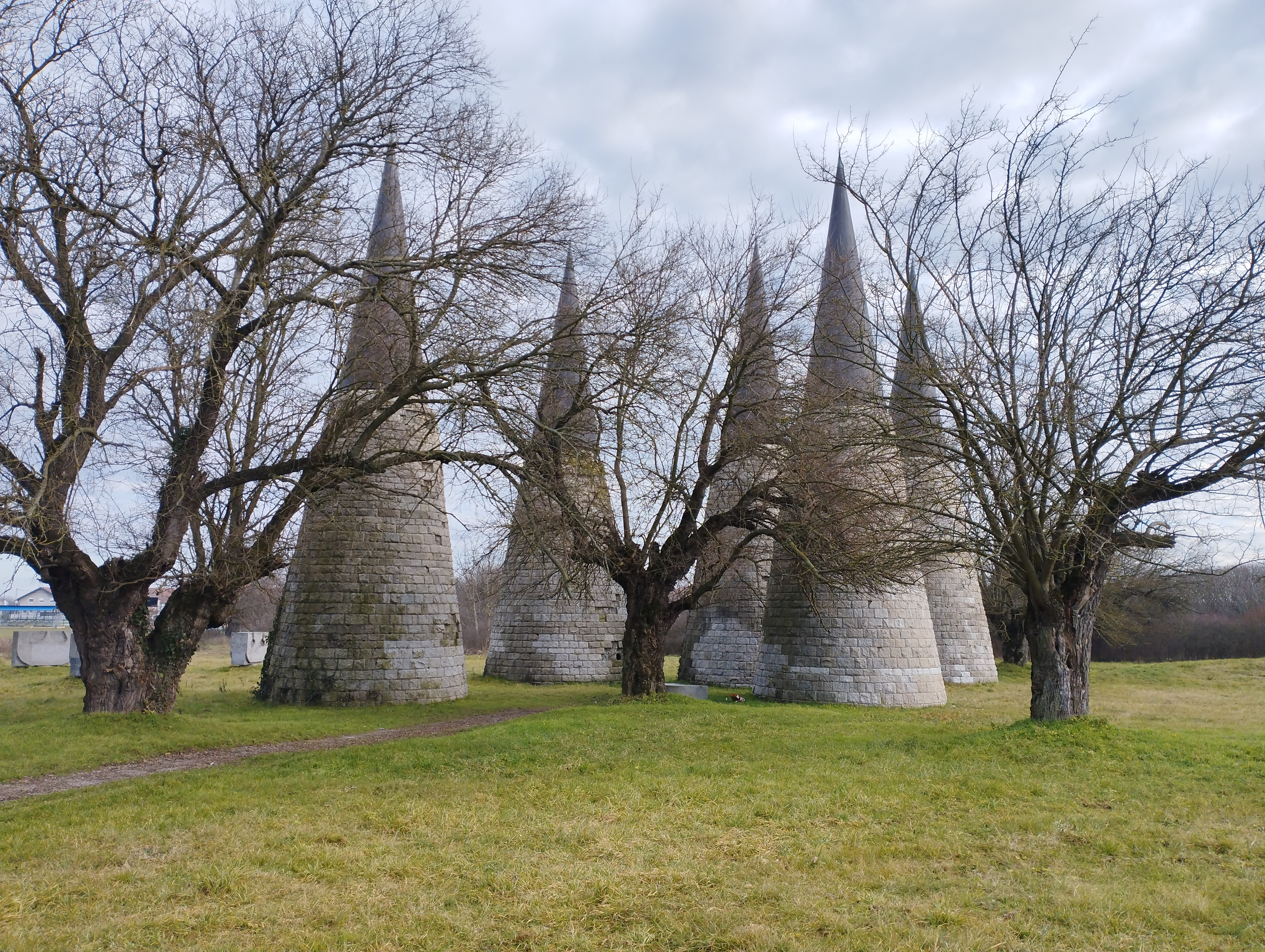
Dudik Memorial Park

After 1941 Yugoslav coup d'état Luka Puljiz, editor of Srijemski Hrvat, received advance instructions on the procedure of the town capture following the Invasion of Yugoslavia. When the Independent State of Croatia was declared on 10 April 1941, following morning Puljiz group took control of Vukovar by seizing key locations such as the post office, police station, and town hall. The Ustaša authorities across the NDH began issuing anti-Jewish and anti-Serb laws, effectively placing both groups outside the law. On 10 April 1941, a decree barred Serbs and Jews from serving in the NDH army. A subsequent decree on 17 April 1941, allowed for arrests based on "anti-Croat" activities without specifying exact crimes. Further decrees on 18 April 1941, targeted Serbs and Jews, nullifying legal contracts involving Jews and preparing for the deportation of Serb agricultural colonists. On 19 April 1941, the regime appointed commissioners to Jewish and Serb firms. Additionally local Ustašas executed several individuals suspected of anti-Croat activities. More decrees suspended judiciary staff and public employees, giving the state the power to dismiss Jews, Serbs, and Croats with Yugoslav affiliations. Decree on the Prohibition of the Cyrillic Script was introduced on 25 April 1941. Ustaša regime spread its ideology in Vukovar through various means, including the weekly newspaper Hrvatski Borac ("Croat Fighter"), which circulated from December 1941 to June 1942. The paper was edited by Dr. Vilko Anderlić, a Catholic priest from a nearby village of Sotin.

In the Vukovar area, Ustaša authorities did not immediately launch large-scale killings against Serb communities in the first mass killing phase from April to May 1941 which targeted area that lacked significant economic value. Wealthier regions such as Vukovar saw a more restrained approach, as peace and order were crucial for the continuity of industry and agriculture. Mass shootings in town began in late July 1941 after the first act of resistance in the Serb village of Bobota. The following day, the Ustaša forces encircled the village, interrogated and terrorized the inhabitants, and arrested 45 people. Thirty of them were sent to the Jadovno concentration camp, while 15 were sentenced to death by a hastily convened traveling summary court and execution being carried at the Dudik site. Over 500 people will be executed at the site during the war with the place being turned into the Dudik Memorial Park subsequently. Repression led to further resistance and imprisonment of 500 residents of Bobota, Trpinja and Vera in September 1941.

During World War II the city was bombed by the Allies. The first Yugoslav Partisans uprising in the district (kotar) of Vukovar happened on 26 August 1941, in the village of Bobota with subsequent continued dominant role of ethnic Serbs in the uprising who will constitute 75% of Yugoslav Partisans in the area as of late 1943. Today, Dudik Memorial Park commemorates 455 individuals who were executed by the authorities of the Independent State of Croatia during the World War II in Yugoslavia. The monument at the Dudik Memorial Park, built from 1978 to 1980, is designed by Bogdan Bogdanović, for which he won the International Piranesi Award. At least 1,027 soldiers of the Bulgarian Armed Forces who fought on Syrmian Front died during the liberation of Vukovar and related fights and are today commemorated at the local Bulgarian Military Cemetery. An additional monument was erected in Borovo Naselje to commemorate the soldiers of the Yugoslav and the Soviet Red Army who lost their lives in the liberation of the region between 8 and 12 April 1944. The monument was built by workers from the Borovo factory. Vukovar's memorial ossuary contains the remains of 388 victims transferred from the Dudik memorial area, including 155 soldiers from the Fifth Vojvodina Strike Brigade and 62 Red Army soldiers. In 2008 an unexploded bomb was found in the city from this period.

=== SFR Yugoslavia ===
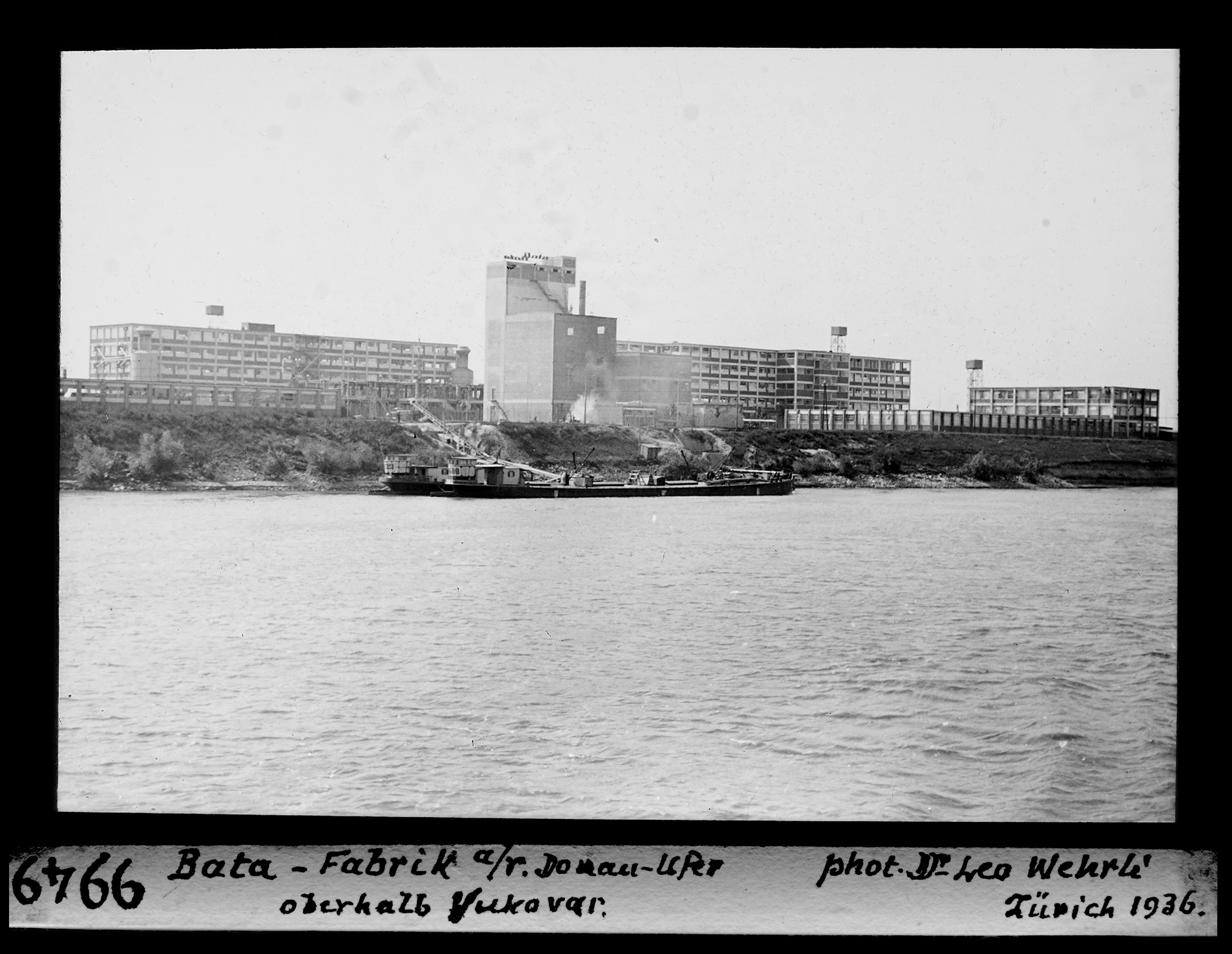
Borovo factory complex and river port on the Danube in Vukovar, 1936

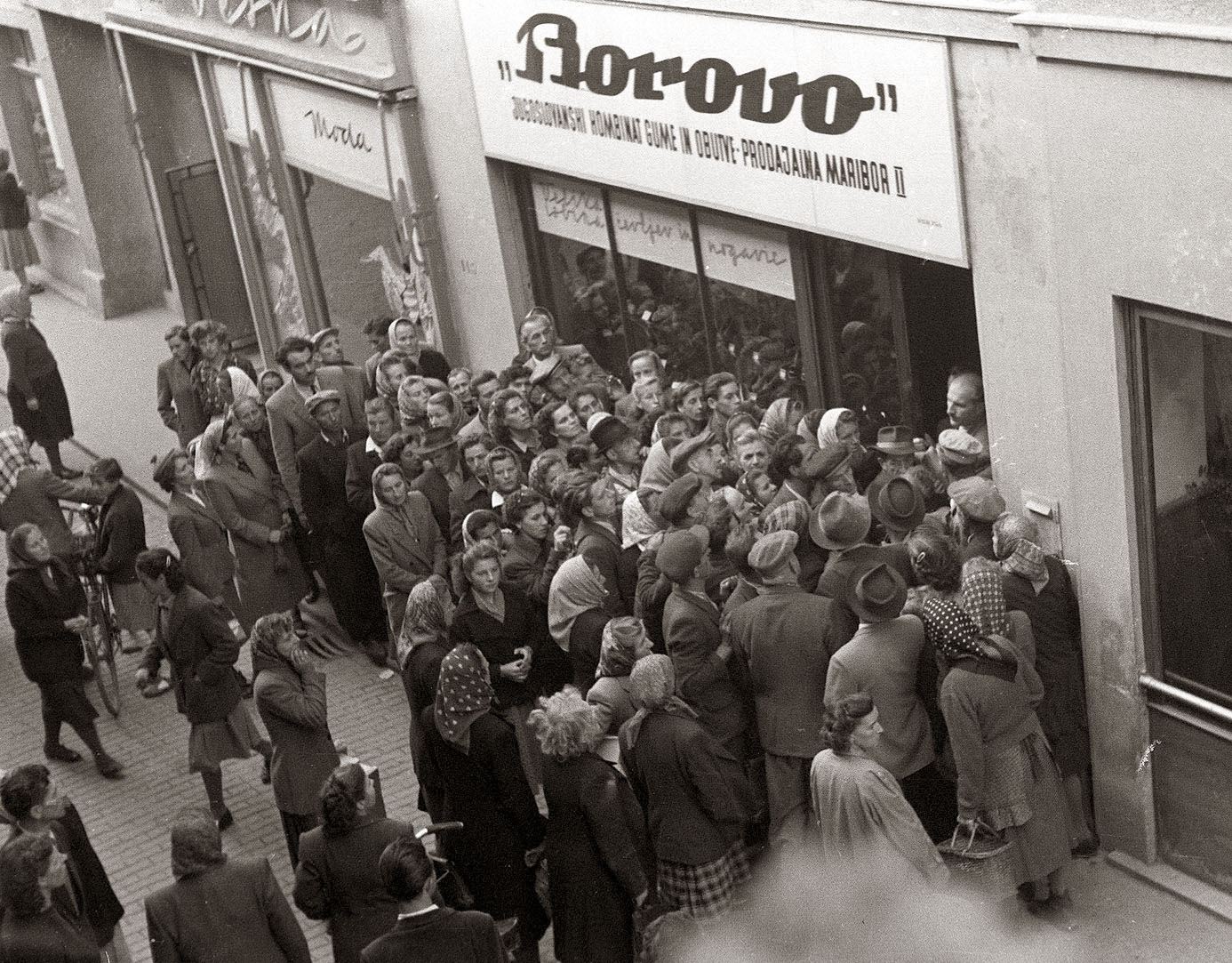
Crowds in front of the Borovo store in Gospodska Street in Maribor, 1955

Between 1945 and 1991, Vukovar was part of the Socialist Republic of Croatia within the new Socialist Federal Republic of Yugoslavia. During this period Vukovar developed into a multicultural community and an important industrial centre with a standard of living among the highest in Yugoslavia. One of the symbols of this industrialization was the Borovo company with over 22,000 employees in the late 1980s. The company already reached its prewar employment levels in 1949, with the number of employees growing to 5,215 in 1955 and 10,572 in 1965, many of whom were from surrounding villages as well as from the rest of Slavonia, Vojvodina and other parts of Yugoslavia. Separate production sites were open in Prijedor, Sombor, Donji Miholjac, Odžak and Lovas with 622 shops all around the country. At its peak, the company contributed 3/4 of the municipal tax revenue. Following the 1970s energy crisis the company started producing for other companies in the world including for Puma in 1979.

As the economic crisis in the country deepened workers from Borovo started their first strike action, which lasted between 19 and 24 August 1987. The "Large Strike" (Croatian: Veliki štrajk) started on 2 July 1988, with daily rallies at the Republic Square in front of the Workers’ Hall. On evening of 5 July 1988, a group of workers decided to travel to Belgrade to share their dissatisfaction with the federal institutions, with formal union buses and trucks joining this action once the initial group already reached Tovarnik. At 3 am next day a group of 1,500 workers arrived at the Dom Sindikata where they kept trying to present their case until 9 am, to no avail. They decided to move their action to the nearby building of the Parliament of Yugoslavia afterwards. After nobody addressed them for hours the group decided to push through the police cordons and to enter the building of parliament while singing "Druže Tito, da ti je ustati, pa da vidiš kako narod pati" (Comrade Tito if only you could raise and see how the people suffer). They stayed in the building until 5 pm, meeting with the President of the Presidency from SR Croatia Ivo Latin, president of the Trade Union of Yugoslavia Marjan Orožen and the President of the Assembly Dušan Popovski. After that, they returned to Dom Sindikata from where they returned to Vukovar late at night.

=== Croatian War of Independence ===
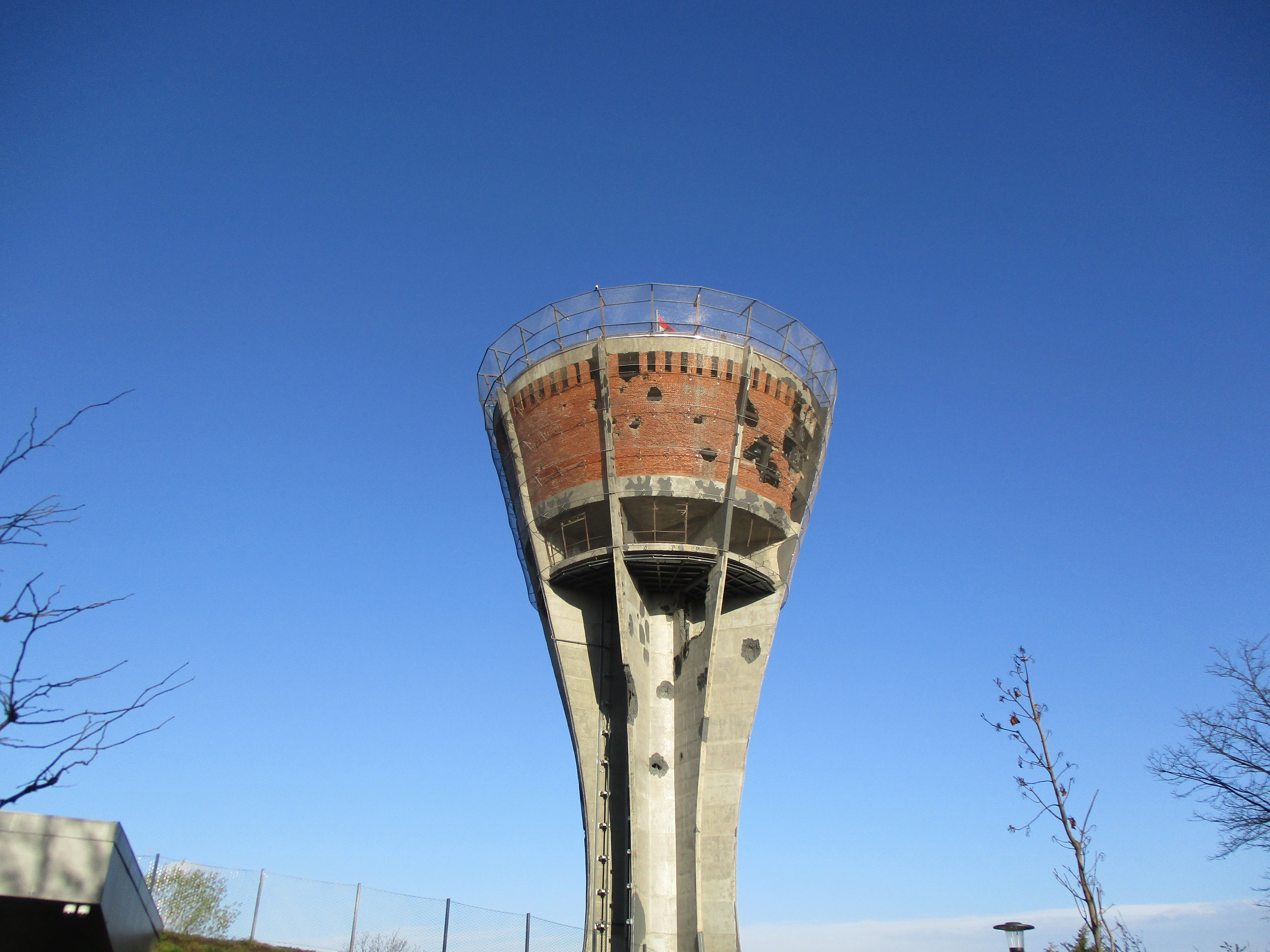
Vukovar water tower, a symbol of the suffering of the city and the Croatian War of Independence

The conflict between Serbs and Croats spread to eastern Slavonia in early 1991. On 1 April, Serb villagers around Vukovar and other towns in eastern Slavonia began to erect barricades across main roads. The White Eagles, a Serbian paramilitary group led by Vojislav Šešelj, moved into the Serb-populated village of Borovo Selo just north of Vukovar. On 2 May in the Battle of Borovo Selo, Serb paramilitaries ambushed two Croatian police buses in the centre of Borovo Selo, killing 12 policemen and injuring 22 more. One Serb paramilitary was also killed.

On 19 May 1991, a Croatian nationwide referendum on sovereignty was held in which 94% voted in favour. Violence in and around Vukovar worsened after the independence referendum, with gun and bomb attacks reported in the town and surrounding villages in June 1991. Borovo Naselje, the Croatian-held northern suburb of Vukovar, sustained a significant shelling on 4 July. Serb paramilitaries expelled thousands of non-Serbs from their homes in the municipality.

In the summer of 1991, Tomislav Merčep, at the time a leading official in the Croatian Democratic Union (HDZ) and Secretary of People's Defense, was put in charge of the town. Ethnic Serbs in Vukovar were subjected to forced interrogations, kidnappings and summary executions in addition to having their homes and cafes blown up. NGOs in the city state that a total of 86 Serbs were killed or disappeared during Merčep's control of the town. Serbs have long voiced their concerns about the crimes committed against them in the months before the JNA took over the town after its fall in November of that year and the lack of accountability for the perpetrators. The matter has remained unresolved, with Merčep only being sentenced in 2017 for crimes committed by his units elsewhere. He died in November 2020.

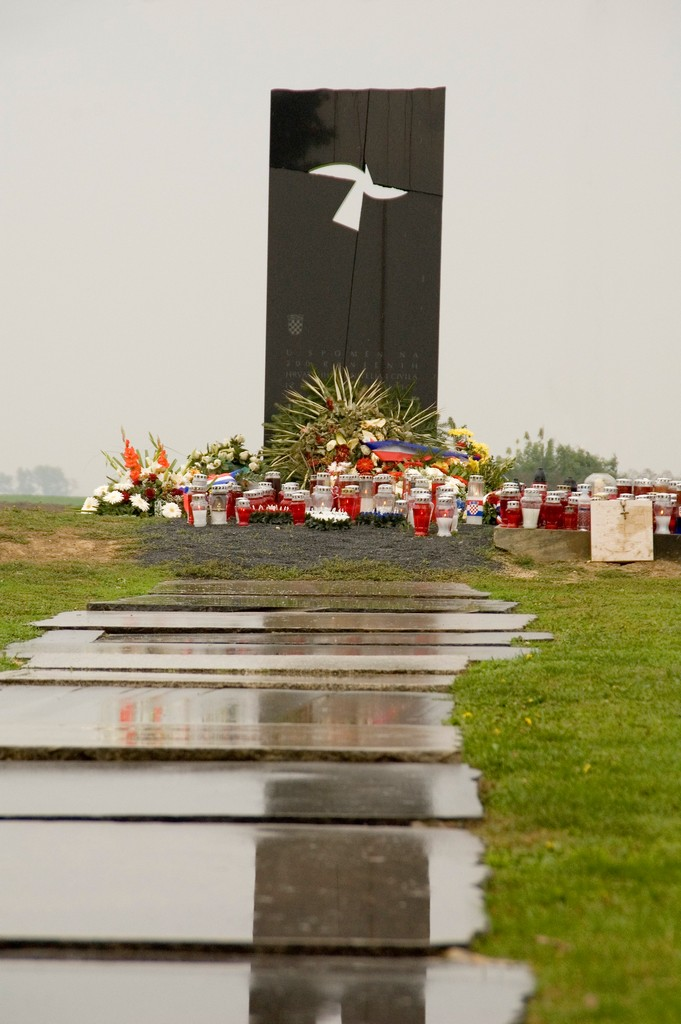
Ovčara Massacre Memorial to the murdered Croatian civilians at the site of the largest mass grave of the Croatian war of independence, on the farm Ovčara near Vukovar, where paramilitary units and members of the JNA carried out a mass slaughter of civilians from the "Dr Juraj Njavro" National Memorial Hospital

The Battle of Vukovar began on 25 August 1991, and lasted until 18 November 1991. During the battle for the town, 1,800 self-organised lightly armed defenders and civilian volunteers (the army of Croatia was still in its infancy at this time) defended the city for 87 days against approximately 36,000 troops of the Serb-dominated JNA equipped with heavy armour and artillery who lost 110 vehicles and tanks and dozens of planes during the battle. The city suffered heavy damage during the siege and was eventually overrun. It is estimated that 1,800 defenders of Vukovar and civilians were killed, 800 went missing and 22,000 civilians were forced into exile. Several war crimes were committed by Serb forces after the battle, including the Vukovar massacre of up to 264 wounded patients and medical staff, taken from the Vukovar hospital. According to the Croatian Association of Prisoners in Serbian Concentration Camps, a total of 8,000 Croatian civilians and POWs (many following the fall of Vukovar) went through Serb prison camps such as Sremska Mitrovica camp, Velepromet camp, Stajićevo camp, Begejci camp, Niš camp and many others where many were heavily abused and tortured. A total of 300 people never returned from them. A total of 4570 camp inmates have started legal action against the former Republic of Serbia and Montenegro (now Serbia) for torture and abuse in the camps.

The damage to Vukovar during the siege has been called the worst in Europe since World War II, drawing comparisons with Stalingrad. The city's water tower, riddled with bullet holes, was retained by city planners to serve as a testimony to the events of the early 1990s.

On 18 November 2006, approximately 25,000 people from all over the country gathered in Vukovar for the 15th anniversary of the fall of the city to commemorate those who were killed during the siege. A museum dedicated to the siege was opened in the basement of a now rebuilt hospital that had been damaged during the battle.

On 27 September 2007, the International Criminal Tribunal for the former Yugoslavia convicted two former JNA officers, Mile Mrkšić and Veselin Šljivančanin, for their involvement in the Vukovar massacre. The International Criminal Tribunal for the former Yugoslavia's last remaining fugitive, Goran Hadžić, was captured by Serbian authorities in 2011. Hadžić was indicted on 14 counts, including multiple related to Vukovar. The charges included criminal involvement in the "deportation or forcible transfer of tens of thousands of Croat and other non-Serb civilians" from Croatian territory between June 1991 and December 1993, including 20,000 from Vukovar; the forced labour of detainees; the "extermination or murder of hundreds of Croat and other non-Serb civilians" in ten Croatian towns and villages including Vukovar; and the "torture, beatings and killings of detainees", including 264 victims seized from Vukovar Hospital. His trial was abandoned in 2014 after being diagnosed with terminal brain cancer; he died two years later at the age of 57.

=== Vukovar under Serb control and subsequent UNTAES administration ===
The battle exhausted the JNA and proved a turning point in the Croatian War of Independence. A ceasefire was declared a few weeks later. Vukovar served as de facto seat of the self-proclaimed Serbian Autonomous Oblast of the SAO Eastern Slavonia, Baranja and Western Syrmia, the entity which joined the separatist self-declared proto-state Republic of Serbian Krajina (RSK) in 1992 as an exclave. Vojislav Stanimirović served as a mayor of Vukovar at that time. Croat refugees from the town were located at refugee centers around the country and the community published the Vukovarske Novine (Vukovar Newspaper) outside of the town. When the main portion of the RSK was defeated in 1995 Operation Storm the new agreement was reached for peaceful settlement of the conflict in Vukovar and the rest of Croatian Podunavlje area known as the Erdut Agreement. By 1996, Vukovar became demilitarised after local Serb units demobilised and transferred their heavy weapons across the border to Yugoslavia. The agreement led to the establishment of the United Nations Transitional Administration for Eastern Slavonia, Baranja and Western Sirmium (UNTAES) which effectively governed the region from its seat in Vukovar until 1998 when the region was fully reintegrated into Croatia.

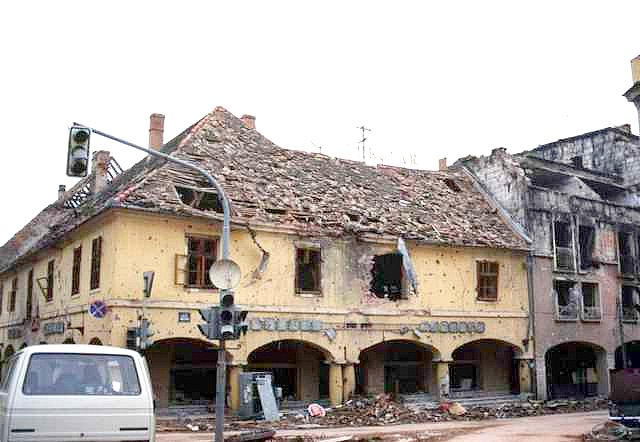
Vukovar during the occupation, under the administration of the Republic of Serbian Krajina

UNTAES headquarters were initially located at the United Nations Protection Force headquarters in Zagreb but the idea of priority of the administration was to move it to eastern Croatia. The Croatian Government offered Osijek for that purpose but the administration refused it since it wanted to locate it on the territory under its control leading to selection of Vukovar. United States Secretary of State Madeleine Albright visited Vukovar in early 1996 to express her support to the process of reintegration where she was attacked by the Serbian population with eggs and stones at the local market. UNTAES facilitated reintegration by gradual transition and invitation of Croatian officials so that in late 1996 Croatian president Franjo Tuđman visited Vukovar for the first time where he participated in the meeting between Serb and Croat delegation. Tuđman visited Vukovar again on 8 June 1997, in what was known as the Train of Peace.

As a result of the conflict, a deep ethnic divide exists between the Croat and Serb populations. The OSCE Mission to Croatia was active in Vukovar and surrounding areas until 2007.

== Demographics ==
Historical population of Vukovar
Year	Pop.	±%
1857	8,162	—
1869	9,453	+15.8%
1880	10,234	+8.3%
1890	11,205	+9.5%
1900	11,557	+3.1%
1910	12,149	+5.1%
1921	12,116	−0.3%
1931	12,738	+5.1%
1948	18,994	+49.1%
1953	20,616	+8.5%
1961	25,763	+25.0%
1971	38,830	+50.7%
1981	41,959	+8.1%
1991	46,735	+11.4%
2001	31,670	−32.2%
2011	27,683	−12.6%
2021	23,536	−15.0%
Source: Naselja i stanovništvo Republike Hrvatske 1857–2001, DZS, Zagreb, 2005 & Popis stanovništva 2011

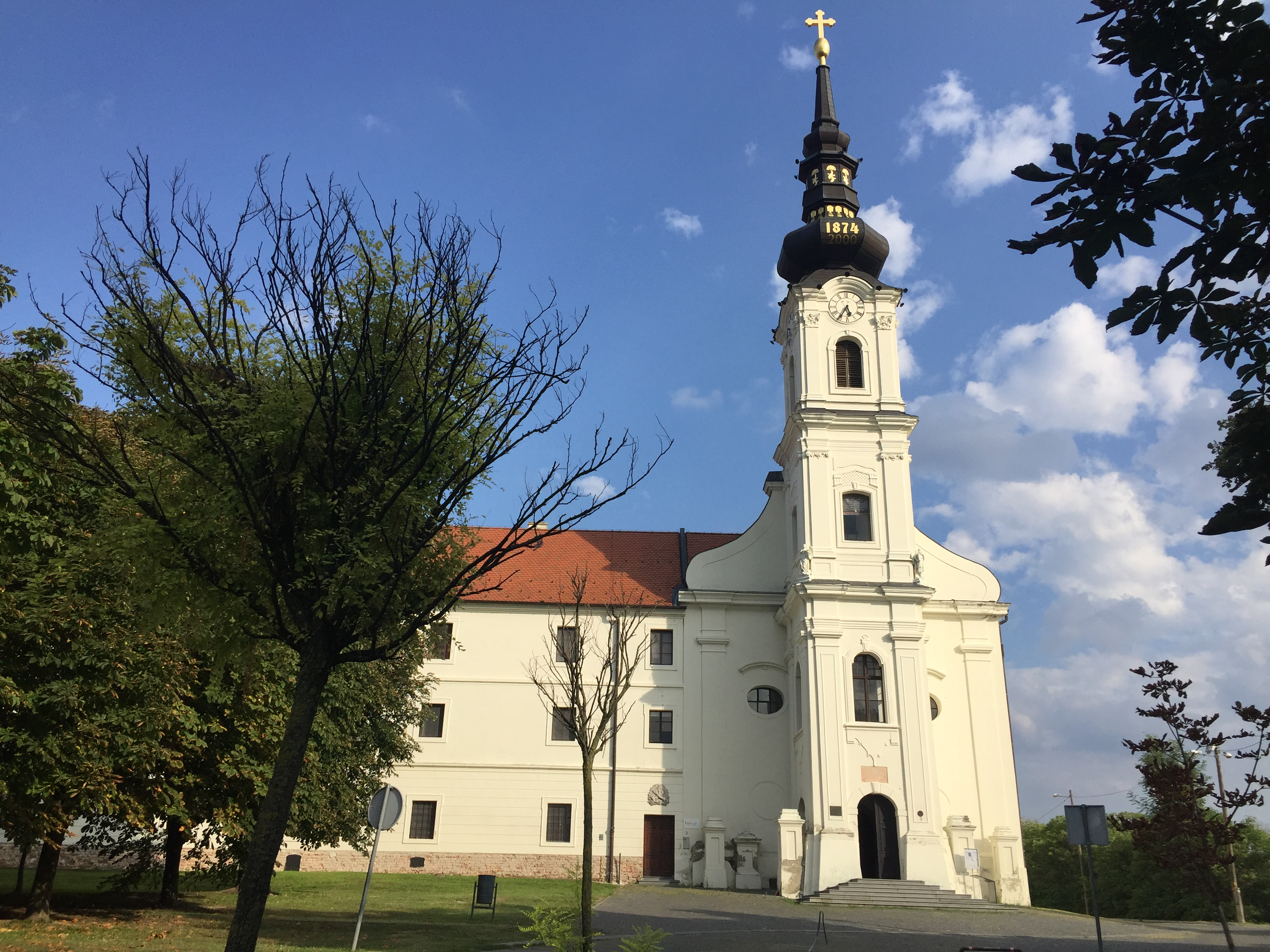
Franciscan monastery with Church of Saints Philip and James

In the years from 1948 until 1991 Vukovar's population increased quickly due to industrial development. Primarily it was immigration that fed the growth in the Vukovar region and in the town particularly. The region's population distribution changed notably too when the town of Ilok became the second largest town in the region.

City of Vukovar: Population trends 1857–2021
v

population	8162	9453	10234	11205	11557	12149	12116	12738	18994	20616	25763	38830	41959	46735	31670	27683	23175
	1857	1869	1880	1890	1900	1910	1921	1931	1948	1953	1961	1971	1981	1991	2001	2011	2021

Sources: Croatian Bureau of Statistics publications

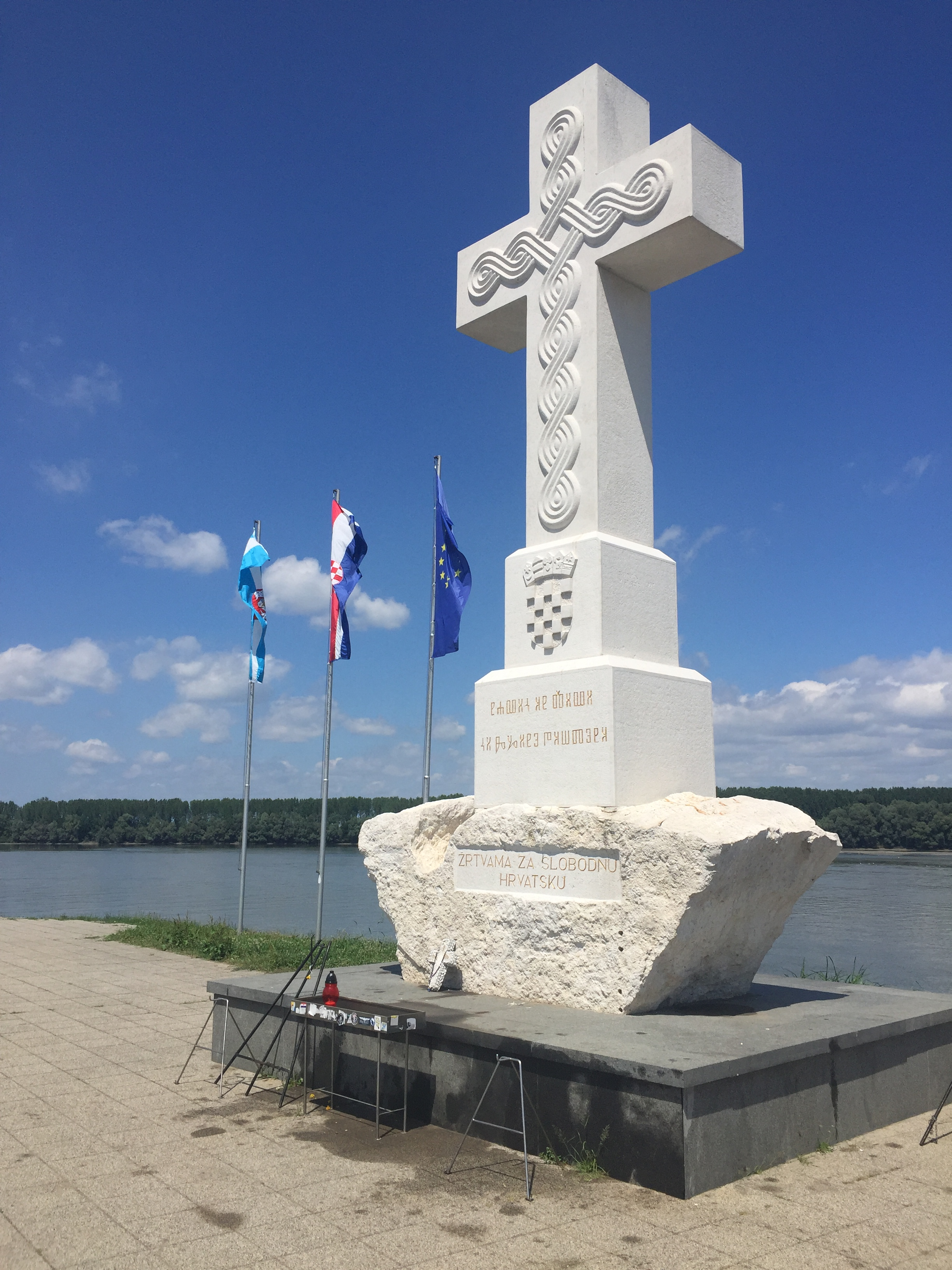
The Central Memorial Cross was erected in honour of all fallen defenders for Croatian freedom in October 1998 at the estuary of river Vuka. The work of Šime Vidulin. It is symbolically made of stone from Brač and Istria, with an inscription in glagolitic: "Navik on živi ki zgine pošteno" ("The one who dies honestly, lives forever "), verses sung by Fran Krsto Frankopan, and the words, "To all the victims for Free Croatia".

The most significant change was the forced displacement and internment of the German civilian population after World War II. The confiscated houses and properties were given to Croat and Serb colonists during the years of Socialist Yugoslavia.

National structure of the population of Vukovar:
Year	Total	Croats		Serbs		Germans		Hungarians		Others	
2021	23,536	14,605	63.02%	6,890	29.73%	45	0.19%	220	0.95%	1,776	7.55%
2011	27,683	15,881	57.37%	9,654	34.87%	58	0.21%	347	1.25%	1,743	6.30%
2001	31,670	18,199	57.5%	10,412	32.9%	58	0.2%	387	1.2%	2,614	8.3%
1990	44,639	21,065	47.2%	14,425	32.3%	94	0.2%	694	1.5%	8,361	18.8%
1971	30,222	14,694	48.6%	9,132	30.2%	60	0.2%	835	2.8%	5,501	18.2%
1948	17,223	10,943	63.5%	4,390	25.5%	54	0.3%	913	5.3%	923	5.3%
1931	10,242	5,048	49.6%	1,702	16.6%	2,670	26.1%	571	5.6%	215	2.0%
1910	10,359	4,092	39.5%	1,628	15.7%	3,503	33.8%	954	9.2%	183	1.8%

National structure of the population in the municipality of Vukovar:
Year of census	total	Croats	Serbs	Others
2001	31,670	18,199 (57.46%)	10,412 (32.88%)	3,059 (9.66%)
1991	84,024	36,910 (43.93%)	31,910 (37.98%)	15,204 (18.09%)
1981	81,203	30,157 (37.14%)	25,146 (30.97%)	25,903 (31.89%)
1971	76,602	34,629 (45.21%)	28,470 (37.17%)	13,593 (17.09%)
1961	54,707	24,527 (44.83%)	22,774 (41.63%)	7,406 (13.54%)

The Croats were in the majority in most villages and in the region's eastern part, whereas the Serbs dominated in the northwest. Vukovar's population was ethnically mixed and had 28 ethnic groups before the war. Since the boundaries of the municipality have changed a few times, there are significant differences in the population census between 1961 and 1971, and 1991 and 2001.

Particularly since the war in Croatia, much of the native Croat population has moved to other areas of Croatia or emigrated to Western Europe (notably Germany or Austria) and many Serbs have either moved to Serbia or to Canada and Western Europe.

Fifteen years after the war, in 2006, the city's ethnic makeup showed equal percentages of Croat and Serb residents. The city remains very divided, as a deeper sense of reconciliation has failed to take root. The ethnic communities remain separated by mistrust, divided institutions and disappointment. Separate schooling for Croat and Serb children remains in place. Incidents involving Croats and Serbs occur regularly, and public spaces have become identified not by the services they offer but by the ethnicity of those who gather there. Even coffee shops are identified as Croat or Serb.

In 2013, the government's intention to implement in Vukovar the Constitutional Law on the Rights of Ethnic Minorities in Croatia that allowed for minorities, where they made up more than a third of a city's population, to be entitled to have their language used for official purposes, provoked considerable popular opposition.

=== Minority languages ===
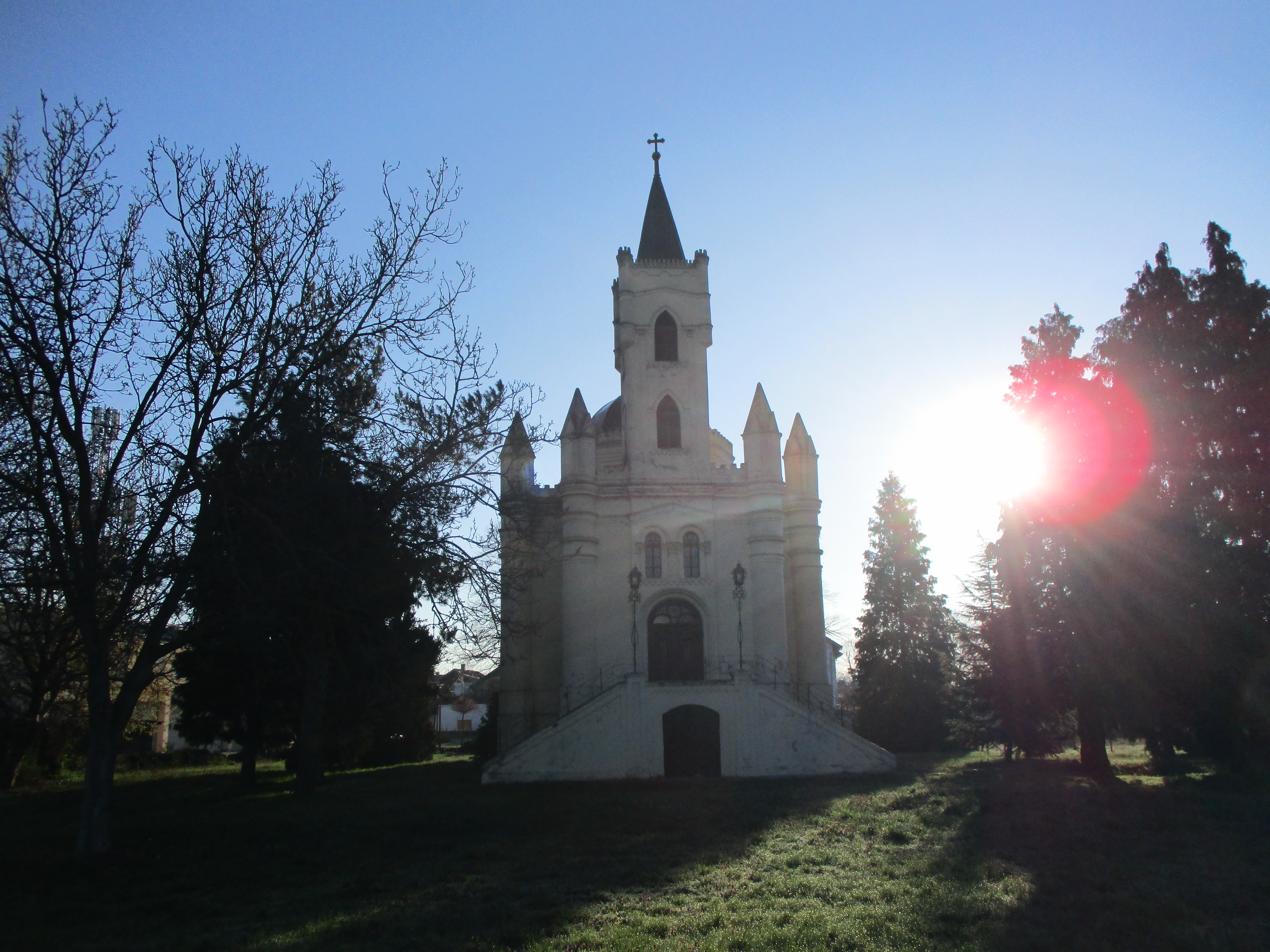
Neogothic Paunović Family Mausoleum

According to the 2011 Croatian census, the Serb population of the city has exceeded one third, which is the legal prerequisite for the Serbian Cyrillic alphabet to gain constitutionally protected co-official status. In 2013, this re-ignited political discussion on the matter, which had already arisen in 2009 after the local promulgation of Serbian Cyrillic as available for public use. According to the 2021 census, Serbs make up less than one third which removes constitutional guarantees on the official status of Serbian Cyrillic in the town. Croatian law, however, explicitly permits local authorities to introduce co-official languages even when there is less than one third of minority population (notably, but not exclusively, Istria County) with domestic and internal stakeholders calling upon the town of Vukovar to consider this option even before 2011 census. Following the publication of 2021 census results, mayor of Vukovar nevertheless announced intention to scrap the minority language protections with some commentators criticizing the abolition of already acquired rights including the President of the Constitutional Court of Croatia Miroslav Šeparović. In November 2023, the Government of the Republic of Croatia decided to declare an end to mandatory bilingualism in Vukovar on the basis of the 2021 census, which showed the Serbian population fraction had fallen below the required one third, at 29.73%. Preserving traditional Serbian place names and assigning street names to Serbian historical figures had been legally mandated and carried out.

== Cultural heritage ==
Among a number of notable buildings, severely damaged in the recent war, are the Eltz Manor of the Eltz noble family from the 18th century, Baroque buildings in the centre of the town, the Franciscan monastery with the parish church of Sts. Philip and James, the water tower, the birth house of Nobel prize winner Lavoslav Ružička, the Serbian Orthodox church of St Nicholas, the palace of Syrmia County etc. Since the peaceful reintegration under Croatian control in 1998, many buildings have been rebuilt, but there are many ruins still in the town.

Outside the town, on the banks of the Danube toward Ilok, lies a notable archaeological site, Vučedol. The ritual vessel called the Vučedol Dove (vučedolska golubica) is considered the symbol of Vukovar. Vučedol is also an excursion destination, frequented by anglers and bathers, especially the sandy beach on Orlov Otok (Eagle's Island).

Vukovar Synagogue was built in 1889, and was devastated by the Nazis in 1941. The ruins stood until they were demolished in 1958.

== Politics ==
=== Local Government ===
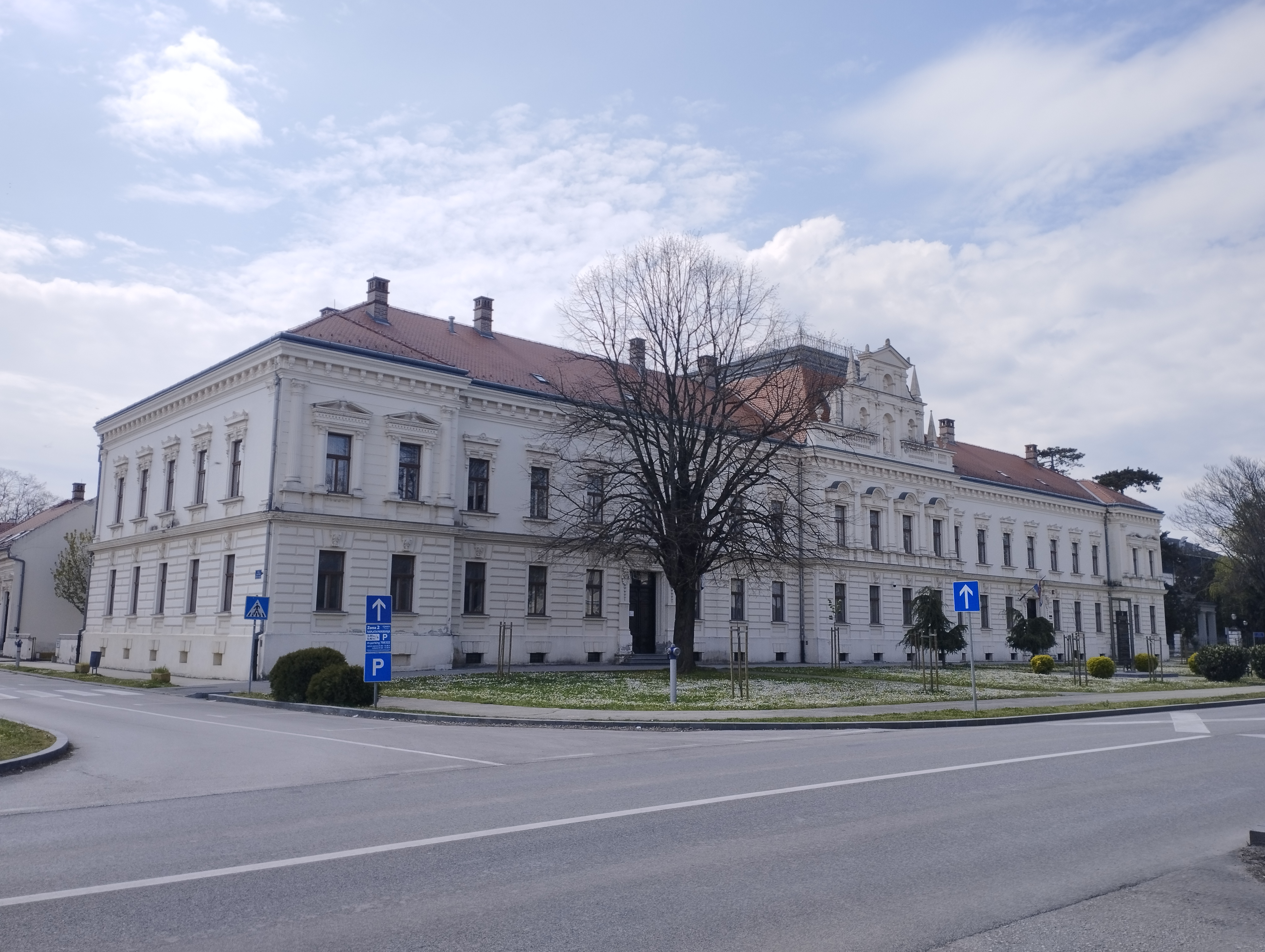
Palača pravde – Palace of justice, the County Court in Vukovar

Following the 2021 Croatian local elections the Assembly of the City of Vukovar is composed of 19 elected representatives. Out of a total of 23,138 eligible voters 11,160 or 48.23% participated in the elections and there were 10,808 or 96.85% valid ballots. Right wing Ivan Penava's Independent List got 4,516 or 41.78% ballots and 9 elected representatives, Croatian Democratic Union got 2,347 or 21.71% ballots and 5 elected representatives, Independent Democratic Serb Party got 1,222 ballots or 11.30% and 2 elected representatives, former Social-Democrat major Želko Sabo's Independent List got 712 or 6.58% ballots and 1 elected representative, Democratic Alliance of Serbs got 631 or 5.83% ballots and 1 elected representative, coalition of the Croatian People's Party – Liberal Democrats, Croatian Peasant Party, Croatian Social Liberal Party and Active Independent Pensioners got 599 or 5.54% ballots and 1 elected representative. Parties which failed to reach 5% of votes required for allocation of seats in the City Assembly were the Social Democratic Party of Croatia with 3.91%, Serb politician Dragan Crnogorac's Independent List with 1.72% and Pavao Josić's Independent List with 1.59%.

The mayor of Vukovar was elected in the second round of the elections after nobody among 5 candidates received over 50% of votes. In the second round right wing candidate Ivan Penava was elected with 5,392 votes, while losing candidate from the Croatian Democratic Union Nikola Mažar got 4,529 votes. Deputy Mayor from the Serbs of Vukovar community was elected in the first round with Independent Democratic Serb Party's candidate Srđan Kolar receiving 1,128 votes and the losing candidate from the Democratic Alliance of Serbs Srđan Milaković receiving 781 vote.

Summary of the 2021 Croatian local elections for the City Assembly
Party	Votes	%	Seats
Ivan Penava's Independent List	4,516	41.78	9
Croatian Democratic Union	2,347	21.71	5
Independent Democratic Serb Party	1,222	11.30	2
Željko Sabo's Independent List	712	6.58	1
Democratic Alliance of Serbs	631	5.83	1
Croatian People's Party – Liberal Democrats; Croatian Peasant Party; Croatian Social Liberal Party; Active Independent Pensioners	599	5.54	1
Social Democratic Party of Croatia	423	3.91	0
Independent politician Dragan Crnogorac's list	186	1.72	0
Pavao Josić's List	172	1.59	0
Invalid/blank votes	352	3.15	—
Total	11,160	100	—
Registered voters/turnout	23,138	48,23	—
Source(in Croatian)

== Institutions ==
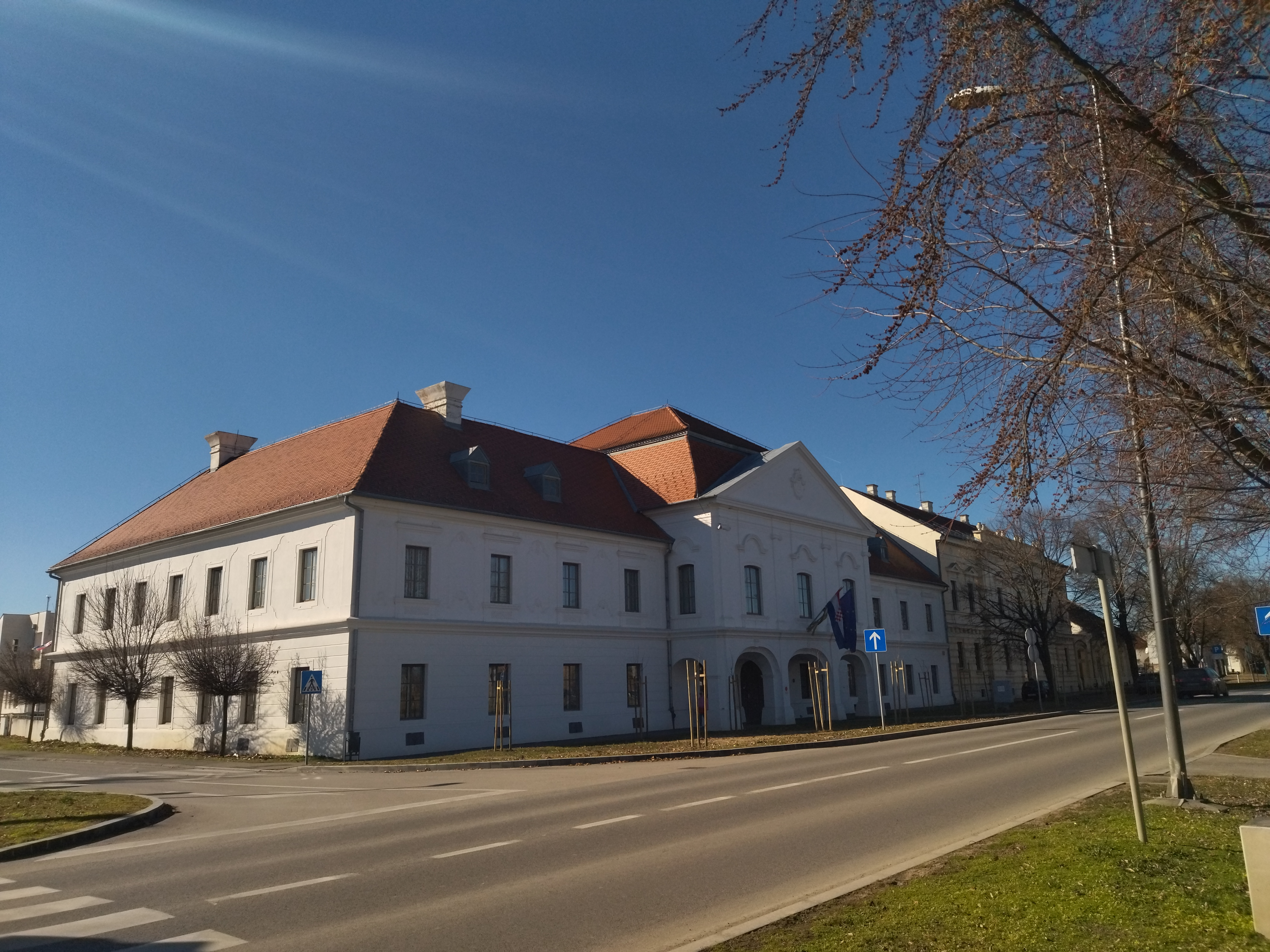
Palace of Syrmia County, seat of the Vukovar-Syrmia County

Vukovar is the seat of several local organisations and institutions such as Vukovar-Syrmia County, Polytechnic Lavoslav Ružička Vukovar, Gymnasium Vukovar, etc. It is also the seat of several organisations and institutions of the Serb minority in Croatia such as the Joint Council of Municipalities, the Association for Serbian language and literature in Croatia, the Independent Democratic Serb Party, the Party of Danube Serbs as well as the Consulate General of Serbia.

=== Minority councils and representatives ===
Directly elected minority councils and representatives are tasked with consulting tasks for the local or regional authorities in which they are advocating for minority rights and interests, integration into public life and participation in the management of local affairs. At the 2023 Croatian national minorities councils and representatives elections Hungarians, Pannonian Rusyns and Serbs of Vukovar fulfilled legal requirements to elect 15 members minority councils of the City of Vukovar while Ukrainians of Croatia elected their individual representative.

== Museums ==
=== Vukovar Municipal Museum ===
Vukovar Municipal Museum was founded in 1948 by a donation of Roman money, furniture, weapons, and paintings given to his city by Dr. Antun Bauer. The museum started in the Coach Post Building in the old baroque centre, but was moved to Castle Eltz in 1966. Up until 1991 the museum had about 50 thousand exhibits in four separate divisions:

The Heritage Museum displayed the history of Vukovar from prehistory to modern times and some of its most important collections included the items excavated at the archaeological site Vučedol and the Culture and History Collection, which contained documents, furniture, and pieces of art, and provided an authentic display of the life of the citizens of Vukovar and the Eltz family.

For its work on the cultural restoration of Vukovar, revitalizing the devastated city and involving the local community in its work, the Vukovar Municipal Museum received the prestigious European Silletto award – EMYA 2016, awarded by the European Museum Forum in San Sebastian, Spain.

Bauer Collection and Art Gallery contained the most complete overview of modern Croatian art from the end of the 19th and the early 20th century with special emphasis on the period between the two world wars. Among more than one thousand pieces of art the Collection contained the works of Vlaho Bukovac, Mato Celestin Medović, Ico Kršnjavi, Ivan Meštrović, Fran Kršinić, Emanuel Vidović, and many others.

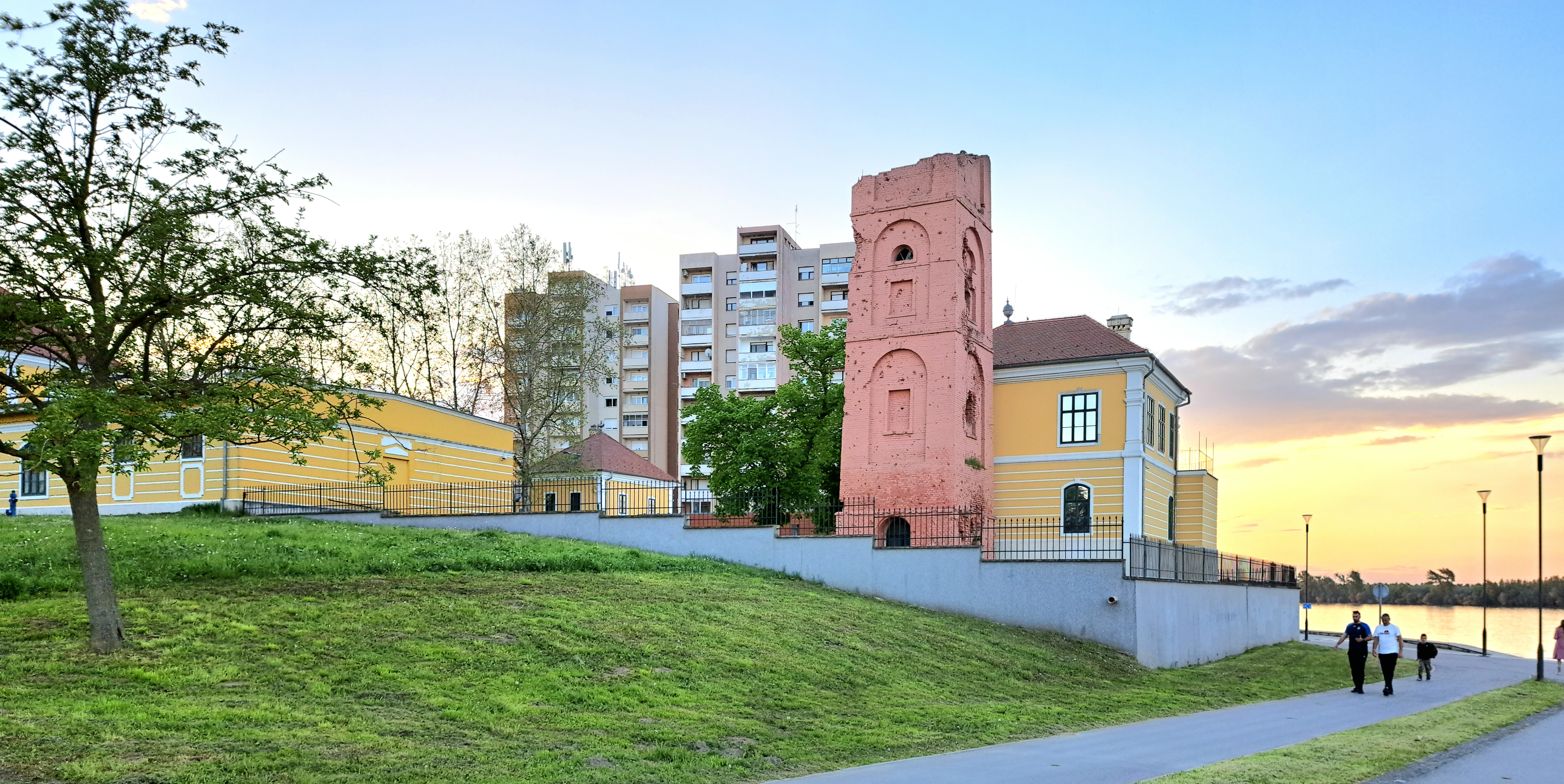
Bauer Gallery on the banks of the Danube with the Old Red Water Tower, the oldest of the 3 Vukovar Water Towers

Memorial Museum of the Nobel Prize Winner Lavoslav Ružička, located in the house where he was born, it displayed original documents and medals from the life and work of the Nobel Prize winner, who received this prestigious award in 1939 for chemistry.

Memorial Museum of the 2nd Congress of the Communist Party of Yugoslavia was located in the Workers' Hall building, former Grand Hotel, where the congress was held in 1920. The materials connected to the development of the labour movement and the founding of the Communist Party of Yugoslavia was exhibited and presented here.

During Croatian War of Independence, Castle Eltz suffered significant damage and the collections which were kept there were also damaged: some of the exhibits were completely destroyed, some have disappeared and cannot be recovered, and some of them were taken to Serbia. After years of effort and diplomatic activity by the Ministry of Culture of the Republic of Croatia that part of the collection was returned to Vukovar on 13 December 2001. In the period from 1991 to 1997 the Vukovar City Museum was operating in the Mimara Museum in Zagreb.

Near the end of 1992 a collection was founded with the name Vukovar Museum in Exile which began the creation of a collection of donations by Croatian, and soon after also European, artists for the City of Vukovar. To this day that collection has gathered over 1400 pieces of modern Croatian and European art. This collection represented the beginning of the cultural restoration of Vukovar and it is displayed at the restored Castle Eltz today, along with other museum collections which are part of the permanent collection of the museum.

The Castle Eltz complex has since been renovated. It now serves as a museum, gallery, and science and multimedia centre presenting the area's cultural heritage.

In 2013 the Vukovar City Museum won the Anton Štifanić Award for its contribution to tourism in Croatia, and in 2014 it won the Simply the Best award.

=== Vučedol Culture Museum ===
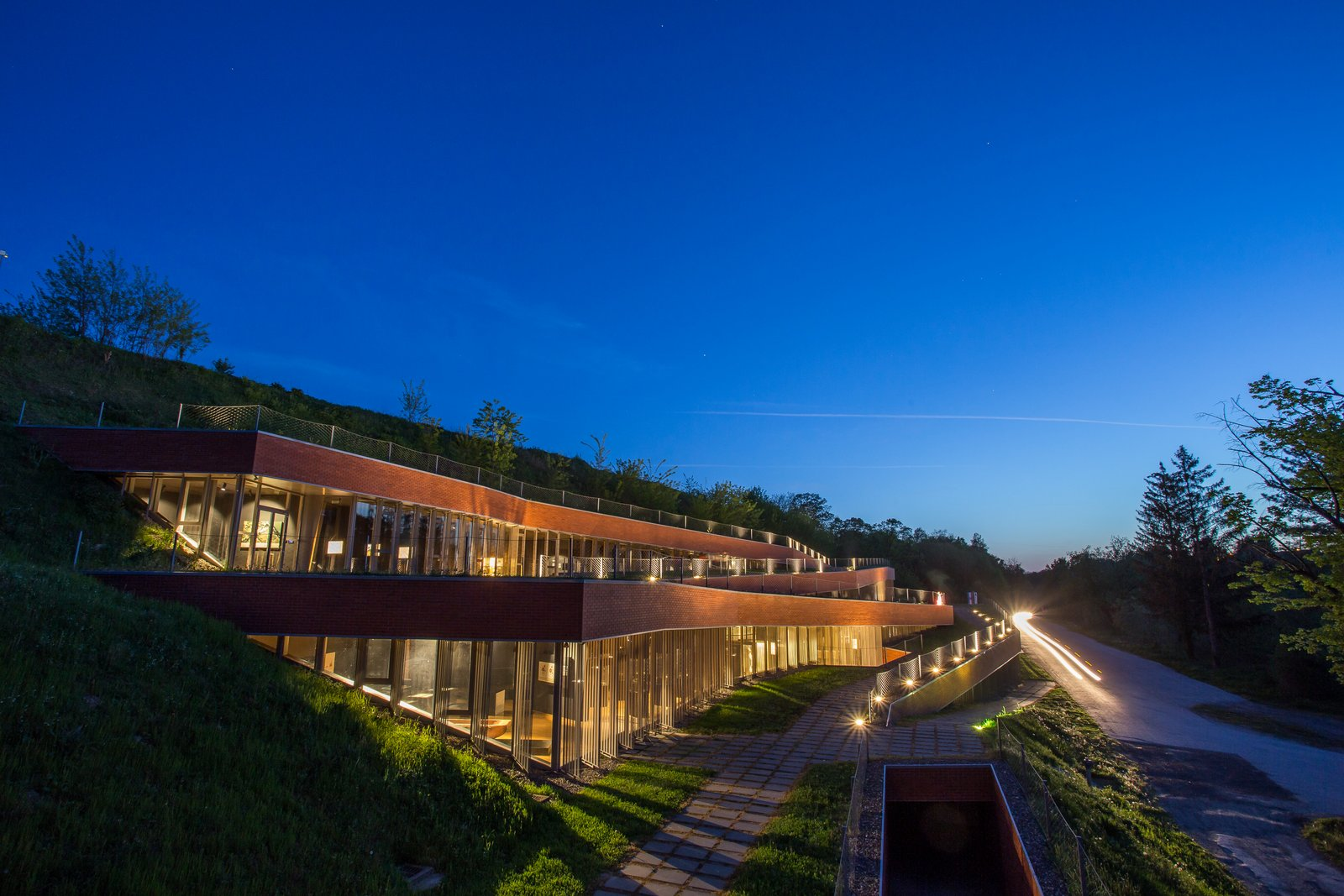
The Vučedol Culture Museum and Archaeological Site bears testimony to one of the earliest Indo-European cultures. In 2022 museum was the winner of the prestigious European "Destination of Sustainable Cultural Tourism" award.

is open on the tenth of June 2015. Is one of the most modern museums in Croatia.

The museum is positioned on one side almost at the very Danube riverbank and on the other side, on four floors, in the hill, while its flat green roof is a promenade which leads to the archaeological site. As for the content, the permanent exhibition is displayed in 19 rooms on almost 1200 square metres. In addition to using state of the art technologies, multimedia and interactive content, the way of life on Vučedol culture localities, spreading through 12 European countries, is displayed.

== Events ==
In Vukovar during the year there are many cultural events. Certainly the most important is the Danube region Vukovar Film Festival.

- The Vukovar Film Festival is unique due to many things. It is the only film festival of the community of Danube region countries and the only one held literally on the Danube. It is designed to promote and spread the creative development of filmmakers from the region and it is organised with the intent to contribute to cultural restoration in the city destroyed in the Homeland War. The theme of the festival, the films from the Danube region countries, is logically connected to Vukovar as a centre of the Croatian part of the community of the Danube region. Cultural influences have always spread along the Danube. Since the Vukovar film festival is the only film festival focused on this region, on the international level it seeks to connect filmmakers from the Danube region countries, whose film making industries are some of the most vital in the world.
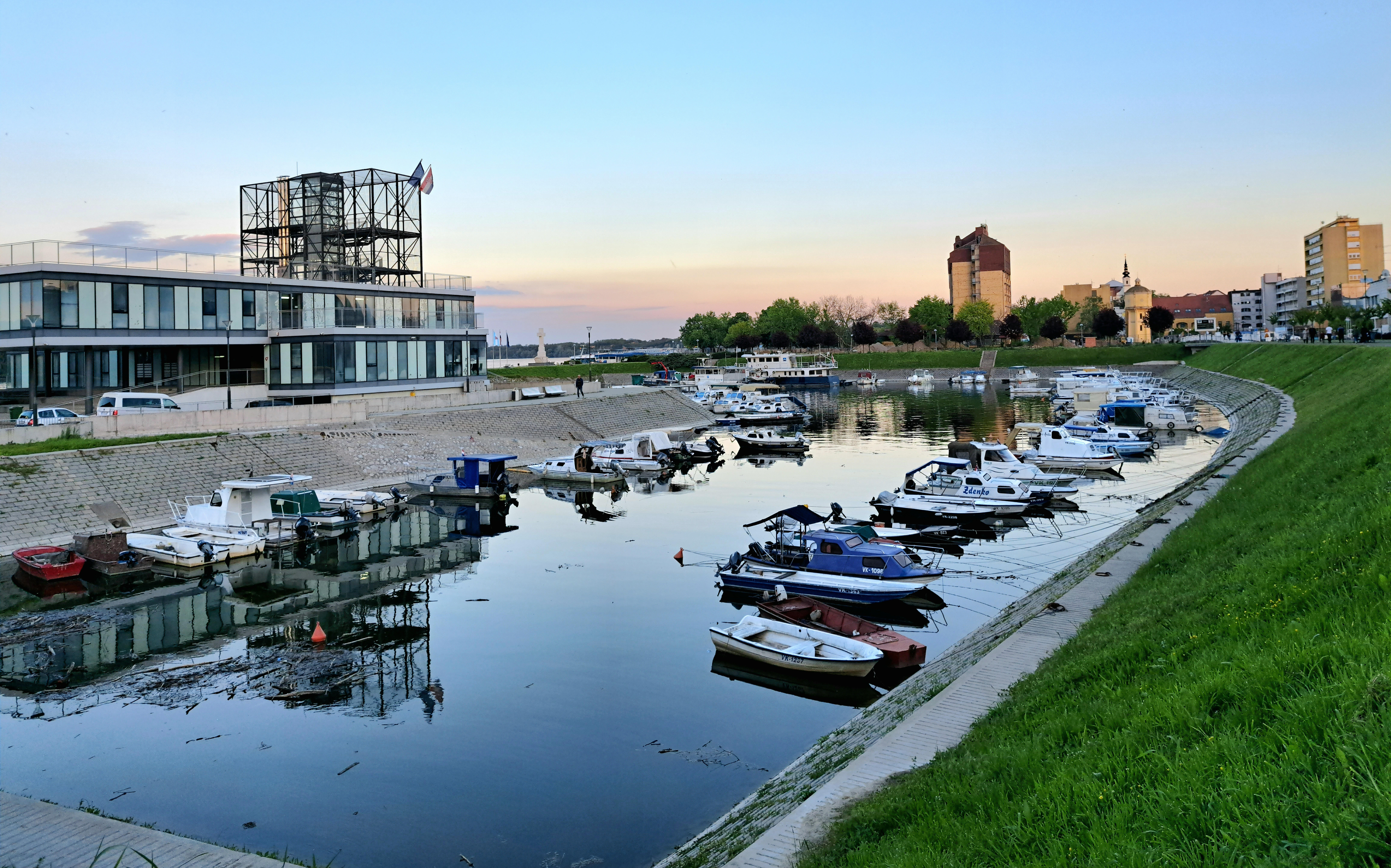
  Winter port, Vukovar
- The Vukovar Chamber music Festival is held in the first half of June at the area of Castle Eltz, the Chapel of Saint Rok, and the Church of Saint Filip and Jakov in Vukovar, and it traditionally starts with a concert by the Zagreb Philharmonic Orchestra. The guests of the festival are solo performers and chamber ensembles from Croatia and Europe.
- The Vukovar Puppet Spring Festival was founded in 1996 as a national theatre conference. There are around 15 puppet theatres performing every year and in the five days of the festival they give around 100 performances in the towns and municipalities of Vukovarsko-Srijemska County. The centre of the festival is the town of Vukovar where 16 performances are played and where various workshops and an awards ceremony are held (for the award for life achievement in contribution to Croatian puppetry). The festival is held at the same time every year, the week before the Holy Week before Easter. In 2011 there were 16 puppet theatres from Croatia and abroad (Pecs, Mostar) that participated the festival.

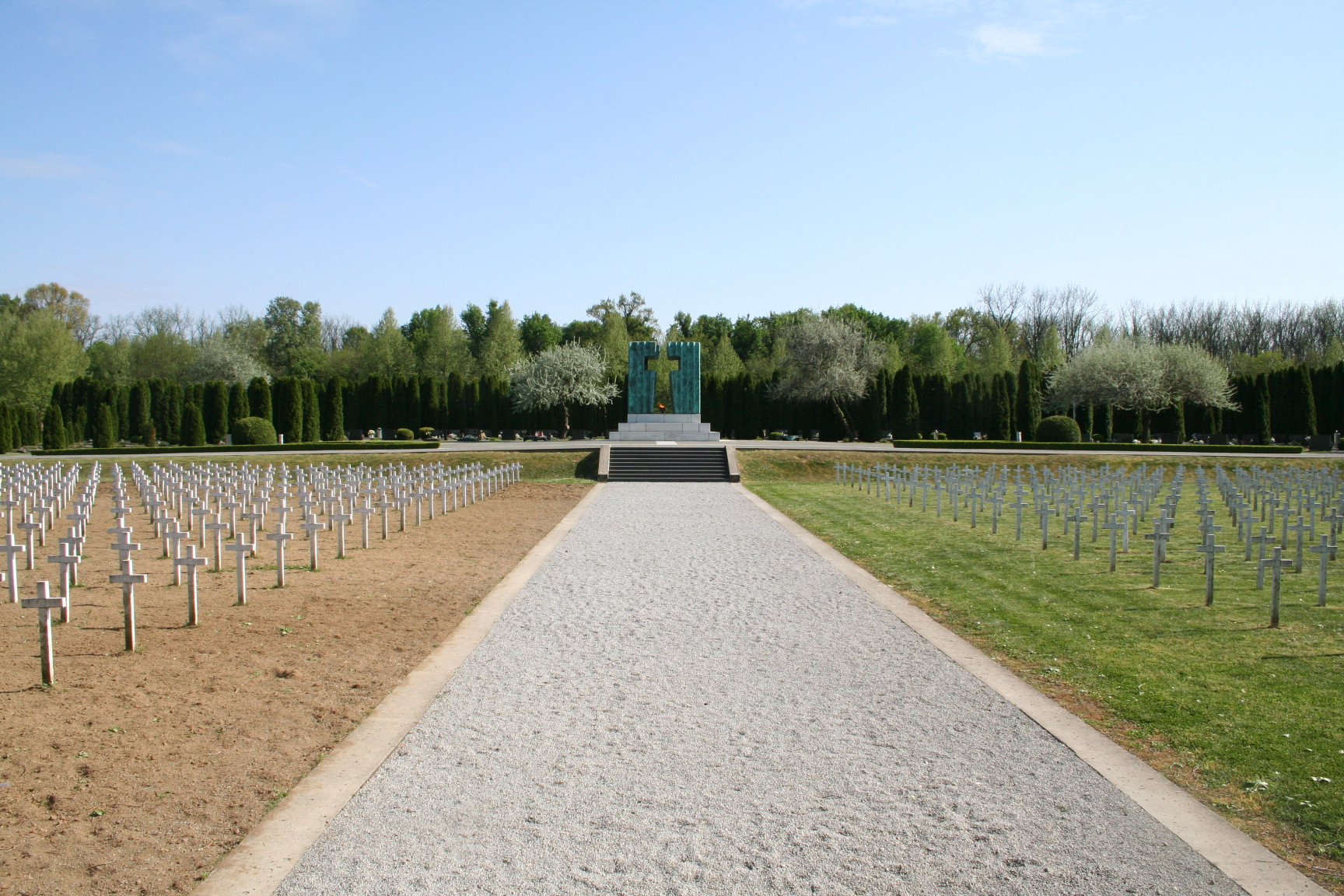
National Memorial Cemetery of The Victims of Homeland War in Vukovar during the National Remembrance Day, public holiday on November 18, for all the victims of the war in Croatia and the Vukovar massacre, one of the symbolic and crucial events in the Croatian War of Independence 1991.

*Saint Vinko's Day in Vučedol is an event held traditionally every year on 22 January at the Goldschmidt farm grounds. This event marks the beginning of the year's work in the vineyards and it starts with a blessing of the vineyards. Sausages and other cured meat products are hung on the vines, because of a tradition that by hanging large sausages on the vines, the grape vines will be more fruitful and the grape clusters will be large. The same legend claims that if on that day, before noon, icicles or snow melts and creates puddles in which a sparrow can bathe, the year will be fruitful and there will be so much wine that people can bathe in it. Along with an accompanying culture and art programme, this event represents a true vineyard experience, with mulled wine and delicacies that the visitors may taste or prepare for themselves, on the fire.

- Bonofest is held every year in the middle of May. It is a festival of spiritual music held in the church of Saint Filip and Jakov. The two evenings of the festival feature musicians who were selected by a committee of professionals.
- The Ethno fair is organised each year by the Vukovar City Tourist Board and takes place in September in the city centre in the "Hotel Grand" building. Various craftsmen, winemakers and other manufacturers sell their handmade products which represent the heritage of this part of Croatia.
- The Vukovar Advent Festivities start four weeks during Advent during which a series of musical and performance events are organised. Each event is special as the traditional lighting of the candles is performed.
- Silent night in Vukovar is a traditional Christmas concert of Croatian National Television. It is held during Vukovar's Advent Festivities in the Church of St. Philip and James
- The Christmas Fair is held a couple of days before Christmas.
- ‘SVI zaJEDNO HRVATSKO NAJ’, festival of non-material Croatian cultural heritage, held as part of the Vukovar City Day celebration at the beginning of May.

== Economy ==
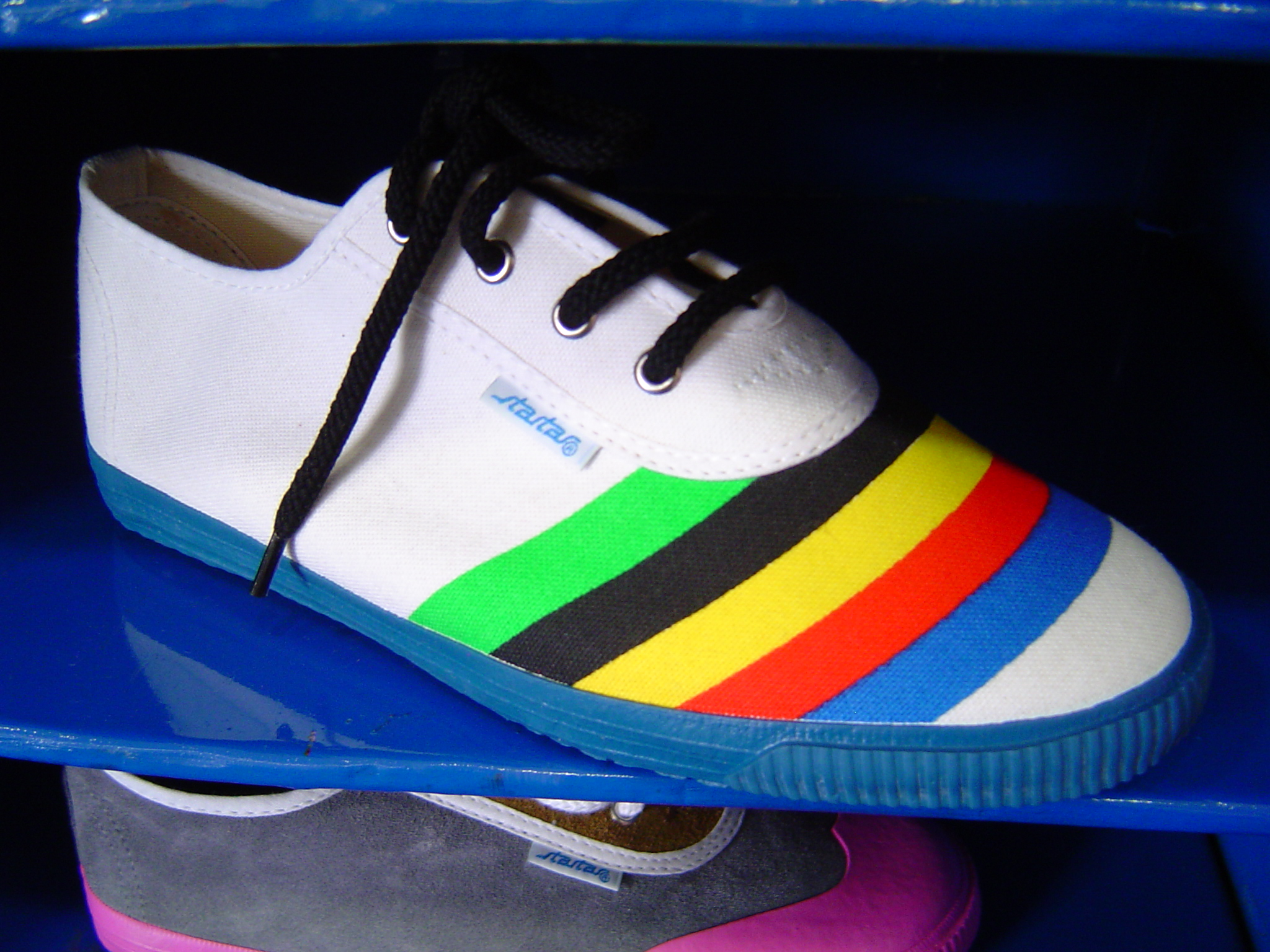
Startas sport shoes, the flagship brand of the Borovo shoe manufacturer. former member of the famous Group Bata, the world first shoe producer. Brand Startas was born in 1976 thanks to the new techniques of rubber vulcanization invented in the 70s. Historically designed for Table tennis players.

The Port of Vukovar is situated on 1,335 kilometres (830 miles) of the downstream flow of Danube river, on its right coast, and is the biggest official concessioner in the Vukovar region. The Company focuses its business on the transshipment of general and bulk cargo. The Port (850m long and 45m wide) is conveniently situated on the main current of the river, enabling navigation throughout the whole year regardless of water level. The Port recorded productivity growth and increase in cargo transshipment from 123,570 tons in 2009 to 295,199 tons in 2011. The majority of transshipment was in the category of bulk cargo (237,119 tons in 2011), while packaged goods and heavy cargo accounted for a total of 58,080 tons.

The economy of Vukovar is based on agriculture, trade, viticulture, food industry, textile industry, building materials industry, footwear industry and tourism. Vukovar is the largest Croatian town and river port on the Danube. Its economy is based on trade, farming, viticulture, livestock breeding, textiles, the food-processing industry, the footwear industry and tourism.

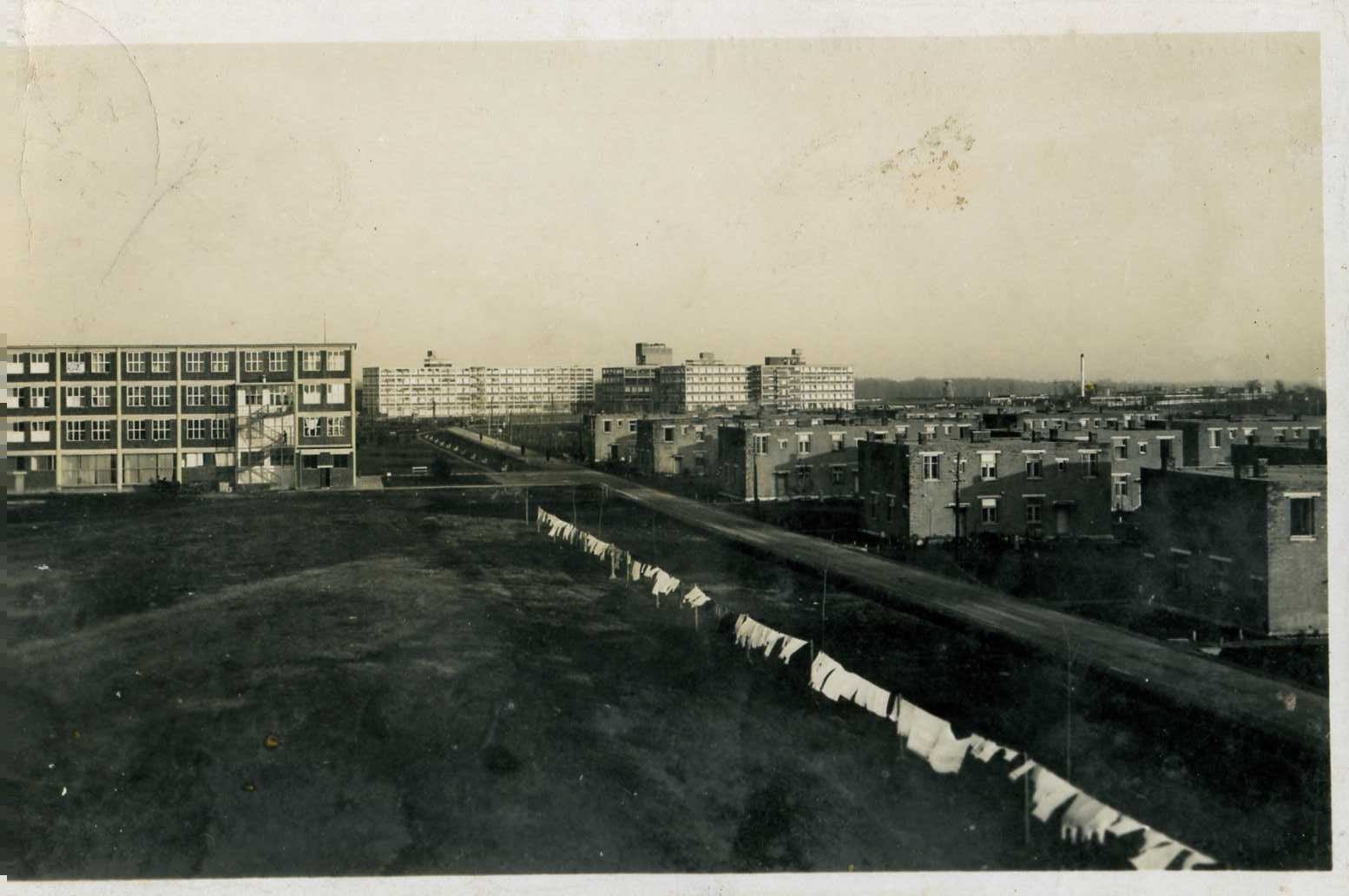
Standard Bata factories and housing at "Bata-ville", Vukovar borough 1941. Today's Borovo Naselje, local board, urban settlement 4 km (2.5 mi) from the Vukovar town center.

However, the port infrastructure in Vukovar, only partly reconstructed, still does not meet the requirements of the market. The layout of the port area, particularly the access to railway tracks and the quay operational area, are technologically inappropriate and not compatible with market standards. There is also a lack of warehouse capacity. Altogether, it affects the quality of the service provided in the Port and thus decreases the port competitiveness.

Borovo, a manufacturer of footwear located in Vukovar, ended up devastated and demolished in 1991 during the war. In its prime it employed 24,000 employees and tried to break into foreign markets with innovations in the manufacture of footwear, but today there are fewer than 1000 employees.

On 7 June 1931, Borovo was founded by Czech industrialist Tomáš Baťa. Borovo Factory was one of the few Bata Shoes factories in the world. In 1933, the production of rubber and technical goods started, and Bata in the gum industry became one of the first companies in the then Kingdom of Yugoslavia.

Between 1947 and the end of the 1980s, Borovo grew into the largest and most economically most powerful company in the production and sale of footwear and rubber in this part of Europe. Borovo Factory produced more than 20 million pair of shoes a year, thousands of tons of auto-rubber and rubber-technical goods, 22,000 people were employed at today's factories with more than 600 stores across the country. This time was marked by the significant export to European and other countries.

The Business Innovation Centre BIC-Vukovar is a rounded concept for the support of innovative, technologically oriented entrepreneurship independent of the size or maturity of the company. The goal of this centre is to attract or provide incentives for the creation and growth of technologically oriented companies in all phases of their life-cycle and provide them with a complete package of services to support their businesses, from workspaces, support for innovations, growth and export, as well as various intellectual and administrative services.

Since the end of the war, much of the infrastructure in Vukovar has remained unrestored and unemployment is estimated to stand at 40 percent. Vukovar is underdeveloped municipality which is statistically classified as the First Category Area of Special State Concern by the Government of Croatia.

== Transport ==
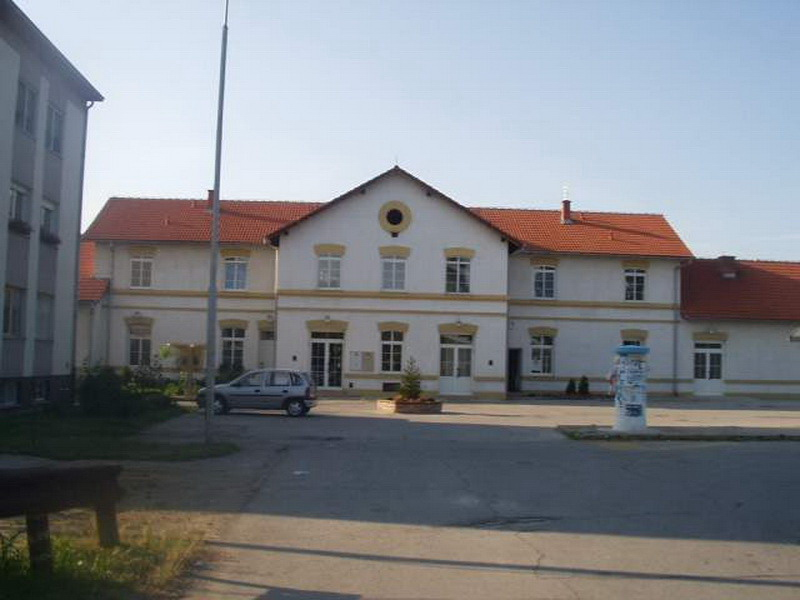
Main Vukovar-Borovo Naselje railway station

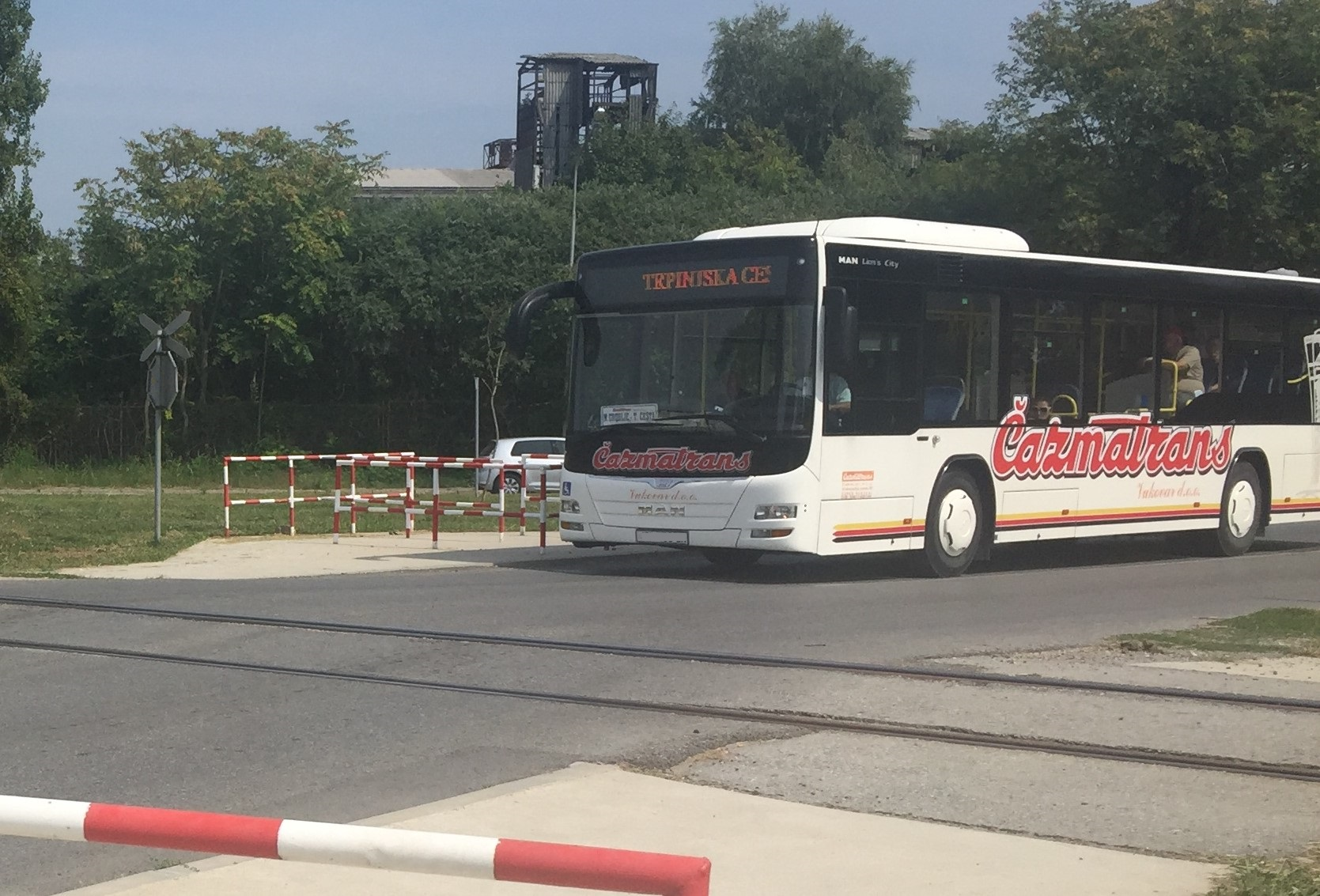
Čazmatrans Vukovar "MAN Lion's City" Bus

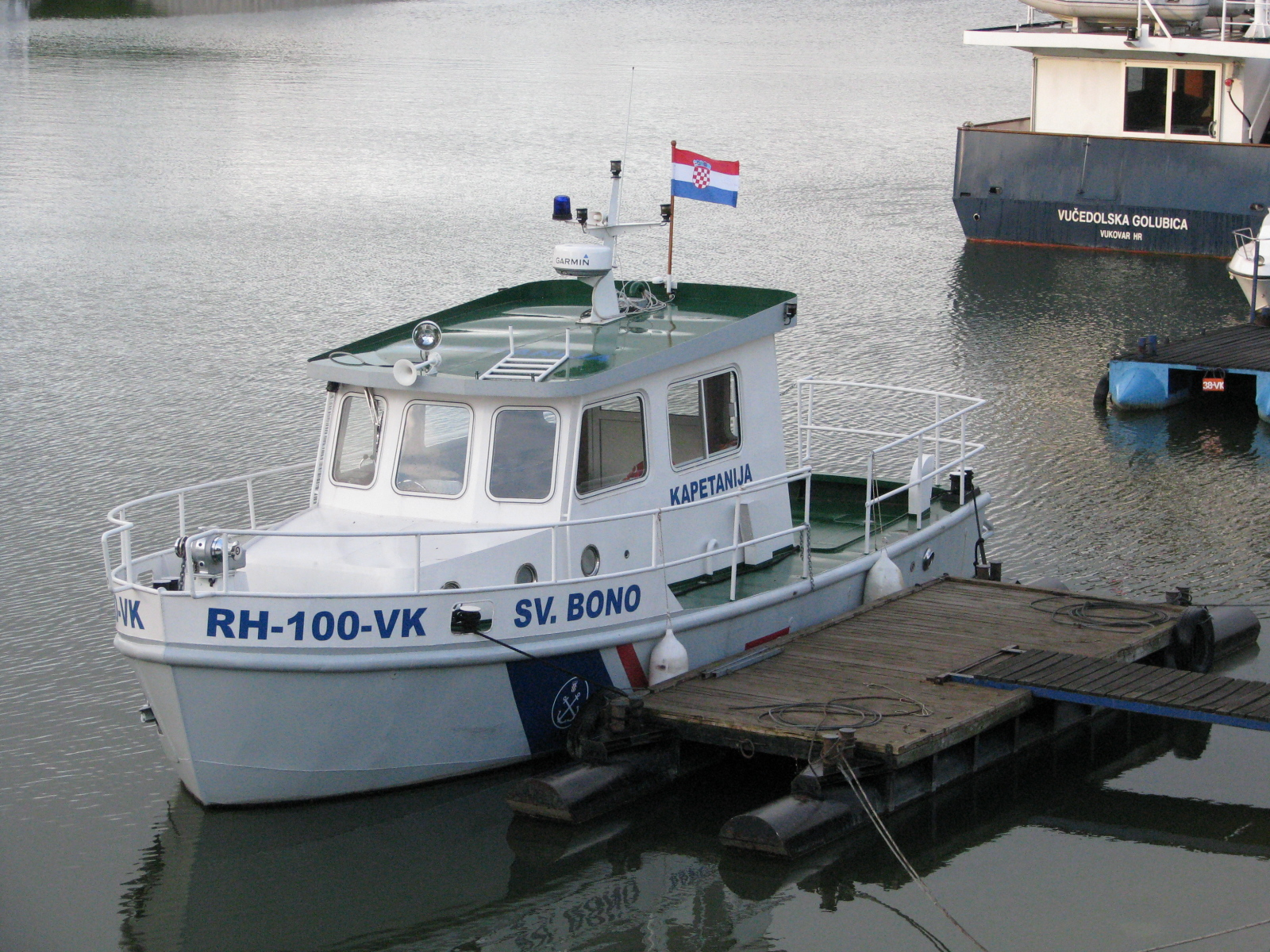
Danube patrol boat ″St. Bono″

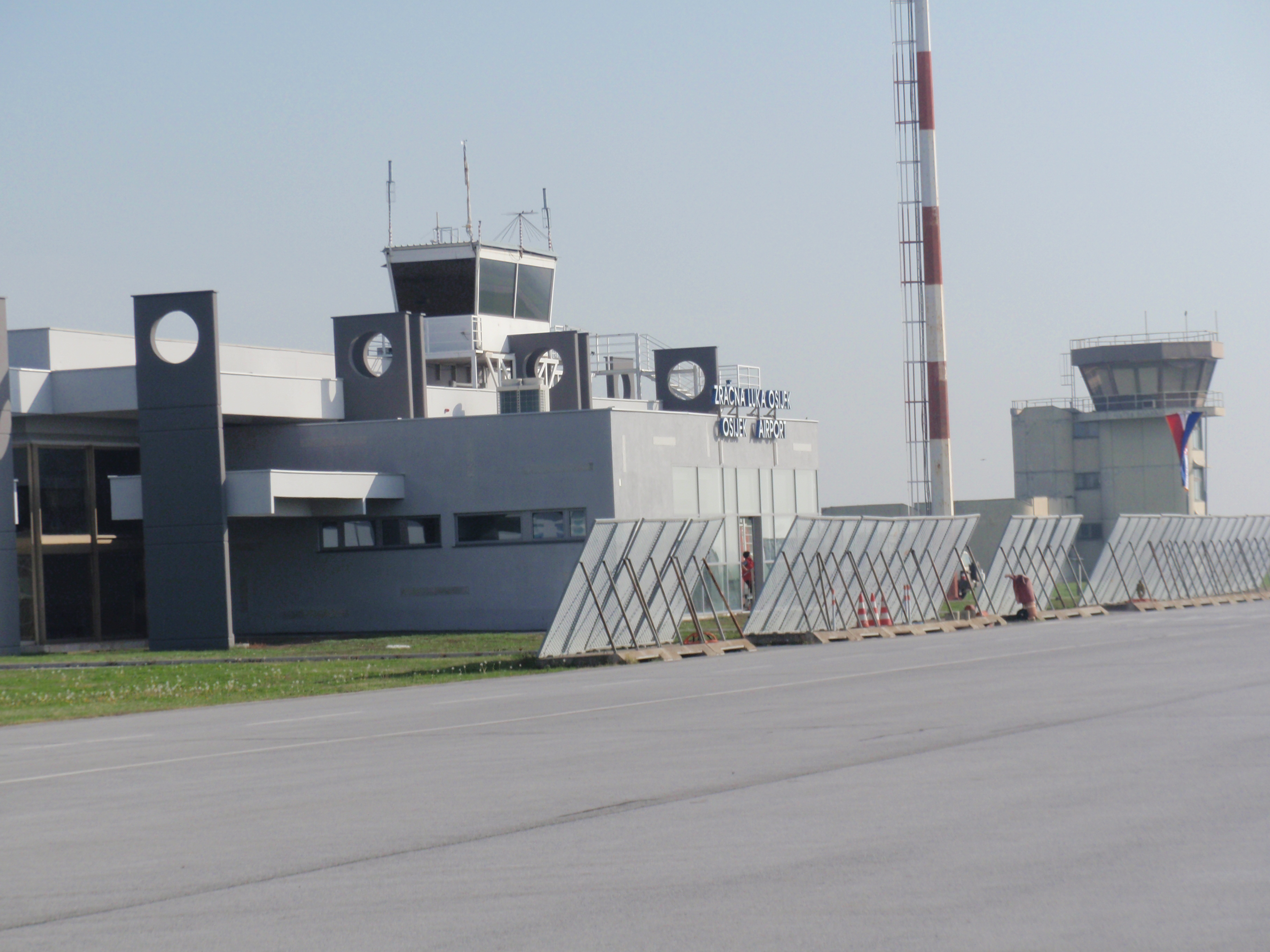
Osijek Airport (OSI), often referred to as "Klisa Airport", is the closest airport to Vukovar, located approximately 20 km away, making it the primary domestic air travel option for the Eastern Slavonia region.

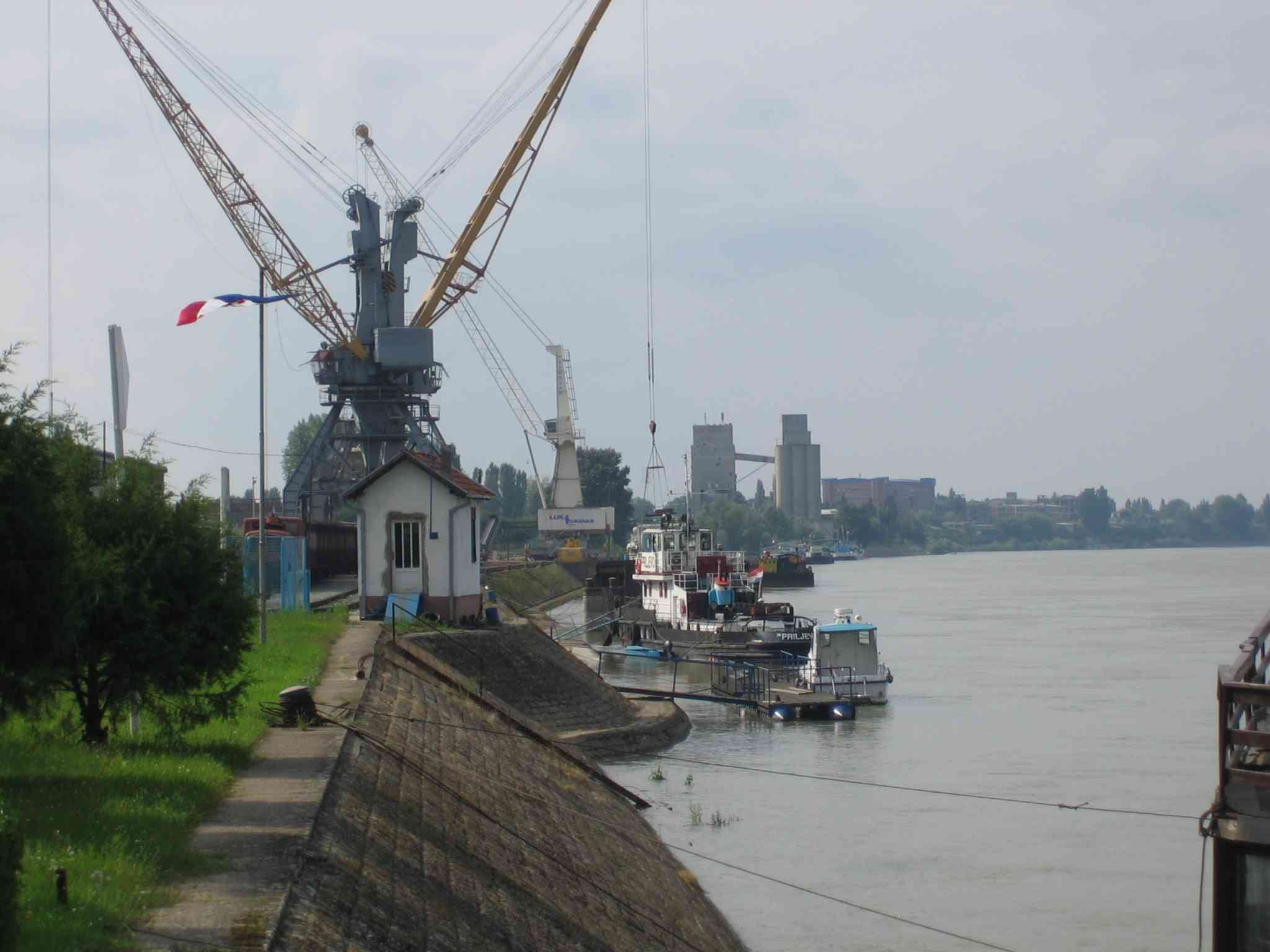
The Port of Vukovar on the Danube is Croatia's biggest river port

Vukovar is located in the northeastern part of the Republic of Croatia (45 ° 20 'north latitude and 16 ° 40' east longitude) and is the seat of the Vukovar-Srijem County. It lies at the mouth of the River Vuka in the Danube River (Luka Vukovar – Rkm 1335) and has a border position on the Danube River towards Serbia in Vojvodina. Due to the particularity of its geographical position, primarily marked by the international waterway – Danube River, Vukovar represents a significant traffic hub of the main roads.

There is a good traffic connection with the neighbouring countries of Bosnia and Herzegovina, Hungary and Serbia. Vukovar is 16 km away from the town of Vinkovci, the largest railway hub in Croatia. It is well connected by state road D55 via Vinkovci, 39 km away from the node of Županja on the A3 Zagreb-Lipovac motorway. The 33 km distant Osijek is connected by the state road D2, via which Vukovar is connected to Corridor Vc (motorway A6).

With Osijek Airport, 20 km north–west of Vukovar this area is also included in air traffic.

The city's position is very good for access to other markets within Central and South-Eastern Europe because it is located on or near the following trans-European corridors:

- Pan-European Transport Corridor VII – River Danube (Luka Vukovar)
- Osijek Airport -> 16 km away
- Pan-European Transport Corridor X – railway -> 14 km from Vinkovci hub (largest regional railway hub)
- Highway A3 -> 42 km away
- The European route E73 – the A5 and the A5 motorway -> 31 km away

=== Railways ===
The main railway station is located in Borovo Naselje. The Vukovar railway station, closer to the city center and the river port area, connects the Port of Vukovar on the Danube, via a modernized electrified railway via the Vinkovci railway junction, with the Croatian railway network. The route from Vukovar, via the Borovo Naselje district, connects via Erdut with the international railway network connecting Croatia and Serbia; this part of the railway is important for cargo traffic and is not electrified.

== Education and media ==
=== History and today ===
In accordance with its position in the economic and administrative terms of Vukovar developed in educational, cultural and health centre. For the 1730th Vukovar has developed popular education. From the Franciscan School has developed elementary school in Old Vukovar. New Vukovar has its own school.

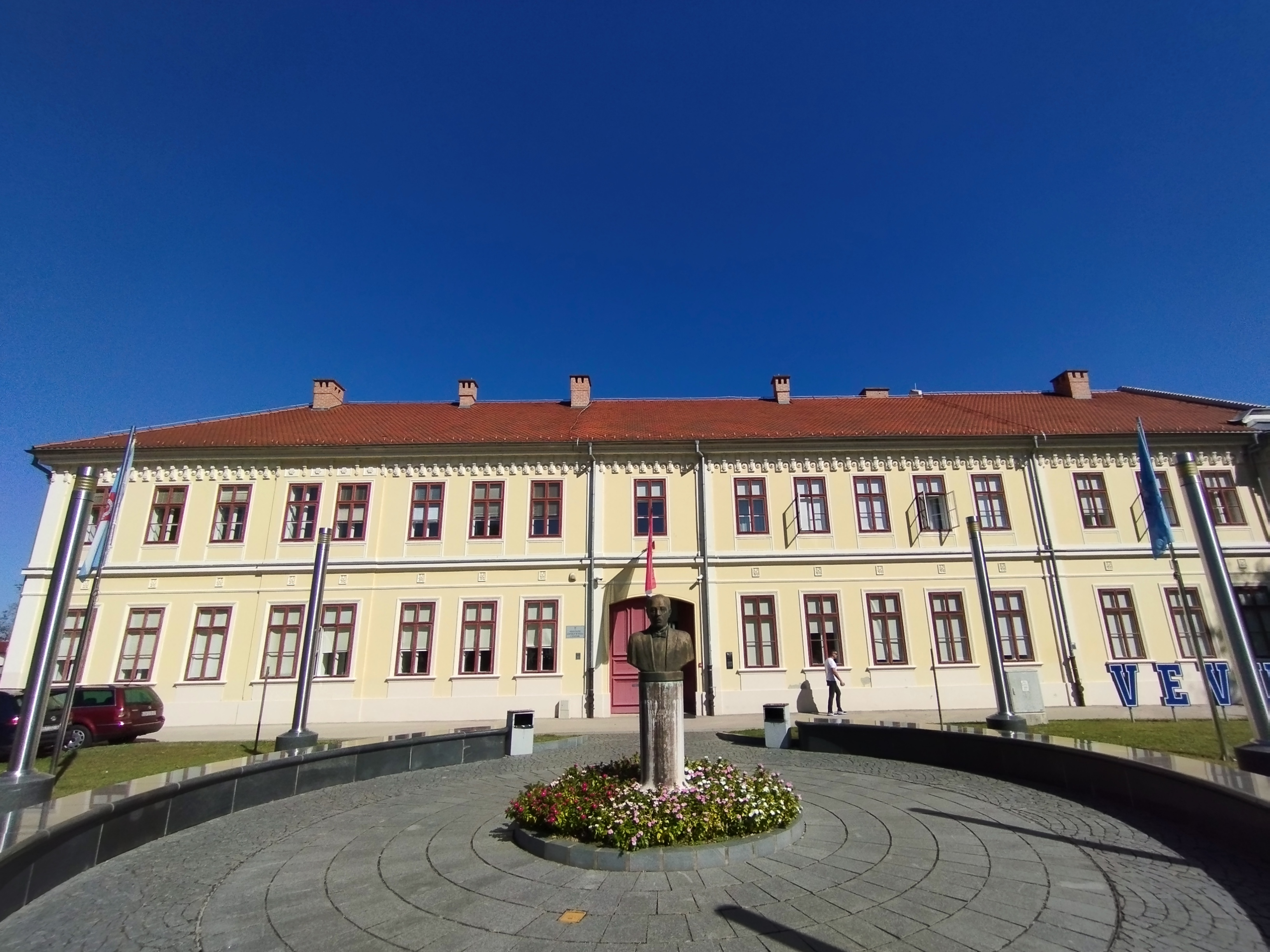
Palace Jirkovsky, Vukovar School of Economics

They worked and denominational schools for children and Orthodox Jewish religion, and schools in the German, Serbian Orthodox and Hungarian. Apprentice school was established in 1886. year, a gymnasium 1891st.

The first doctor with a diploma has been working in Vukovar since 1763, and the pharmacy was opened in 1791. The first small hospital was opened only in 1857.

Printing was opened in 1867 when they first came out and Vukovar in German newspaper Der Syrmier-Bote.

Vukovar has seven primary schools and five high schools, including one gymnasium (Gymnasium Vukovar) and one music school. The city is also home to the Lavoslav Ružička polytechnic, which offers study opportunities in the fields of economics and trade, law and kinesitherapy. Additionally, the University of Split runs dislocated studies in information technology, economics and law in Vukovar. Similarly, the University of Osijek offers programmes in economics and law.

In the period up to the First World War, about 30 societies were active in Vukovar. Singing, reading, sports and support societies had their own reading rooms, organized concerts and parties. Societies were often organized on a national basis. The first performance in the Croatian language was held in 1821, it was a dramatic work by the guardian of the Franciscan monastery Grga Cevapovic. The most influential Croatian society is the "Dunav" singing society. In 1922, the Croatian Home was opened in Vukovar, a place for all cultural events.

== Sport ==
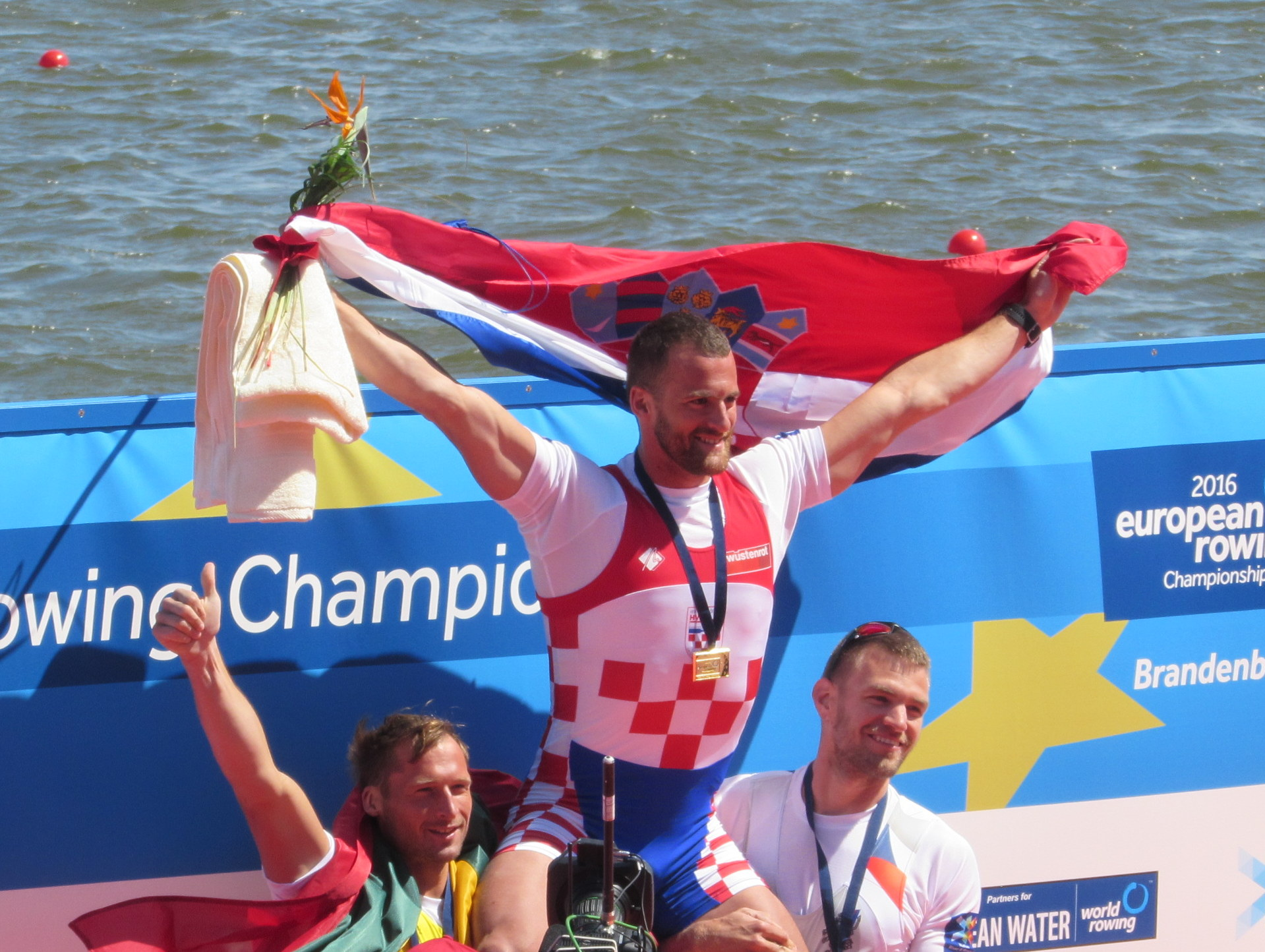
Rower Damir Martin, a three-time Olympic medalist and two-time world champion, was born in Vukovar.

Major sports facilities in the city of Vukovar are: Borovo Sports Hall (capacity 3,000 spectators) opened for maintenance International Table Tennis Championship of Yugoslavia (Borovo 1978), stadium FC Vukovar '91, sport and recreation center "Lijeva Bara" with a hall for martial arts, Borovo naselje Tennis Centre, Sports Centre "Hrgović", with tennis courts and horse riding, firing range, "Hill-7" as well as several football stadiums including Vukovar City Stadium and the FC Vuteks Sloga Stadium.

Currently the most modern swimming pool complex in Croatia is open in March 2017 in Vukovar. Pool complex is located about 5 km from city centre of Vukovar. Available is indoor swimming pool 50 x 25 metres. Also there are two smaller outdoor pools 22x12 metres and 25x12 metres. Inside swimming complex is also fitness room, sauna, dressing rooms, restaurant. Inside same sport complex is also sport hall available for all indoor sports, boxing, gym, fitness, bowling.

== Use in popular culture ==
- The siege of Vukovar is an important part in the background of the 2005 novel The Redeemer by popular Norwegian crime-writer Jo Nesbø, in whose plot traumatized survivors of the siege arrive in Oslo and play a major role in the murder mystery which Inspector Harry Hole must solve.
- Harrison's Flowers is a French war drama from 2000, directed by Elie Chouraqui based on the novel "Diable à l' avantage" by Isabel Ellsen. The story takes place during the battle of Vukovar, in the middle of which an American woman (Andie MacDowell) searches for her missing husband, a journalist named Harrison, who disappeared during the siege. The film was shot in the United States and the Czech Republic. Starring: Andie MacDowell, Elias Koteas, Brendan Gleeson, Adrien Brody and David Strathairn.
- During the Republic of Serbian Krajina occupation of the city, Serbian director Boro Drašković filmed Vukovar, jedna priča (Vukovar: A Story, also known as Vukovar poste restante). The film was selected as the Serbian entry for the Best Foreign Language Film at the 67th Academy Awards, but was not accepted as a nominee. It has been alternately characterised as an anti-war film and as war propaganda.
- The 1991 siege and hospital massacre by JNA paramilitaries is remembered in Croatian singer-songwriter Nenad Bach's song "Vukovar."
- Dr. Luka Kovač, the ER character played by Goran Višnjić, lived in Vukovar before his arrival in the US, which was motivated by deaths of his wife and children in the Siege of Vukovar.
- Since 1984, there is Croatian Australians' Folklore ensemble "Vukovar" in Sydney.

== Gallery ==
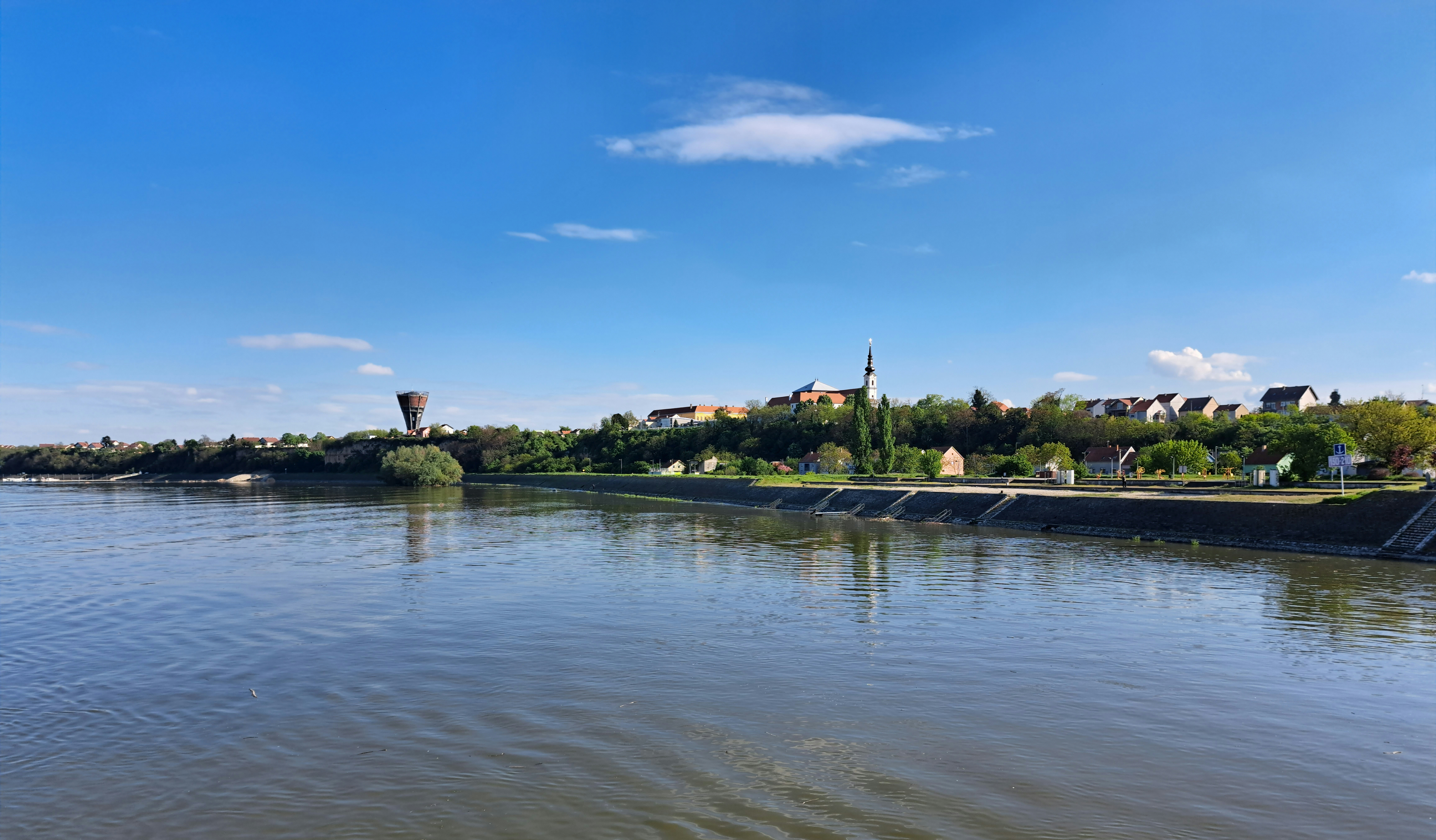
Panoramic view of Vukovar
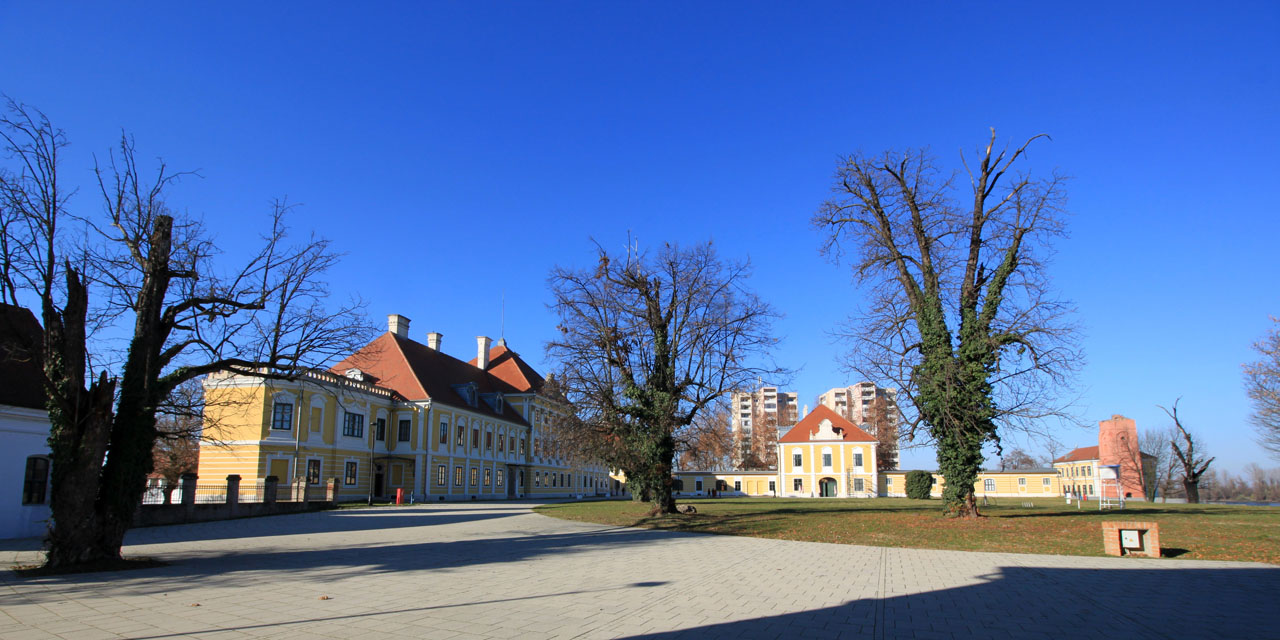
The Eltz Family Manor Complex. Castle Eltz, today's Vukovar Municipal Museum, was the main residence of the German Rhenish dynasty Eltz until 1944.
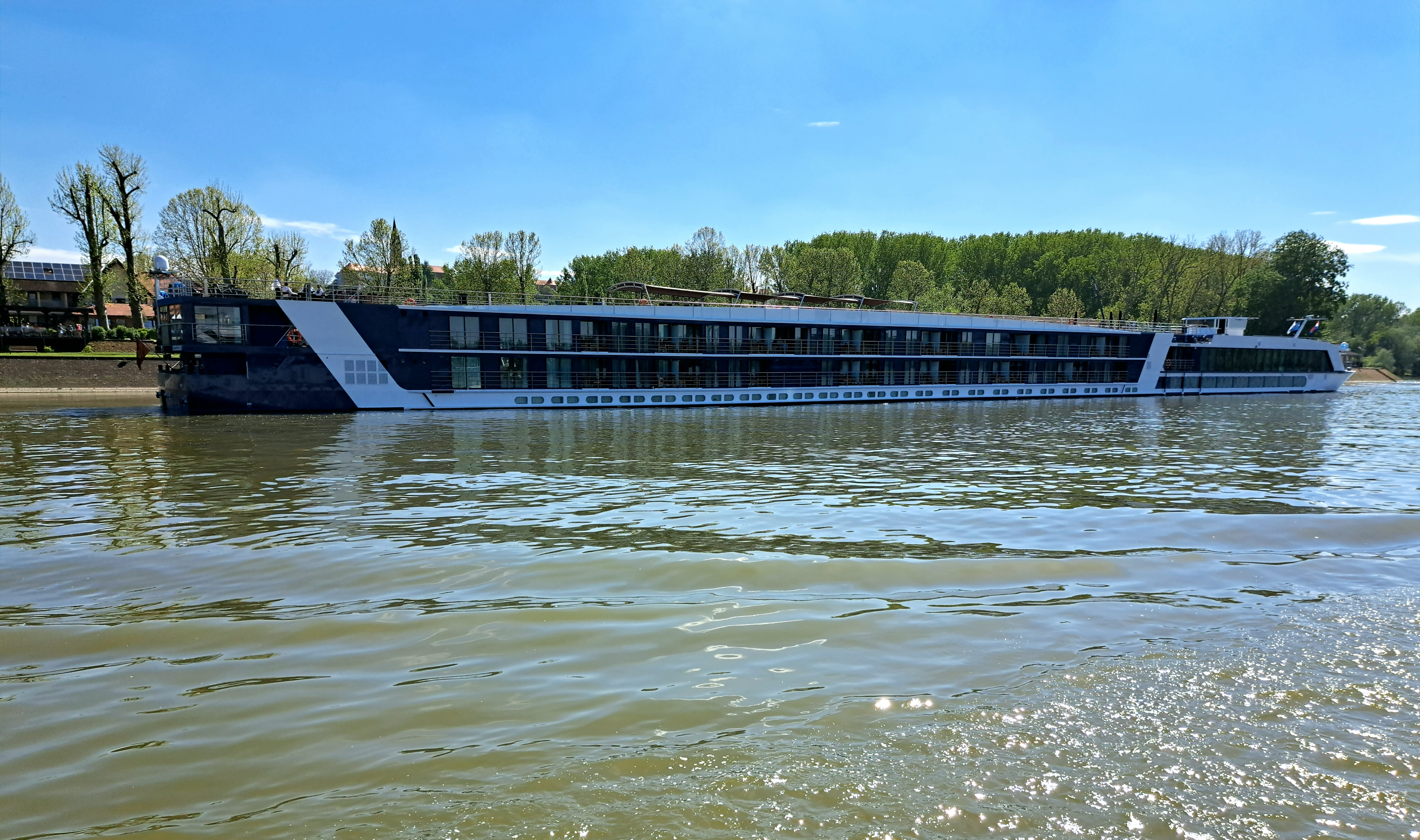
Tourist cruise ship on the Danube river, near Vukovar

== Notable people ==
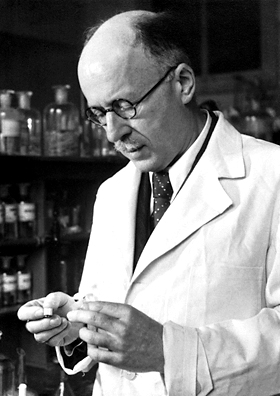
Leopold Ružička, winner of the 1939 Nobel Prize in Chemistry

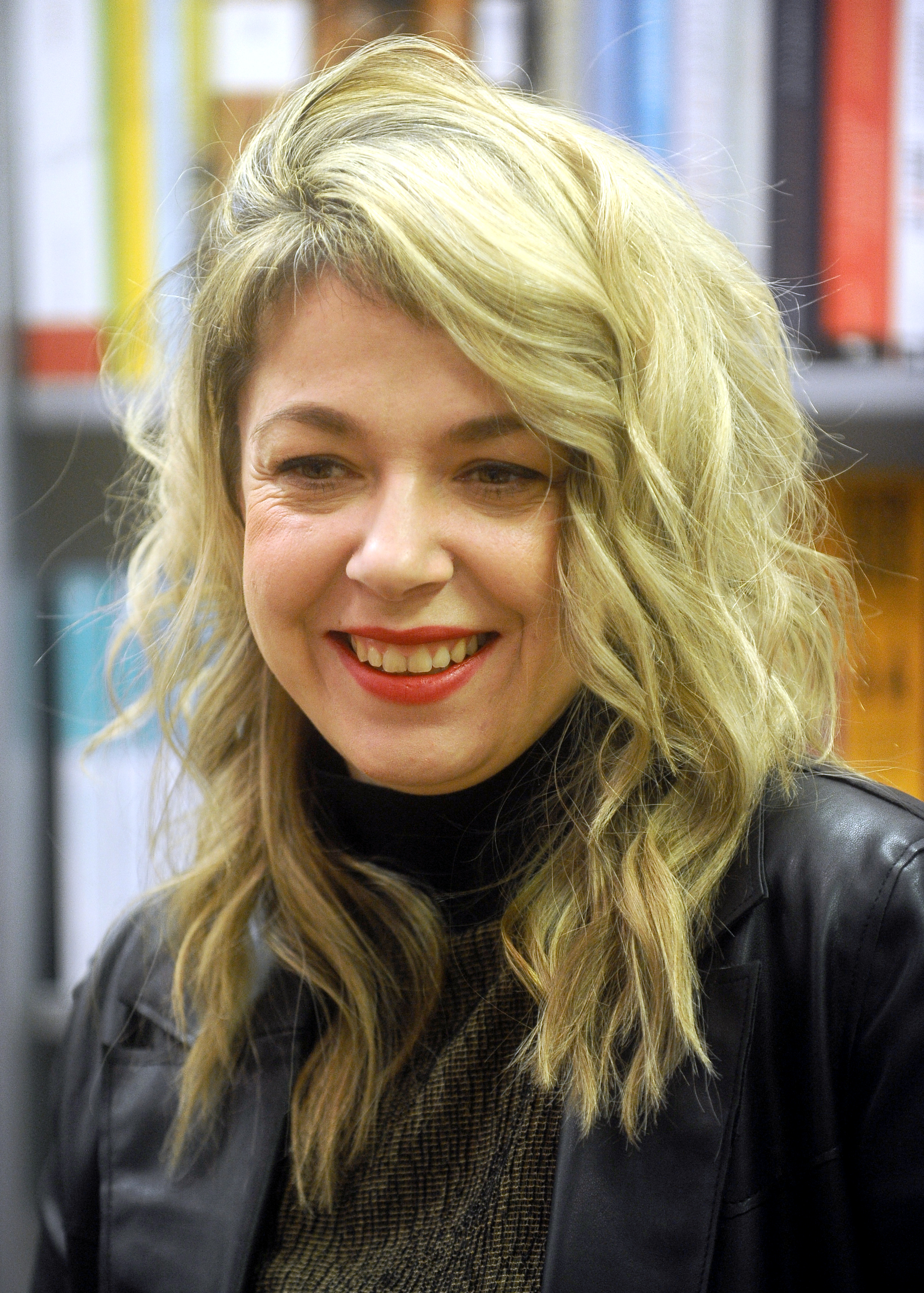
Ivana Bodrožić

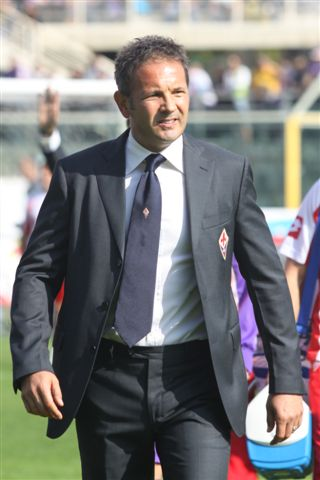
Siniša Mihajlović

- Nikola Andrić, Croatian writer, philologist and translator
- Károly Unkelhäusser, Hungarian politician
- Marko Babić, Croatian soldier
- Rudy Baker, official of the Communist Party of the United States of America
- Ivan Baran, Croatian writer
- Franjo Benzinger, Croatian pharmacist
- Damir Bičanić, Croatian handballer
- Zoran Bognar, Serbian poet and writer
- Dražen Bošnjaković, Croatian politician
- Aleksandar Čavrić, Serbian footballer
- Saša Drakulić, Serbian footballer
- Jakob Eltz, German nobleman and former member of Croatian parliament
- Milan Gajić, Serbian footballer, U-20 World champion
- Jovan Gavrilović, politician and regent to adulthood of King Milan I of Serbia
- Siniša Glavašević, Croatian reporter
- Dinko Jukić, Austrian swimmer, European champion
- Mirna Jukić, Austrian swimmer, European champion and Olympic Games bronze medalist
- Damir Kreilach, Croatian footballer
- Milan Mačvan, Serbian basketball player, Olympic Games and Eurobasket silver medalist
- Damir Martin, Croatian rower
- Tomislav Merčep, Croatian politician and paramilitary leader
- Predrag Matić, Croatian politician
- Siniša Mihajlović, Serbian footballer, European Cup champion
- Tomislav Mikulić, Croatian footballer
- Ante Miše, Croatian footballer
- Petar Mlinarić, Member of Croatian parliament
- Josip Mrzljak, Croatian prelate, bishop of Varaždin
- Zaharije Orfelin, Serbian polymath
- Pavao Pavličić, Croatian novelist
- Leopold Ružička, Nobel Prize in Chemistry
- Vladimir Štengl, Former Member of the Croatian Parliament and former mayor of Vukovar
- Blago Zadro, Croatian Army general
- Dario Zahora, Croatian footballer
- Tezija Zararić, Croatian musician

== International relations ==
=== Foreign representatives ===
- The Consulate General of Republic of Serbia in the city of Vukovar.

=== Twin towns – sister cities ===
Vukovar is twinned with cities from Croatia, Serbia, Bosnia and Herzegovina, and Slovakia:

Dubrovnik, Croatia 1993; Podstrana, Croatia 1995; Sinj, Croatia 2011; Šibenik, Croatia 2011; Trogir, Croatia 2011; Bač, Serbia 2011	Mostar, Bosnia and Herzegovina 2012; Dugopolje, Croatia 2014; Škabrnja, Croatia 2015; Makarska, Croatia 2015; Knin, Croatia 2015; Varaždin, Croatia 2017; Odžak, Bosnia and Herzegovina 2018	Imotski, Croatia 2018; Karlovac, Croatia 2018; Split, Croatia 2019; Krk, Croatia 2020; Omiš, Croatia 2022; Partizánske, Slovakia 2021

== General bibliography ==
- Barišić Bogišić, Lidija (2022). O neslavenskom stanovništvu na vukovarskom području. Hrvatska sveučilišna naklada. ISBN 978-953-169-497-1.
- Cresswell, Peterjon; Atkins, Ismay; Dunn, Lily (10 July 2006). Time Out Croatia (First ed.). London, Berkeley & Toronto: Time Out Group Ltd & Ebury Publishing, Random House Ltd. ISBN 978-1-904978-70-1.
- Cvek, Sven; Račić, Jasna; Ivčić, Snježana (2019). BOROVO U ŠTRAJKU: rad u tranziciji 1987. - 1991 (PDF). Zagreb: Rosa Luxemburg Foundation. ISBN 978-953-58721-3-9.
- Filipović, Vladimir (2022). "Srpska pobuna u selima vukovarske općine 1990. - 1991" [Serb Rebelion in the Villages of Vukovar Municipality 1990. - 1991.]. Scrinia Slavonica (in Croatian). 22 (1). Department for the History of Slavonia, Srijem and Baranja of the Croatian Institute of History: 291–319. doi:10.22586/ss.22.1.9.
- Matijević, Danijel (2024). Ustašism as Ideology and Practice: Mass Violence and Genocide in Vukovar District, Croatia, 1939–1945 (Doctor of Philosophy). University of Toronto. hdl:1807/138059.
- O'Shea, Brendan (2005). The Modern Yugoslav Conflict 1991–1995: Perception, Deception and Dishonesty. London, England: Routledge. ISBN 978-0-415-35705-0.
- Thompson, Mark (1999). Forging War: The Media in Serbia, Croatia, Bosnia and Hercegovina. Luton, England: University of Luton Press. ISBN 978-1-860-20552-1.
