= Marko Babić (soldier) =

Croatian soldier (1965–2007)

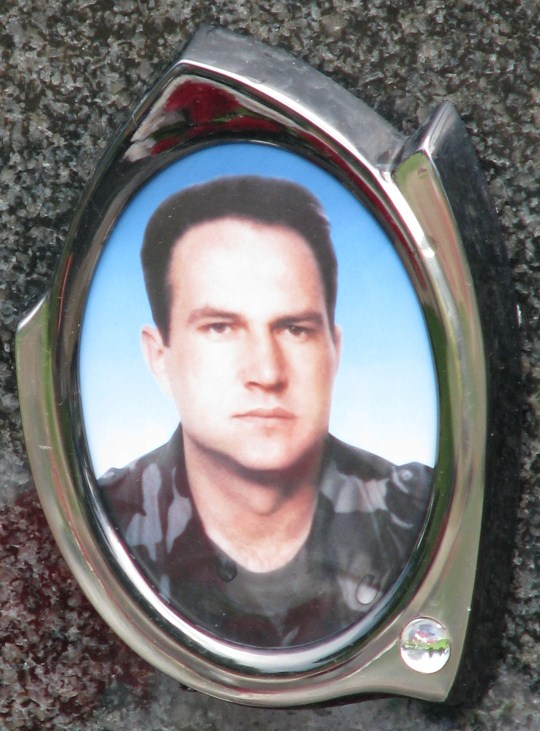
- Born: 16 February 1965; Vukovar, SR Croatia, SFR Yugoslavia
- Died: 5 July 2007 (aged 42); Zagreb, Croatia
- Burial place: Memorial Cemetery, Vukovar, Croatia
- Military career
- Allegiance: Croatia
- Branch: Croatian Army
- Service years: 1991–1997
- Rank: Colonel
- Commands: 3rd Btn of the 204th Vukovar Brigade
- Conflicts: Croatian War of Independence: Battle of Vukovar

Marko Babić (16 February 1965 – 5 July 2007) was a Croatian Army officer (Colonel at time of death) who served during the Croatian War of Independence. He is most notable for his contribution during the Battle of Vukovar, where he led the defence of Trpinjska Cesta.

Babić was second in command in the 3rd Battalion of the 204th Vukovar Brigade, under Blago Zadro. This area was one of the most direct ways to attack Vukovar, and was targeted by Yugoslav People's Army (JNA) forces for a tank breakthrough into the town. Consequently, during the period of September 14–20, 1991, JNA launched some of the largest tank and infantry attacks at the city.

One of them was started on September 18 from the north on Trpinjska cesta (Trpinja road) by the JNA's 51st Mechanized Brigade's one battalion of about 30 tanks and 30 APCs. These fell into an ambush, and were almost wiped out; as a result, an area where the fighting occurred was nicknamed tank graveyard. Marko Babić himself is credited with destroying 14 tanks, more than anyone in the battle of Vukovar. The 2nd episode of the 2005 10-part TV documentary Heroes of Vukovar is dedicated to Babić and his fighters.

He died on 5 July 2007 at the age of 42, as a result of having suffered a stroke.

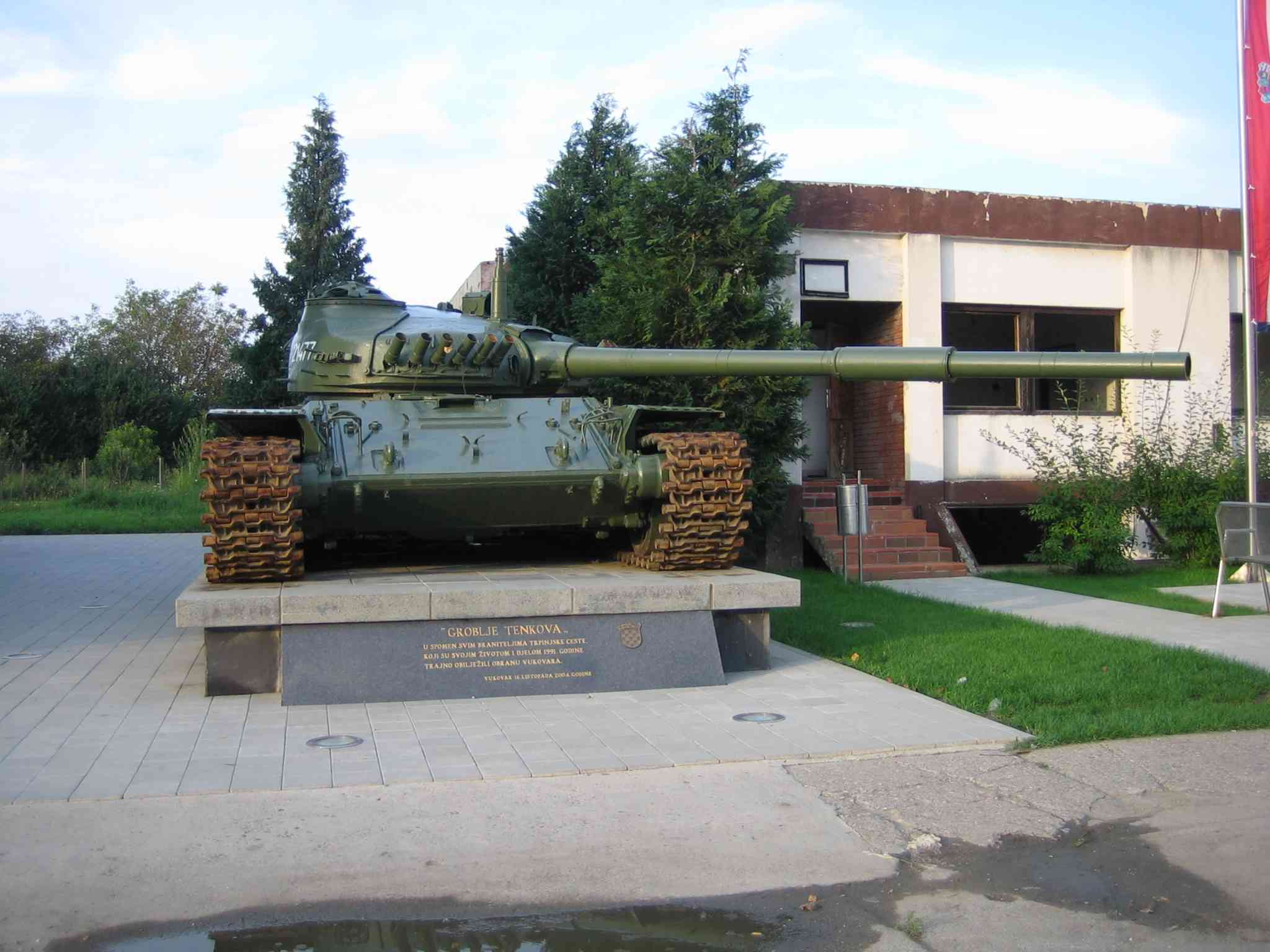
Monument to Battle of Vukovar in Trpinja road (known as tanks graveyard)
