= Bratić =

Bratić (Serbian: Братић) is a surname. Notable people with the surname include:

- Aleksandar Bratić (born 1972), Bosnian-Herzegovinian footballer
- Blagoje Bratić (1946–2008), Bosnian footballer
- Davor Bratić (born 1986), Croatian footballer
- Mladen Bratić (1933–1991), major general in the Yugoslav People's Army
- Saša Bratić (born 1981), Serbian basketball player
- Vesna Bratić (born 1977), former Minister of Education, Science, Culture and Sports of Montenegro
- Vidak Bratić (born 1976), Serbian footballer
