= Blago Zadro =

Croatian army officer (1944–1991)

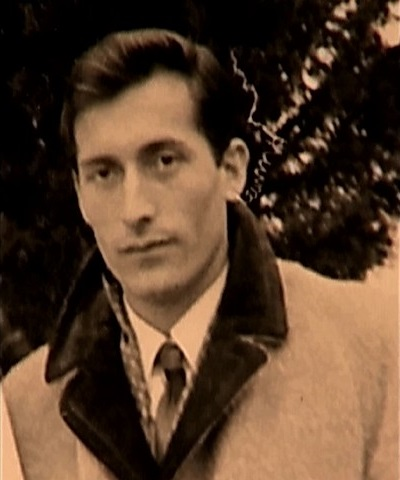
- Blago Zadro in his youth
- Born: 31 March 1944; Grude, Independent State of Croatia (now Grude, Bosnia and Herzegovina)
- Died: 16 October 1991 (aged 47); Borovo Naselje, Croatia
- Burial place: Memorial Cemetery, Vukovar, Croatia
- Spouse: Katica Soldo
- Military career
- Allegiance: Croatia
- Branch: Croatian National Guard
- Service years: 1991
- Rank: Major general (posthumously)
- Nickname: Šljuka
- Commands: 3rd Btn of the 204th Vukovar Brigade
- Conflicts: Croatian War of Independence: Battle of Vukovar †

Blago Zadro (31 March 1944 – 16 October 1991) was a commander of the northern part of Croatian forces in Vukovar during the Croatian War of Independence. He was killed in an attack by the Yugoslav People's Army (JNA) in the town of Borovo Naselje during the Battle of Vukovar. He is considered a war hero in Croatia.

== Early life ==
Blago Zadro was born in the small village of Donji Mamići near Grude in western Herzegovina. His family moved to Borovo Naselje, an industrial district of Vukovar, in 1954 where he graduated high school and started working in the Borovo combine. He had a job mixing chemicals and rubber. In 1968 he married Katica Soldo, also an employee of Borovo. They had three sons: Robert, Tomislav, and Josip. Zadro was interested in Croatian history, particularly the Bleiburg death marches, and was not a supporter of the Communist authorities.

In early 1990, due to mismanagement of the Borovo conglomerate, Zadro organized strikes and asked for the dismissal of the director. Zadro became active in politics during Croatia's first democratic election in 1990; he founded a branch of the Croatian Democratic Union (HDZ) for Municipality of Vukovar and became the vice president of the HDZ in Vukovar. After his department was closed, he spent three months in the reorganized Croatian police force in Vinkovci. He joined the Croatian National Guard when the war started.

== Battle of Vukovar ==
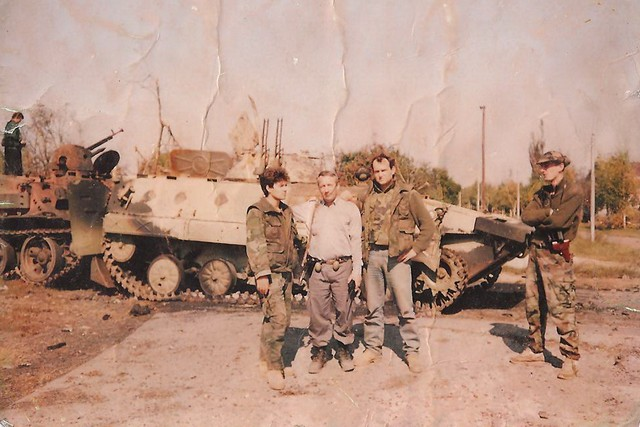
Blago Zadro (middle) on the Trpinja road during the Battle of Vukovar

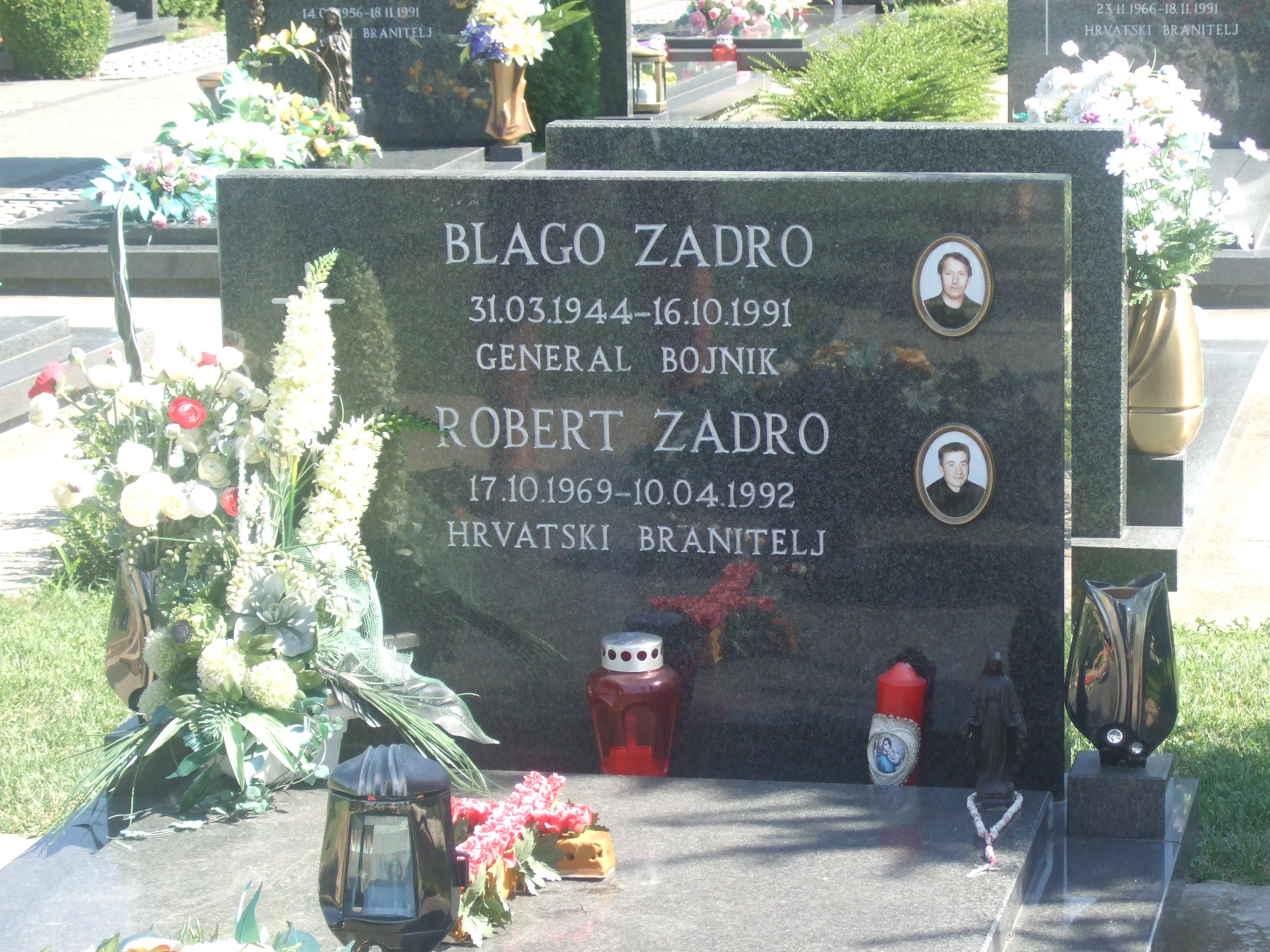
Blago Zadro's grave

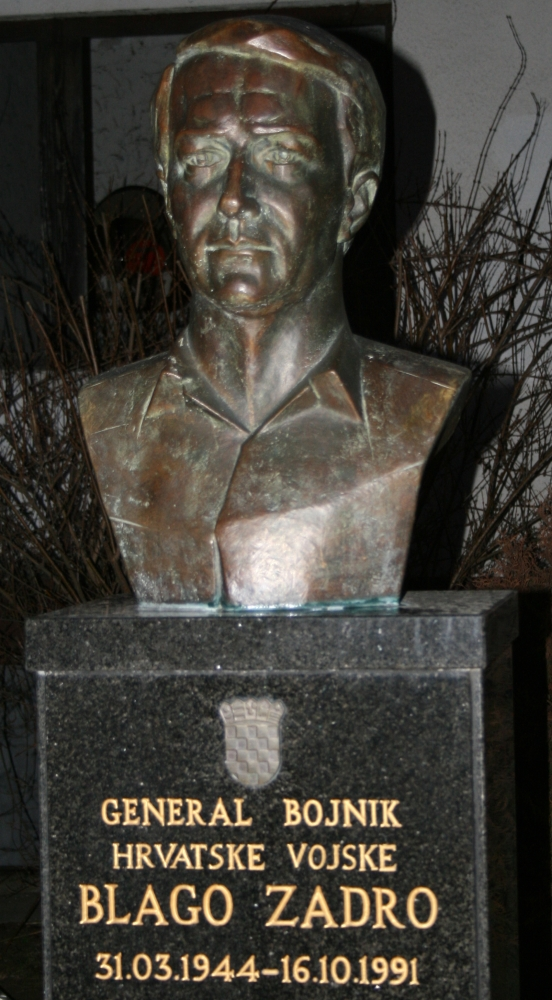
Bust of Blago Zadro in Vukovar

Zadro had commanded the 3rd Battalion of the 204th (Vukovar) Croatian Army Brigade during Battle of Vukovar since the start of the fighting, along with two of his sons, where he led actions against the Yugoslav People's Army (JNA) and local Serb forces. Zadro's unit was assigned to defend the vital Trpinja road (Croatian: Trpinjska cesta), an open road leading directly into Vukovar. Because of its importance, the road became primary target for JNA tank units attacking the city and it became known as the tank graveyard due to actions of Zadro's anti-tank rocket groups "Yellow Ants" and "Turbo Platoon" which fought off many tank attacks, notably a single incident on 18 September when an entire battalion of about 60 tanks and armored personnel carriers was ambushed and destroyed there.

Zadro was killed by Serb forces on 16 October 1991. His body was recovered and buried by his unit. When the Serb forces surrendered the city, his body was removed and remained missing until 1998, when it was found along with the bodies of 937 other victims from a mass grave in Borovo Naselje. After his death, he was promoted to the rank of major general.

== Legacy ==
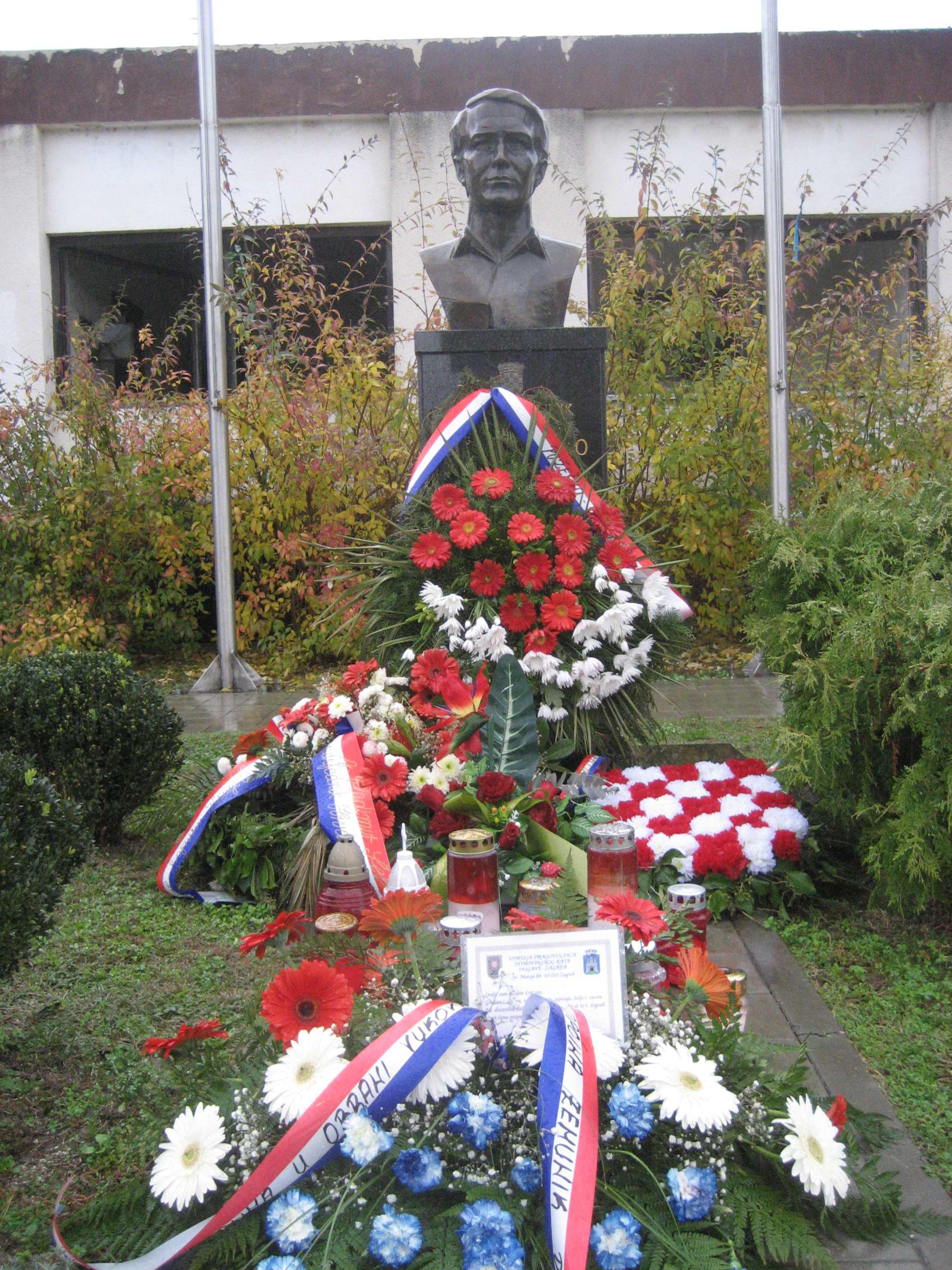
Blago Zadro Memorial in Vukovar, Trpinjska Street

Speaker of the Croatian Parliament Vladimir Šeks stated "without heroes like Blago Zadro, there would be no free Croatia". A commemoration for him is held every year on the anniversary of his death in Vukovar, attended by many former comrades and political dignitaries. The main street in Borovo Naselje and a military school in Zagreb have been named after him. A street in Grude was named after him and in his birth village Donji Mamići was placed a monument in his tribute.
