= Vukovar water tower =

Water tower in Vukovar, Croatia

- Vukovarski vodotoranj
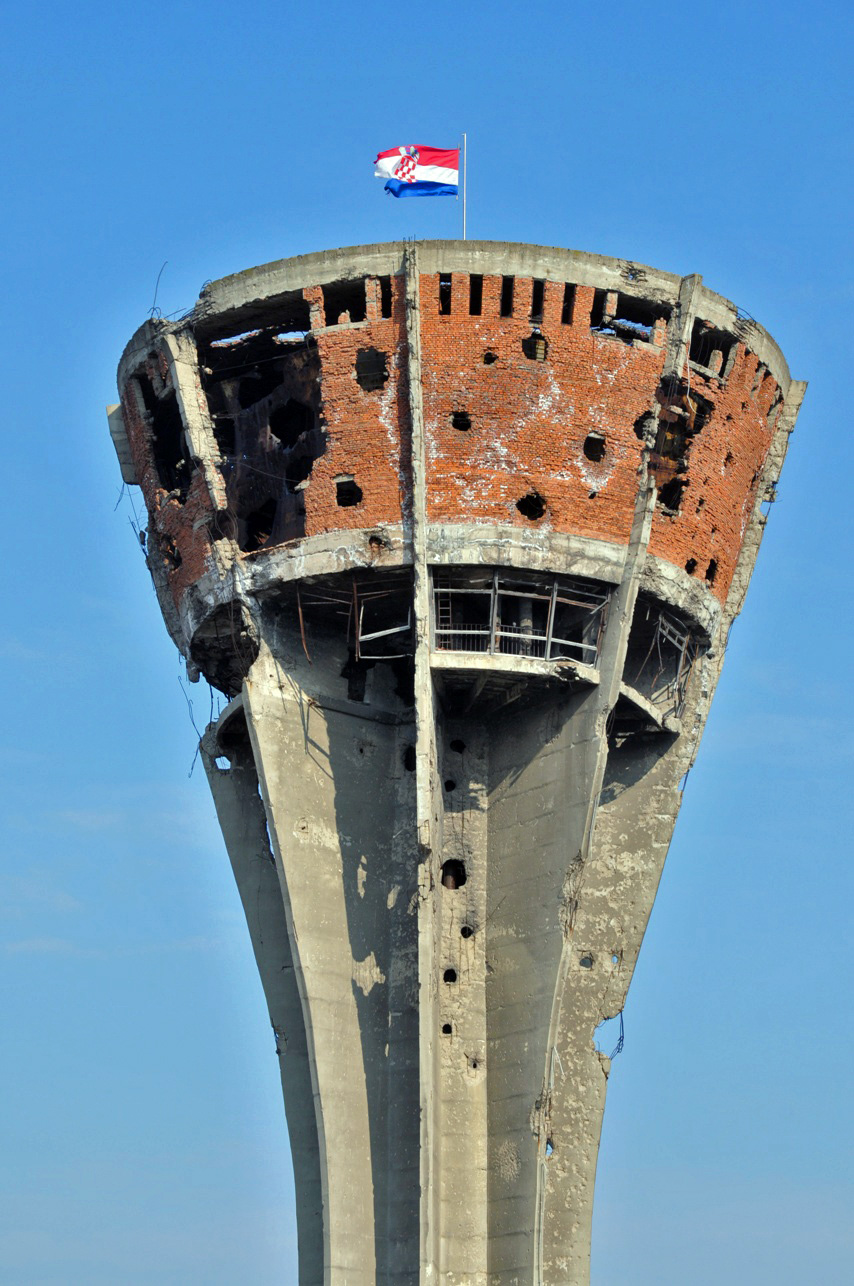
- Vukovar water tower after the Croatian War of Independence.

- Location within Croatia

General information
- Status: Restored
- Type: Water tower
- Location: Vukovar, Croatia
- Coordinates: 45.3440°N 19.0122°E
- Construction started: 1962
- Completed: 1968

Height
- Height: 50.3 m (165 ft)

Dimensions
- Other dimensions: 2,200 m^{3} (78,000 cu ft) water capacity

Design and construction
- Architect: Plan d.o.o.
- Main contractor: Hidrotehna Zagreb d.o.o.

Website
- https://vukovarskivodotoranj.hr/

The Vukovar water tower (Croatian: Vukovarski vodotoranj) is a structure in Vukovar, Croatia. Built in 1968 in the Socialist Republic of Croatia in Yugoslavia, it became a symbol of the Croatian War of Independence. During the 1991 siege, Vukovar was attacked by the Yugoslav People's Army and Serbian paramilitary forces.

== History ==
Vukovar water tower before the war

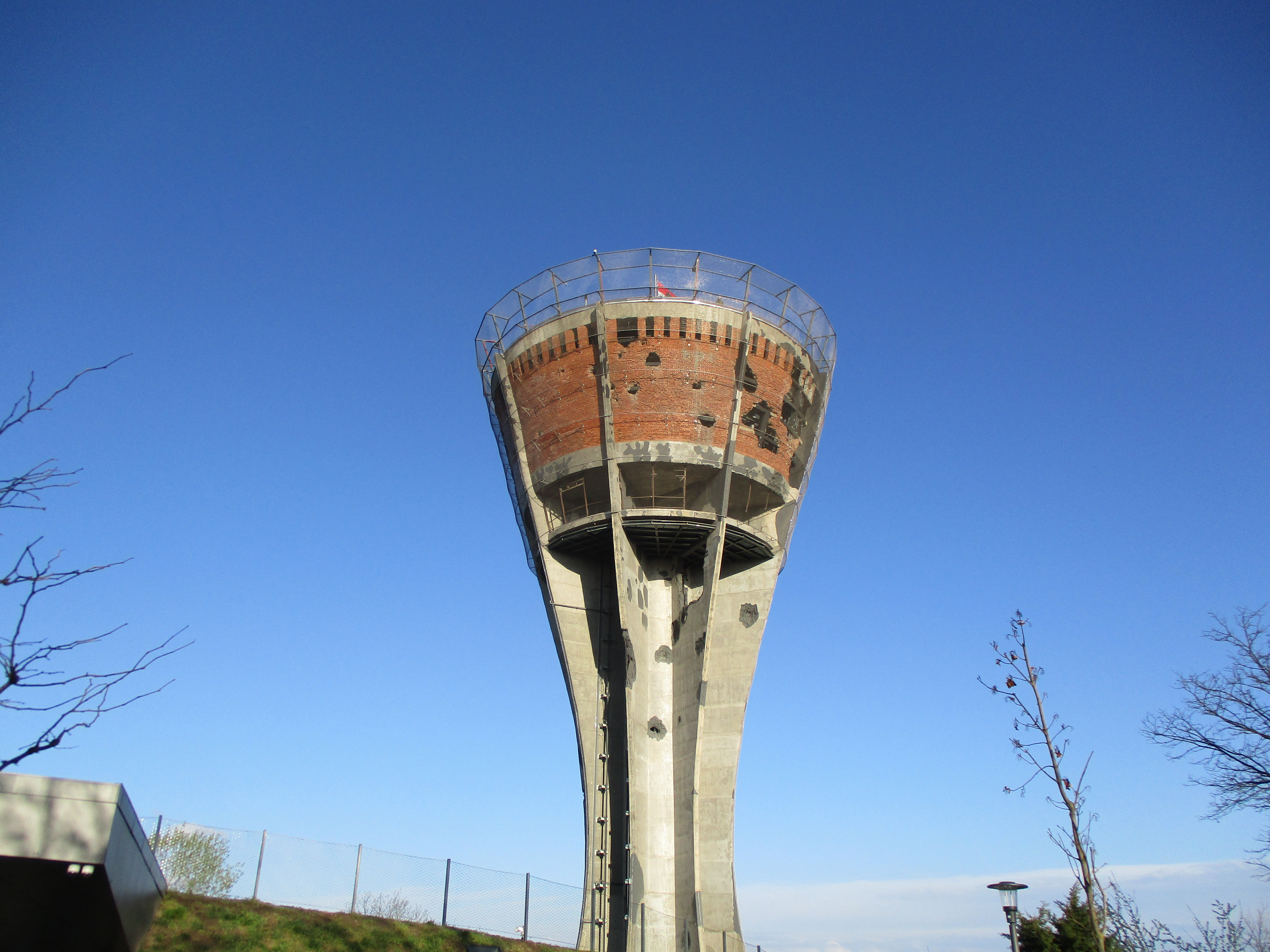
The water tower after its preservation as a monument

The water tower was designed by the company Plan and built by Hidrotehna Zagreb. Construction started in 1962, and was completed in 1968. It was built in a city park, popularly known as Najpar-bašća, in the district of Mitnica.

It is 50 meters tall and featured a water tank with a capacity of 2200 m^{3}. With its water tank full, it weighed 9000 tons.

Until the war, the top of the tower was home to a restaurant with a view over Vukovar, Danube and surrounding vineyards.

During the Battle of Vukovar, the water tower was one of the most frequent targets of artillery. It was hit more than 600 times during the siege.

Today, it has been converted into a museum with a restaurant. Traces of the war are still evident. Since 10 March 2021 it has been a Tower Member of the World Federation of Great Towers.

== Present ==
After the reintegration of Vukovar into the Republic of Croatia, reconstruction of the water tower was initiated by Croatian President Franjo Tuđman, but the process was dropped and the tower instead became a memorial area to the pain and suffering that Vukovar endured. It was officially opened on 30 October 2020, with public access becoming available the following day.
