= Mladen Bratić =

Serbian military commander (1933–1991)

- Born: 6 June 1933; Podgrađe, Kingdom of Yugoslavia (now Podgrađe, Bosnia and Herzegovina)
- Died: 2 November 1991 (aged 58); Borovo Naselje, Vukovar, Croatia
- Burial place: New Cemetery, Belgrade
- Military career
- Allegiance: (Socialist Federal Republic of Yugoslavia) SFR Yugoslavia
- Branch: Yugoslav People's Army
- Service years: 1951–1991
- Rank: Major general
- Unit: Novi Sad corps
- Commands: Northern AOR
- Conflicts: Croatian War; Battle of Vukovar †

Mladen Bratić (Serbian: Младен Братић; 6 June 1933 – 2 November 1991) was a major general in the Yugoslav People's Army (JNA).

A Bosnian Serb, Bratić was killed in the Battle of Vukovar when his tank was hit by a Croatian National Guard shell, but the JNA's advantage in artillery and rockets enabled it to halt the Croatian advance and inflict heavy casualties. The battle ended up resulting in a Yugoslav/Serbian pyrrhic victory.
