= Tank graveyard =

Term for an area containing derelict armored vehicles

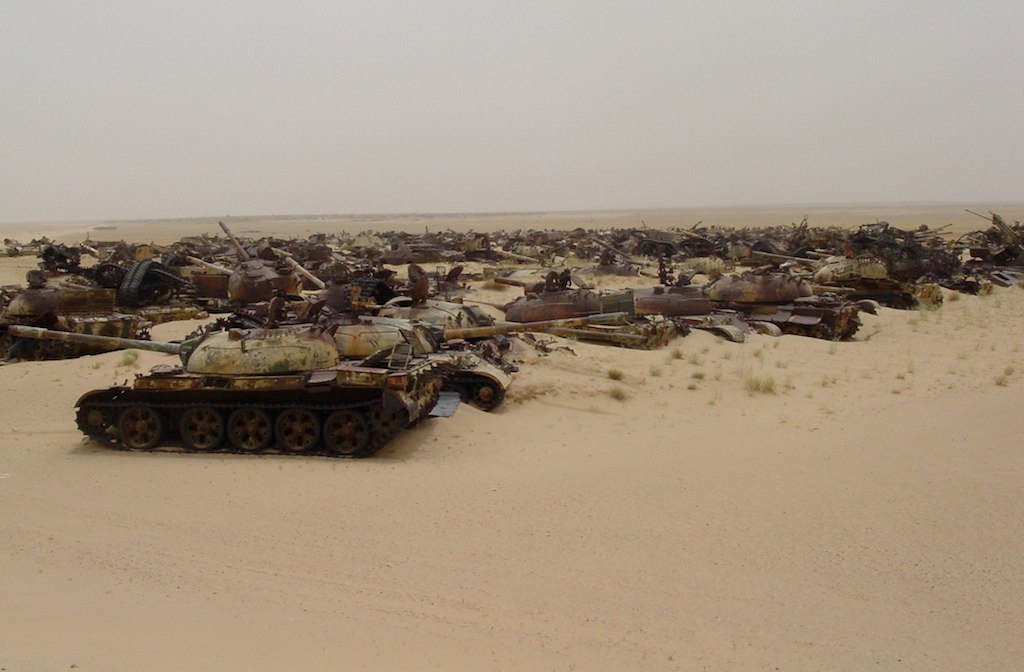
Iraqi tanks in the Kuwaiti desert, 2004

The term tank graveyard or tank cemetery refers to an area containing a number of derelict armored vehicles, generally as a result of warfare.

While they often are only a last resting place for destroyed, broken down or outdated equipment, tank graveyards can be a source of parts to produce new or restored vehicles. Ukraine has for instance been able to field hundreds of new tanks to fight in the Russo-Ukrainian War by cannibalizing those sitting in graveyards since the Soviet era.

== Notable tank graveyards ==
- Vukovar, Croatia (Battle of Vukovar, Croatian War of Independence)
- Kabul, Afghanistan (Soviet–Afghan War)
- Khemkaran, India (1965 India Pakistan War)
- Chawinda, Pakistan (1965 India Pakistan War)
- Longewala, India (1971 India Pakistan War )
- Highway of Death, north of Kuwait City, Kuwait (1991, Operation Desert Storm)
- Asmara, Eritrea (Eritrean War of Independence)
