= Mladen =

Slavic masculine given name

- Pronunciation: Serbo-Croatian: [ˈmlâ.dɛn]
- Gender: masculine

Origin
- Language: Slavic

Other names
- Derived: mlad ("young")

Mladen (Cyrillic: Младен) is a South Slavic masculine given name, derived from the Slavic root mlad (*moldъ, mladъ), meaning "young". It is present in Bosnian, Slovenian, Montenegrin, Macedonian, Bulgarian, Serbian, and Croatian society since the Middle Ages.

== Notable people with the name ==
- Mladen (vojvoda), Serbian magnate
- Mladen I Šubić (died 1304), Croatian nobleman
- Mladen II Šubić (1270–1341), Croatian nobleman
- Mladen III Šubić (1315–1348), Croatian nobleman

=== A-J ===
- Mladen Bajić (born 1950), Croatian lawyer
- Mladen Banović, Croatian electrotechnics scientist
- Mladen Bartolović (1977–2026), Bosnian footballer
- Mladen Bartulović (born 1986), Croatian football player and manager
- Mladen Bašić (1917–2012), Croatian pianist and conductor
- Mladen Bestvina (born 1959), Croatian-American mathematician
- Mladen Bodalec (born 1959), Croatian rock musician
- Mladen Bogdanović (1960–2003), Yugoslav footballer
- Mladen Bojanić (born 1962), Montenegrin economist and politician
- Mladen Bojinović (born 1977), Serbian handball player
- Mladen Bosić (born 1961), Bosnian Serb politician
- Mladen Bošković (born 1987), Serbian politician
- Mladen Božović (born 1984), Montenegrin footballer
- Mladen Bratić (1933–1991), Yugoslav military general
- Mladen Brestovac (born 1983), Croatian kickboxer
- Mladen Brkić (born 1980), Serbian footballer
- Mladen Budiščak (1947–2003), Croatian actor
- Mladen Čolić (born 1982), Serbian pianist
- Mladen Čučić (born 1983), Croatian footballer
- Mladen Cukon (born 1946), Croatian footballer
- Mladen Dabanovič (born 1971), Slovenian footballer
- Mladen Delić (1919–2005), Croatian sports commentator
- Mladen Devetak (born 1999), Serbian footballer
- Mladen Dodić (born 1969), Serbian football player and manager
- Mladen Dolar (born 1951), Slovenian philosopher
- Mladen Dražetin (1951–2015), Serbian writer, poet and philosopher
- Mladen Đurić, Serbian politician
- Mladen Erjavec (born 1970), Croatian basketball player and coach
- Mladen Frančić (1955–2022), Croatian football manager
- Mladen Furtula (born 1950), Bosnian footballer
- Mladen Galić (born 1987), Serbian footballe
- Mladen Georgiev (1940–2003), Bulgarian wrestler
- Mladen Grdović (born 1958), Croatian pop singer
- Mladen Grujić (born 1966), Serbian politician and entrepreneur
- Mladen Grujić (biathlete) (born 1969), Yugoslav biathlete
- Mladen Grujičić (born 1982), Bosnian Serb politician
- Mladen Guteša (1923–2015), Yugoslav orchestra conductor and composer
- Mladen Hren (born 1998), Croatian actor
- Mladen Ivanić (born 1958), Bosnian Serb politician
- Mladen Ivanković-Lijanović (born 1960), Bosnian politician and businessman
- Mladen Ivančić (film promoter) (born 1955), New Zealand film official of Croatian descent
- Mladen Ivančić (footballer) (born 1970), Croatian footballer
- Mladen Iveković (1903–1970), Croatian politician and diplomat
- Mladen Janković (1831–1885), Serbian physician
- Mladen Jeremić (born 1988), Serbian basketball player
- Mladen Josić (1897–1972), Serbian painter
- Mladen Juran (born 1942), Croatian film director and actor
- Mladen Jurčević (born 1983), Bosnian footballer
- Mladen Jutrić (born 1996), Austrian footballer

=== K-P ===
- Mladen Kalpic (born 1977), Serbian journalist and filmmaker
- Mladen Kapor (born 1966), Yugoslav swimmer
- Mladen Karoglan (born 1964), Croatian footballer
- Mladen Kašćelan (born 1983), Montenegrin football player and coach
- Mladen Kašić (born 1958), Croatian volleyball player and coach
- Mladen Khristov (born 1946), Bulgarian water polo player
- Mladen Kiselov (1943–2012), Bulgarian stage director and professor
- Mladen Knežević (born 1979), Serbian actor
- Mladen Kocić (born 1988), Serbian futsal player
- Mladen Kolobarić (1933–2009), Bosnian painter and graphic designer
- Mladen Košćak (1936–1997), Croatian footballer
- Mladen Kovačević (born 1994), Serbian footballer
- Mladen Kovačevič (born 1980), Slovenian footballer
- Mladen Kranjc (1945–1988), Croatian-Slovenian footballer
- Mladen Križanović (born 1977), Croatian footballer
- Mladen Krstajić (born 1974), Serbian footballer
- Mladen Kuchev (born 1947), Bulgarian weightlifter
- Mladen Kujundžić (born 1989), Croatian kickboxer and mixed martial artist
- Mladen Kukrika (born 1991), Bosnian footballer
- Mladen Lambulić (born 1972), Montenegrin football player and manager
- Mladen Lazarević (born 1984), Serbian footballer
- Mladen Lorković (1909–1945), Croatian politician and lawyer
- Mladen Lukić (born 1977), Serbian politician
- Mladen Marinov (born 1971), Bulgarian politician
- Mladen Markač (born 1955), Croatian military general
- Mladen Matković (born 1989), Croatian footballer
- Mladen Mićanović (born 1996), Serbian footballer
- Mladen Mihajlović (born 1985), Serbian basketball coach
- Mladen Milicevic (born 1958), Bosnian-American composer and university professor
- Mladen Milinković (born 1968), Serbian football player and coach
- Mladen Milovanović (1760–1823), Serbian merchant and politician
- Mladen Mitić, Bosnian guitarist
- Mladen Mladenov (wrestler) (born 1957), Bulgarian wrestler
- Mladen Mladenov (diplomat) (1921–1996), Bulgarian diplomat
- Mladen Mladenović (born 1964), Croatian football manager and player
- Mladen Munjaković (born 1961), Croatian footballer
- Mladen Muše (born 1963), German-Croatian chess grandmaster
- Mladen Naletilić Tuta (1946–2021), Bosnian Croat paramilitary commander
- Mladen Ninić (born 1950), Croatian rower
- Mladen Palac (born 1971), Croatian chess player
- Mladen Pantić (born 1982), Serbian basketball player
- Mladen Pelaić (born 1983), Croatian footballer
- Mladen Petrić (born 1981), Croatian footballer
- Mladen Petrov Chervenyakov (born 1954), Bulgarian politician
- Mladen Plakalović (born 1991), Bosnian cross-country skier
- Mladen Popović (born 1988), Serbian footballer
- Mladen Posavec (born 1971), Croatian football player and manager
- Mladen Pralija (born 1959), Croatian footballer
- Mladen Prskalo (born 1968), Croatian handball player

=== R-Z ===
- Mladen Rakčević (born 1982), Montenegrin handball player
- Mladen Ramljak (1945–1978), Croatian footballer
- Mladen Ristić (born 1982), Serbian footballer
- Mladen Romić (1962–2006), Croatian footballer
- Mladen Rudonja (born 1971), Slovenian footballer
- Mladen Sarajlin (born 1995), Serbian footballer
- Mladen Šarčević (born 1957), Serbian politician
- Mladen Sarić (1911–1997), Serbian footballer
- Mladen Šekularac (born 1981), Montenegrin basketball player
- Mladen Sekulovich (1912–2009), known as Karl Malden, American actor
- Mlađen Šljivančanin (born 1985), Serbian basketball player
- Mladen Solomun (born 1975), known as Solomun, Bosnian-German DJ and music producer
- Mladen Srbinović (1925–2009), Serbian painter
- Mladen Stanev (born 1974), Bulgarian conductor and chorus master
- Mladen Stefanov (born 1977), Bulgarian gymnast
- Mladen Stegić (born 1980), Serbian rower
- Mladen Stilinović (1947–2016), Croatian conceptual artist
- Mladen Stipić (1929–2013), Bosnian footballer
- Mladen Stoev (born 1984), Bulgarian footballer
- Mladen Stojanović (1896–1942), Bosnian Serb leader of Yugoslav Partisans
- Mladen Stojanović (died 1885), known as Čakr-paša, Serbian brigand and rebel leader
- Mladen Šubarić (1908–1991), Croatian chess player
- Mladen Tarbuk (born 1962), Croatian conductor and composer
- Mladen Urem (born 1964), Croatian writer and literary critic
- Mladen Vasilev (born 1947), Bulgarian footballer
- Mladen Velimirović, Yugoslav film director and photographer
- Mladen Veselinović (Bosnian footballer) (born 1993)
- Mladen Veselinović (Serbian footballer) (born 1992)
- Mladen Veža (1916–2010), Croatian painter
- Mladen Vilotijević (born 1935), Serbian academic and author
- Mladen Vitković (born 1990), Serbian basketball player
- Mladen Vladojević, Serbian nobleman
- Mladen Vojičić Tifa (born 1960), Bosnian rock vocalist
- Mladen Vranic (1930–2019), Croatian-Canadian diabetes researcher
- Mladen Vranković (1937–2021), Croatian footballer
- Mladen Vujić (born 1998), Serbian basketball player
- Mladen Vukasović (born 1992), Montenegrin footballer
- Mladen Vulić (born 1969), Croatian actor
- Mladen Wacha (born 1942), Croatian footballer
- Mladen Zeljković (born 1987), Serbian footballer
- Mladen Žganjer (born 1966), Croatian football player and coach
- Mladen Živković (born 1989), Serbian footballer
- Mladen Žižović (1980–2025), Bosnian football player and manager
- Mladen Zrilić (born 1986), Serbian volleyball player
- Mladen Žujović (1895–1969), Serbian attorney and professor of law

== See also ==
- Sebastian Mladen (born 1991), Romanian footballer
- Mladenov
- Mladenović
- Slavic names
