= Goran Hadžić =

Croatian Serb politician and war criminal (1958–2016)

- Горан Хаџић
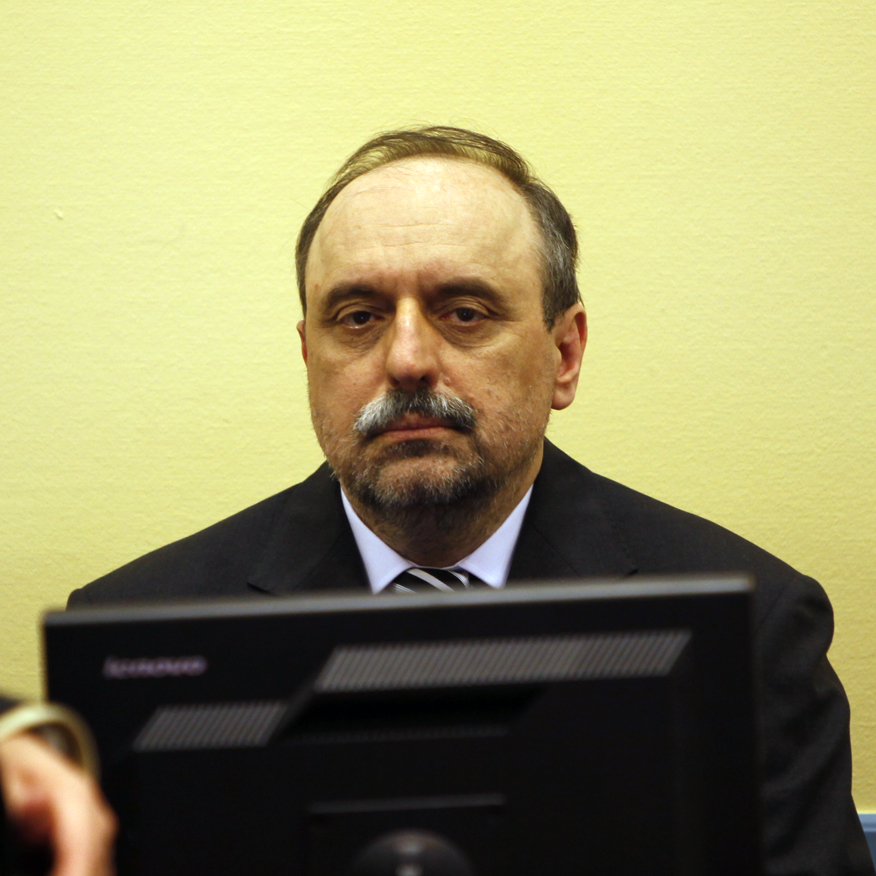
- Hadžić in 2011

2nd President of the Republic of Serbian Krajina
- In office 26 February 1992 – 26 January 1994
- Prime Minister: Zdravko Zečević; Đorđe Bjegović
- Preceded by: Milan Babić
- Succeeded by: Milan Martić

Prime Minister of SAO Eastern Slavonia, Baranja and Western Syrmia
- In office 1991 – 26 February 1992
- Preceded by: Veljko Džakula

President of the Coordinating Committee of Eastern Slavonia, Baranja and Western Syrmia
- In office 23 April 1996 – 15 January 1998
- Preceded by: Slavko Dokmanović

Personal details
- Born: 7 September 1958 Pačetin, PR Croatia, Yugoslavia
- Died: 12 July 2016 (aged 57) Novi Sad, Serbia
- Party: League of Communists of Yugoslavia; Serb Democratic Party
- Children: Srećko Hadžić

Goran Hadžić (Serbian Cyrillic: Горан Хаџић, pronounced [ɡǒran xǎdʒiːtɕ]; 7 September 1958 – 12 July 2016) was a Croatian Serb politician and President of the self-proclaimed Republic of Serbian Krajina, during the Croatian War of Independence. He was accused of crimes against humanity and of violation of the laws and customs of war by the International Criminal Tribunal for the former Yugoslavia.

Hadžić was charged with 14 counts of war crimes and crimes against humanity. The charges included criminal involvement in the "deportation or forcible transfer of tens of thousands of Croat and other non-Serb civilians" from Croatian territory between June 1991 and December 1993, including 20,000 from Vukovar; the forced labour of detainees; the "extermination or murder of hundreds of Croat and other non-Serb civilians" in ten Croatian towns and villages including Vukovar; and the "torture, beatings and killings of detainees", including 264 victims seized from Vukovar Hospital.

Serbian authorities captured Hadžić in 2011; he was the last remaining fugitive of the Tribunal. In 2014, he was diagnosed with terminal brain cancer and died two years later at the age of 57. The ICTY trial was terminated upon his death.

== Early life ==
Hadžić was born in the village of Pačetin, at the time in PR Croatia, FPR Yugoslavia; and in his youth was politically active as a member of the League of Communists of Yugoslavia. Prior to the Croatian War of Independence, Hadžić worked as a warehouseman. He was president of the local community of Pačetin. In the Spring of 1990, as a representative of the League of Communists Party for Democratic Changes, he was elected to the Municipal Committee of Vukovar.

On 10 June 1990, he joined the Serbian Democratic Party (SDS) and was elected president of the party's branch in Vukovar. In March 1991 he was president of the Municipal Committee of Vukovar, a member of the Main Committee and Executive Committee of the Serb Democratic Party in Knin, and president of the Regional Committee of the Serb Democratic Party for Eastern Slavonia, Baranja and Western Syrmia. Before 25 June 1991, he was a leader of the Serbian National Council of Slavonia, Baranja and Western Syrmia and of the Serbian Democratic Forum, which covered Eastern Slavonia, Baranja and Western Syrmia.

== Croatian War ==
Hadžić was involved in the Plitvice Lakes incident in late March 1991, beginning the Croatian War of Independence. On 25 June 1991, a group of eastern Slavonian Serbs organized a congress (Velika narodna skupština Slavonije Baranje i Zapadnog Srema) where they decided to constitute a "Serb Autonomous Oblast" (SAO) of the region, the SAO Eastern Slavonia, Baranja and Western Syrmia, and also to separate the region from the Republic of Croatia, which was still part of Yugoslavia. Hadžić was elected as a candidate to lead the entity's government.

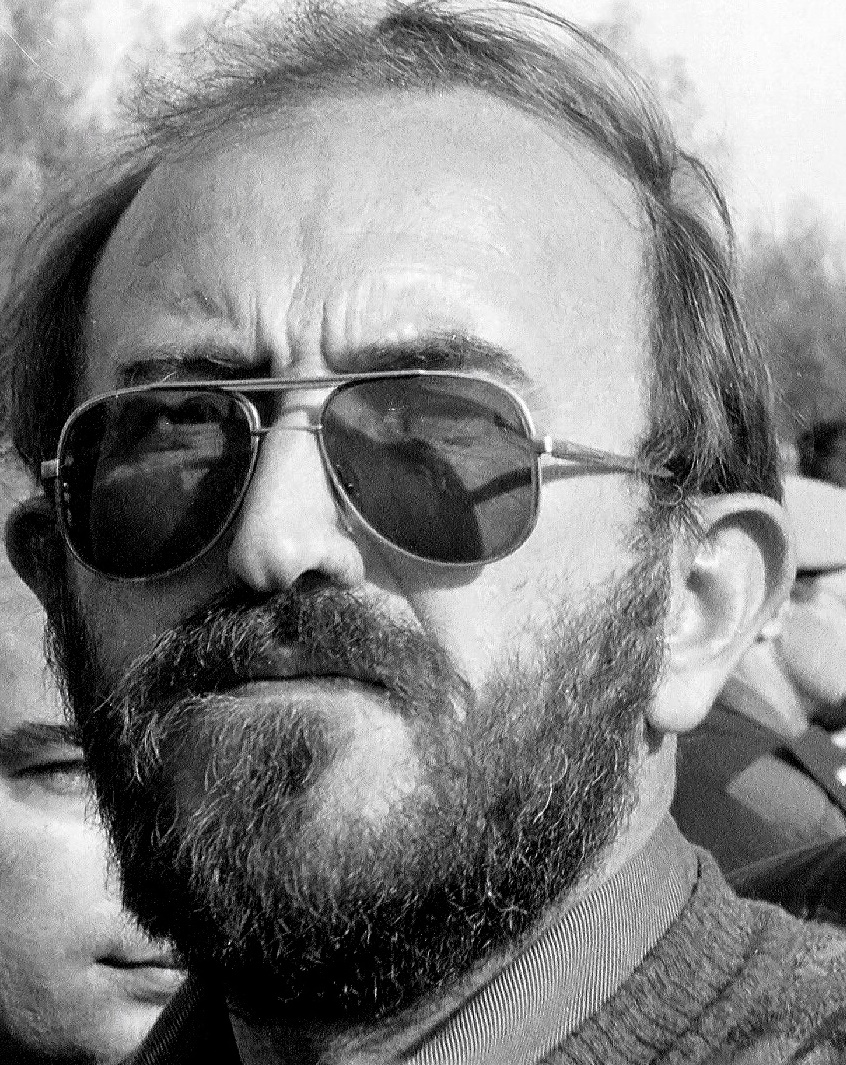
Hadžić in 1992

On 26 February 1992 the two Slavonian SAOs formally joined the self-proclaimed Republic of Serbian Krajina (RSK), while the Assembly of the RSK replaced Milan Babić with Hadžić as the new Premier of the Republic of Serbian Krajina. Babić was deposed because he argued against the Vance peace plan, unlike Milošević. Hadžić was reported to have boasted that he was "a messenger for Slobodan Milošević". He held the leadership position until December 1993.

In September 1993, when Croatia started Operation Medak Pocket, Hadžić sent an urgent request to Belgrade for reinforcements, arms and equipment. The request was ignored by the Serbian officials, although some 4,000 paramilitaries under the command of Arkan (Serb Volunteer Guard), arrived, to bolster the RSK army. In February 1994, Hadžić's presidency ended when Milan Martić was elected president. In 1995, he threatened to have the eastern Slavonian district secede from Krajina because of plans to unite Krajina with Republika Srpska.

After Operation Storm in August 1995, parts of RSK in eastern Slavonia remained outside the Croatian government's control. Between 1996 and 1997, Hadžić was President of the Srem-Baranja district, after which the region was peacefully reintegrated into Croatia under the provisions of the Erdut Agreement. Hadžić subsequently moved to Serbia in the Federal Republic of Yugoslavia. In 2000, he attended the funeral of indicted war criminal Željko Ražnatović-Arkan in Belgrade, calling him a "big hero".

== Croatian war crimes charges ==
Hadžić was prosecuted and tried in absentia in Croatia on two counts: in 1995 he was convicted for rocket attacks on Šibenik and Vodice, and sentenced to 20 years in prison; in 1999 he was convicted for war crimes in Tenja, near Osijek, and sentenced to an additional 20 years imprisonment. In 2001, Interpol put him on its Most Wanted Fugitives list and issued a Red corner notice.

In 2002, Croatia's state attorney brought another indictment against Hadžić, the so-called Vukovar Three (Veselin Šljivančanin, Mile Mrkšić and Miroslav Radić) and the Yugoslav People's Army's senior commanders, alleging the murder of almost 1,300 Croats in Vukovar, Osijek, Vinkovci, Županja and elsewhere.

== ICTY charges ==
The International Criminal Tribunal for the former Yugoslavia indicted Hadžić for war crimes on 4 June 2004.

Hadžić faced 14 counts of war crimes and crimes against humanity for his alleged involvement in the forcible removal and murder of thousands of Croatian civilians from the Republic of Croatia between 1991 and 1993. His indictment specifically cites the 1991 Vukovar massacre of 250 mostly Croats, from the Vukovar hospital; the Dalj, Erdut and Lovas massacres; involvement in Stajićevo, Begejci and Sremska Mitrovica camps; and the alleged wanton destruction of homes and religious and cultural buildings in Dalj, Erdut, Lovas, Tovarnik and Vukovar.

In the weeks before his arrest, Hadžić disappeared from his home in Novi Sad, Serbia. In 2005, Serbian media reported he might be hiding in a Serbian Orthodox monastery in Irig or in Bijela, Montenegro. Nenad Čanak, the leader of the League of Social Democrats of Vojvodina, claimed in 2006 that Hadžić was hiding in a monastery somewhere on Fruška mountain. At one point he was also rumoured to be hiding in Belarus.

In October 2007, the Serbian government council for national security had offered €250,000 for information leading to Hadžić's arrest. In 2010, the Rewards for Justice Program was offering an award of up to US$5 million for information leading to Hadžić's arrest.

In 2010, Serbia raised the reward for Hadžić's arrest to US$1.4 million. When asked by the press whether Hadžić's trial could be transferred from the ICTY, Croatian Serb politician Milorad Pupovac indicated that Serbia should try Hadžić.

Serbian police raided Hadžić's home on 9 October 2009 and impounded some of his belongings but did not make any statements following the operation.

In 2010, the Council of the European Union blocked Hadžić's family from entering the EU. After the arrest and extradition of the penultimate war-crimes fugitive, Ratko Mladić, the European Union continued to insist on the arrest and extradition of Hadžić to the Hague to face trial. And stated that his fugitive status was holding back Serbia's membership in that body

=== Arrest ===
On 20 July 2011, Serbian President Boris Tadić announced that Hadžić had been arrested by Serbian authorities. He added that the arrest closed a "difficult chapter" in Serb history.

Police located him near the village of Krušedol on the slopes of Fruška Gora at 20:24, where he was presumed to have been since he went into hiding following the ICTY indictment.

A stolen Modigliani painting led investigators to discover his whereabouts. Looking to cash in on the portrait, Hadžić was tracked down by authorities after trying to sell it.

At the time of his arrest he was the last remaining fugitive indicted by the ICTY. He was taken into custody in the Fruška Gora, and had his extradition hearing in Belgrade before a Special Court, which found that all of the prerequisites for extradition to the Hague had been met. He did not appeal his extradition.

Reaction

With the arrest, one of the obstacles to Serbia's entry into the EU was removed, and the country thus, according to the New York Times, "completed its obligations to the United Nations tribunal". EU leaders congratulated Serbia for his arrest and called it a signal of Serbia's commitment to "a better European future."

The Netherlands' Foreign Minister Uri Rosenthal said of the arrest that "it is of course another good step that has been taken. After Mladić was arrested, we said to the Serbs: now it is really down to you making that last step and catching Hadžić [to further EU succession]. And that has now happened. That involves human rights, tackling corruption and fraud, getting the economy in order and not least, co-operation with the Yugoslavia tribunal. That last point is really happening."

Extradition

On 22 July, Justice Minister Snežana Malović announced that he had been extradited to the Hague in a small Cessna plane after being allowed visits by his sick mother, wife, son and sister in a convoy of jeeps and police cars that left the detention unit of the Serbian war crimes court in the morning and headed first to Novi Sad and then to Belgrade Nikola Tesla Airport. He arrived at Rotterdam airport after he refused to appeal his extradition orders.

The Croatian government directed its Chief Public Prosecutor's Office and the Ministry of Justice to "take all the necessary steps" to bring Hadžić to a war crimes trial in the country to face other "serious crimes" they claimed that had been committed in Croatia. The government of Croatia was said to have wanted to ensure that Hadžić serve the two prison sentences previously ordered in absentia by Croatian courts.

=== Trial and death ===
Hadžić's initial arraignment before the ICTY was on 25 July and lasted 15 minutes. He declined to enter a plea to charges arising from the war in Croatia. His duty counsel Vladimir Petrovic said Hadžić would not "enter a plea today. He is going to avail himself of the rights granted to him..."

Hadžić pleaded not guilty at his second appearance before the tribunal on 24 August. The prosecutors announced they would call 141 witnesses, seven of them experts whose reports would be submitted later. Also announced was testimony from 82 fact witnesses, 20 of whom would give evidence in court. Transcripts of testimonials from the remaining 62 would be submitted into evidence, and the defense would have the opportunity to cross-examine the witnesses later.

Prosecutors received a total of 185 hours to examine the witnesses and experts-in-chief. The trial began on 16 October 2012. The prosecution completed its case in November 2013, and in February 2014 the tribunal rejected Hadžić's mid-trial motion for acquittal. Hadžić had argued that the prosecutor had produced insufficient evidence to convict. Hadžić was then required to put on his defense.

Hadžić was diagnosed with terminal brain cancer in November 2014. His trial was suspended in October 2014 as he was unable to take part due to the side effects of his treatment, which included chemotherapy. The prosecution wanted the trial to proceed in his absence but no decision was made. In April 2015 the court ordered Hadžić's provisional release, and he was sent back to Serbia. Hadžić died of his cancer the following year on 12 July 2016, aged 57.
