= Florence Hartmann =

French journalist and author (born 1963)

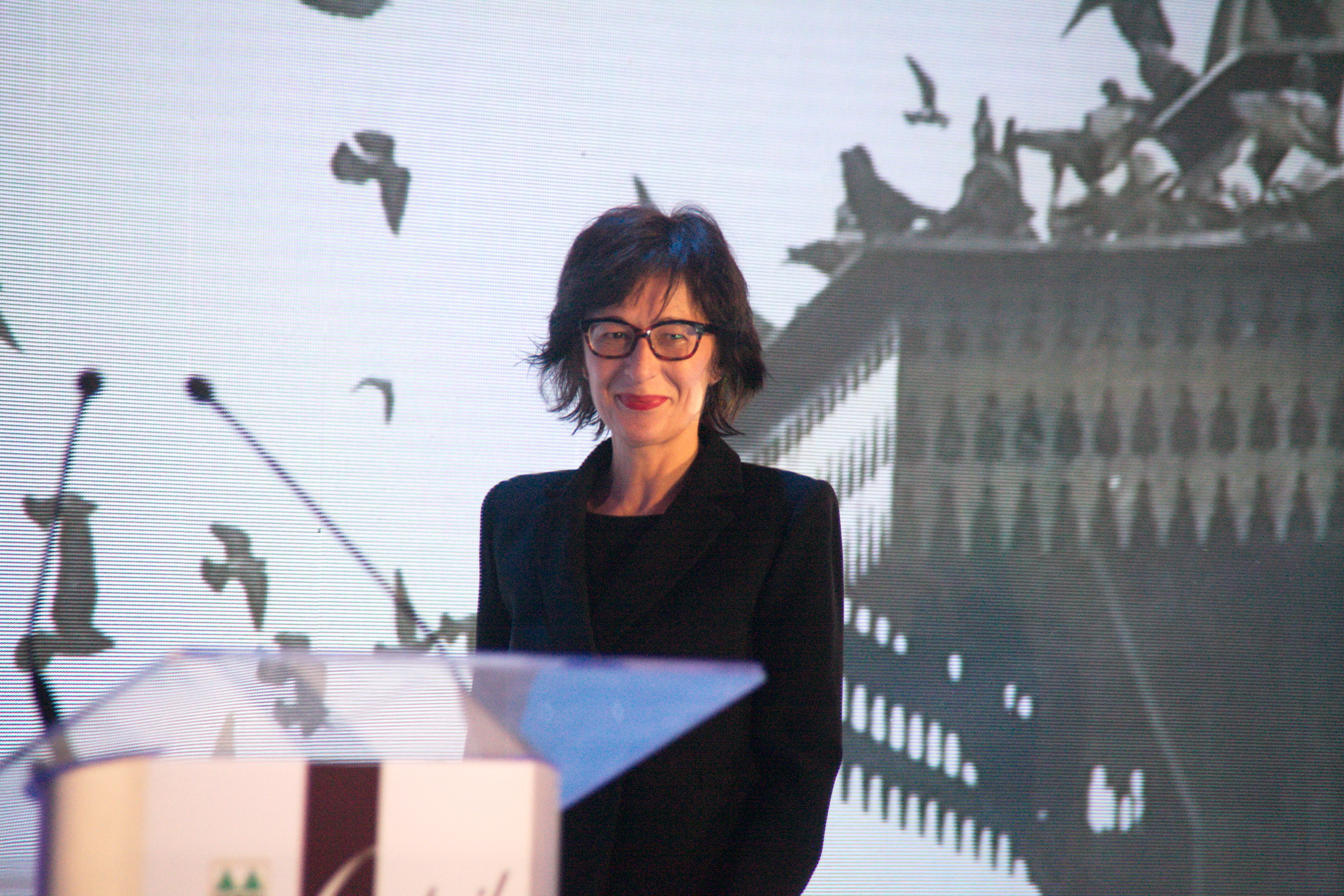
- Ceremony of recognition as a "Honorific Citizen of Sarajevo", in 2015
- Born: 17 February 1963 (age 63); France
- Occupations: Journalist, writer, activist, spokesperson for ICTY
- Awards: Honorific Citizen of Sarajevo

Florence Hartmann (born 17 February 1963) is a French journalist and author. During the 1990s she was a correspondent in the Balkans for the French newspaper Le Monde. In 1999 she published her first book, Milosevic, la diagonale du fou (Milosevic, the opposite of crazy), reissued by Gallimard in 2002. From October 2000 until October 2006 she was official spokesperson and Balkan adviser to Carla Del Ponte, chief prosecutor of the International Criminal Tribunal for the former Yugoslavia (ICTY) in The Hague.

On 19 July 2011, the Appeals Chamber of the ICTY upheld the first instance decision to convict Hartmann of contempt of court for the section of text called "Vital genocide documents concealed" in her book, Paix et Châtiment, les guerres secrètes de la politique et de la justice internationales, which included the "legal reasoning" of two confidential appellate rulings of the UN Tribunal approving black-outs and exclusions from critical historical war documents showing Serbia's involvement in the Bosnian war of the 1990s. She was fined €7,000 (£6,100). The fine was later converted into a seven-day prison sentence, for which the ICTY issued an arrest warrant. In December 2011, France refused to extradite her. In March 2016, Hartmann was arrested while reporting at the tribunal building, and forced to serve out her sentence.

== Career ==
Hartmann worked for eleven years for the French daily Le Monde as a journalist in charge of the Balkan desk. From January 1990 until May 1994, she was Le Monde correspondent for the former Yugoslavia. In 1999 she published her first book, Milosevic, la diagonale du fou (later reissued by Gallimard in 2002). From October 2000 until October 2006, Hartmann was official spokesperson and Balkan adviser to Carla Del Ponte, chief prosecutor of the ICTY at The Hague. Her book, Paix et châtiment, Les guerres secrètes de la politique et de la justice internationales, regarding the politics of international justice and her version of how the ICTY and the ICTR functioned, was published by Parisian publisher Groupe Flammarion in September 2007.

In 2014, she published a book on whistleblowers, Lanceurs d'alerte, les mauvaises consciences de nos démocraties (published by Donquichotte Editions). In July 2015, she issued a book that reveals the role of the west in the runup to Srebrenica's fall, The Srebrenica Affair: The Blood of Realpolitik,

She was the first journalist to discover in October 1992 the existence and location of a mass grave at Ovčara (Croatia) containing the remains of 263 people who were taken from Vukovar's hospital to a nearby farm and killed on 20 November 1991 by Serb forces. On 25 May 2006, she gave evidence before the ICTY in the "Vukovar massacre case" against three Yugoslav People's Army (JNA) officers -- Mile Mrkšić, Miroslav Radić and Veselin Šljivančanin—who had been indicted in relation to the Ovčara incident.

On 10 December 2011, Hartmann was given a lifetime achievement award for her contribution to the protection and promotion of human rights by the Croatian Helsinki Committee for Human Rights.

== Contempt of Court in the ICTY ==
On 27 August 2008, Hartmann was indicted by the Tribunal for disclosing, in her book, Paix et châtiment, Les guerres secrètes de la politique et de la justice internationales, confidential information pertaining to two decisions of the Tribunal approving blackouts and exclusions from critical historical war documents provided by Belgrade for the trial of the former Serbian President Slobodan Milošević and showing Serbia's involvement in the Srebrenica massacre.

Hartmann posited that the ICTY Appeals Chamber had used invalid legal reasoning to effectively censor evidence which might have implicated Serbia-Montenegro in the alleged commission of genocide in Bosnia and Herzegovina during the 1990s Balkans wars. She specifically criticized the ICTY Appeals Chamber for improperly denying victims of mass atrocities the ability to access information critical to their ability to obtain reparations for crimes committed against them and their relatives. She argued that the war documents censored by the ICTY should have been made available during a separate trial at the International Court of Justice (ICJ) in which Bosnia unsuccessfully tried to sue Serbia for genocide, because they could not prove a direct link between Belgrade and war crimes committed in Bosnia – most notably the massacre of up to 8,000 Bosniak men and boys around Srebrenica in 1995.

The Tribunal decision to grant confidentiality for the key portions of Belgrade war documents acknowledged that disclosure would harm Serbia's "vital national interests" by failing to protect Serbia from having to pay damages to Bosnia in Bosnia's suit then-pending at the ICJ.

The issue at trial was whether the information she disclosed – "the existence and the purported effect" of the two impugned confidential decisions of the ICTY Appeals Chamber's dated 20 September 2005 and 6 April 2006 – was confidential or whether only the key evidence Serbia sought to censor was protected by a Court order.

On 14 September 2009, the ICTY found Hartmann guilty of contempt of court and was sentenced to pay a €7,000 (£6,100) fine for disclosing information relating to the two confidential ICTY Court orders that deprive victims and public from access to documents on Serbia's involvement in planning and executing the Srebrenica genocide in 1995. While the Chamber found that "some protected information disclosed by the Accused in her publications was indeed in the public domain", it considered that she disclosed "more information, notably the legal reasoning applied by the Appeals Chamber in reaching its dispositions, as well as the purported effects of both Appeals Chamber decisions".

She was convicted on these grounds of violating two appellate orders dated 20 September 2005 and 6 April 2006 issued in the Slobodan Milosević case before the ICTY.

On 24 September 2009, Hartmann launched an appeal against the conviction. The London-based international NGO called Article 19, which is dedicated to the protection and promotion of freedom of speech submitted an amicus curiae brief, calling the ICTY Appeals Chamber to apply the international standards allegedly disregarded by the Trial Chamber.

On 19 July 2011, the ICTY Appeals Chamber dismissed all the grounds of appeal advanced by Hartmann and confirmed the conviction, limiting it exclusively to the "disclosure of the legal reasoning of the two impugned confidential decisions". The imposition of the €7,000 fine was upheld.

In March 2011, prior to the issuing of the appeal judgement against Hartmann, the impugned confidential decisions criticized by Hartmann were turned down. Most of the critical documents provided by Belgrade for the trial of Slobodan Milosević in relation to which confidentiality orders had initially been made were released by the ICTY and admitted as public evidence in the ICTY case against Momčilo Perišić, former Yugoslav Army chief of staff. The only information pertaining to the 2005 and 2006 confidentiality Court orders that still remains protected is therefore the Appeals Chamber's legal reasoning. However, no ban was ordered in the ICTY Appeal judgment in relation to the three impugned pages of her book or her articles.

In reaction to Hartmann's conviction by the ICTY, several international NGOs have criticized the ICTY for hiding its "legal reasoning" while the publicity of criminal proceedings is a general principle of criminal and international law which aim is to guarantee the transparency and public control of judicial proceedings. Reporters Without Borders and Article 19 condemned a conviction contravening international case law relating to freedom of expression.

Reporters Without Borders stated that "it is the duty of the press to highlight how this internationally created system of justice works, to question its procedures and to stimulate public discussion". "Article 19 believes that such an insistence on keeping the logic and effect of the ICTY's jurisprudence secret is profoundly undemocratic and manifestly inappropriate for an international criminal court", adding that "[t]o impose such a penalty on a journalist for bringing transparency and accountability to the ICTY raises troubling questions about the Tribunal's democratic legitimacy".

The €7,000 fine was deposited by Hartmann into a French dedicated bank account along with an invitation to the ICTY to seek assistance to the French authorities in order to collect these funds for the purposes of paying the fine. The ICTY Appeals Chamber deemed the money not to have been paid and converted, on 16 November 2011, the €7,000 fine into a seven-day prison term. An arrest warrant for contempt of court was issued by the ICTY on the same day, ordering France to transfer immediately Hartmann to The Hague and the Netherlands to assist in taking her to the United Nations detention unit. The French government refused to extradite Hartmann and informed the ICTY of this refusal on 27 December 2011.

In November 2011, Reporters Without Borders urged the French judiciary to determine the validity of the arrest warrant and to consider the merits of the case in accordance with the case law of the European Court of Human Rights. "The European Court of Human Rights has consistently emphasized the public interest in the reporting of legal issues. It would be illogical and dangerous if international justice was exempt."

On 30 November 2011, Article 19 denounced the unlawfulness of the arrest warrant and "calls on all states, particularly the French and Dutch authorities, to avoid complicity in this perversion of international justice and to resist carrying out the order". Article 19 insisted that the human rights guarantees enshrined in the European Convention on Human Rights (ECHR) should take priority over the ICTY and recalled that under the case law of the European Court of Human Rights, French authorities as well as the authorities of the 46 other member states to the European Convention are obliged to verify the legality of the ICTY orders which they are asked to execute.

Hartmann began petitioning Frank La Rue, United Nations Special Rapporteur for Freedom of Opinion and Expression, and Dunja Mijatović, the Representative for Freedom of the Media of the Organization for Security and Co-operation in Europe (OSCE), on 30 November. As there is no appeal before an independent jurisdiction from a decision of the ICTY, Hartmann is seeking from the Special Rapporteurs a judgement that the ICTY decision against her violates international standards of protection of the right of freedom of expression and that upholding or executing the arrest warrant against her would constitute a further violation of this right. Reporters Without Borders called on both rapporteurs to remind international courts that they are subject to international norms, especially those concerning freedom of expression, noting that "[b]eyond the Hartmann case itself, the decision to penalize criticism of an international tribunal is a dangerous precedent for all those working in the media."

On 24 March 2016, Hartmann was arrested by UN guards as she gave an interview near the war crimes tribunal building. She was granted early release on 29 March 2016.

== The Srebrenica Affair ==
The book L'affaire Srebrenica: Le Sang De La Realpolitik (The Srebrenica Affair: The Blood of Realpolitik) by Hartmann, was published by Éditions Don Quichotte, Paris, on 7 July 2015." The book is an analysis of events leading to the fall of Srebrenica.
