= Vukovar Hospital =

Hospital in Croatia

Vukovarska bolnica
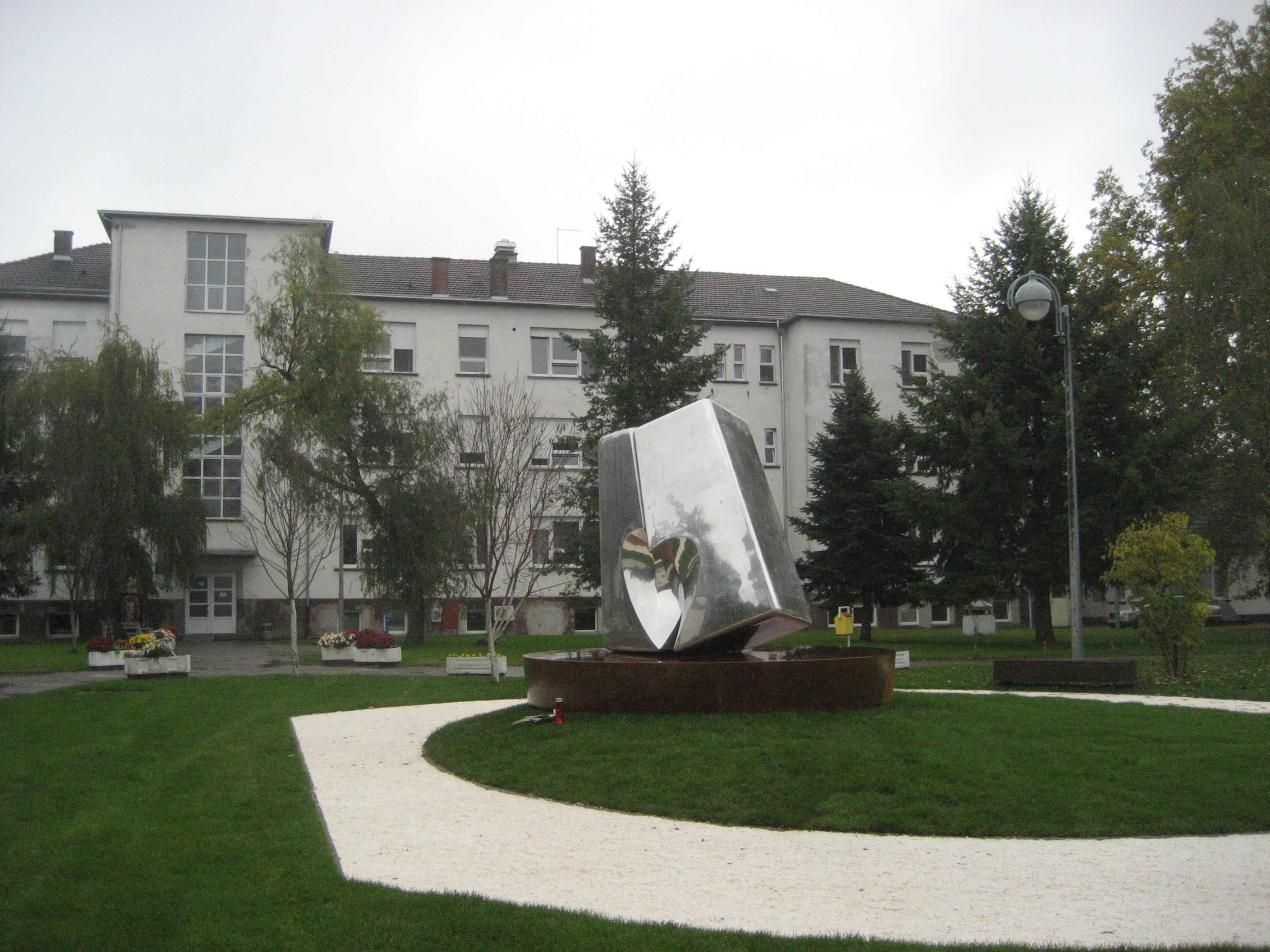
- Vukovar Hospital

Geography
- Location: Vukovar, Croatia
- Coordinates: 45.35806°N 18.99417°E

Organisation
- Care system: HZZO
- Funding: Public hospital
- Type: District general

Services
- Emergency department: Yes

History
- Opened: 1939

Links
- Website: ob-vukovar.hr
- Lists: Hospitals in Croatia

The "Dr Juraj Njavro" National Memorial Hospital (Croatian: Nacionalna memorijalna bolnica „dr. Juraj Njavro” Vukovar), commonly known as the Vukovar Hospital (Croatian: Vukovarska bolnica, Serbian Cyrillic: Вуковарска болница), is a public hospital in Vukovar in eastern Croatia. It is the primary hospital in the town of Vukovar and surrounding municipalities which together with hospitals in Vinkovci and Osijek covers the region of eastern Slavonia.

The hospital gained national prominence in 1991 during and at the end of the Battle of Vukovar when 93 of its patients became victims of the Vukovar massacre. International Criminal Tribunal for the former Yugoslavia convicted on a war crimes indictment Veselin Šljivančanin and Mile Mrkšić in Vukovar Hospital case while Miroslav Radić was released after being acquitted.

Vesna Bosanac (1949–2022) was the director of the hospital during the war, and later after the peaceful reintegration following the Erdut Agreement.

== See also ==
- List of hospitals in Croatia
