= Stanev =

Stanev (Bulgarian: Станев, female form Staneva (Станева); also appearing in the German transliteration variant Stanew) is a Bulgarian, Ukrainian and Russian surname which is derived either from Stan or Stane – both diminutives of the male given name Stanislav (with the meaning "to become glorious") – by adding the east Slavic patronymic suffix -ев (-ev). Notable people with the surname include:

- Emiliyan Stanev (1907–1979), pseudonym of Bulgarian prose writer Nikola Stoyanov Stanev
- Evgeny Stanev (born 1979), Russian judoka
- Ivan Stanev (born 1959), Bulgarian-born German author, theatre and film director
- Mladen Stanev (born 1974), Bulgarian conductor
- Pavel Stanev (born 1986), Bulgarian football goalkeeper
- Petar Stanev (born 1975), former Bulgarian footballer
- Radostin Stanev (born 1975), former Bulgarian footballer
- Rumen Stanev (born 1973), Bulgarian Roman Catholic bishop
- Sergey Stanev (born 1988), Bulgarian footballer of Ukrainian descent
- Vesselin Stanev (born 1964), Bulgarian pianist
