= Alfred Krupa =

Yugoslavian painter, inventor and sportsman (1915–1989)

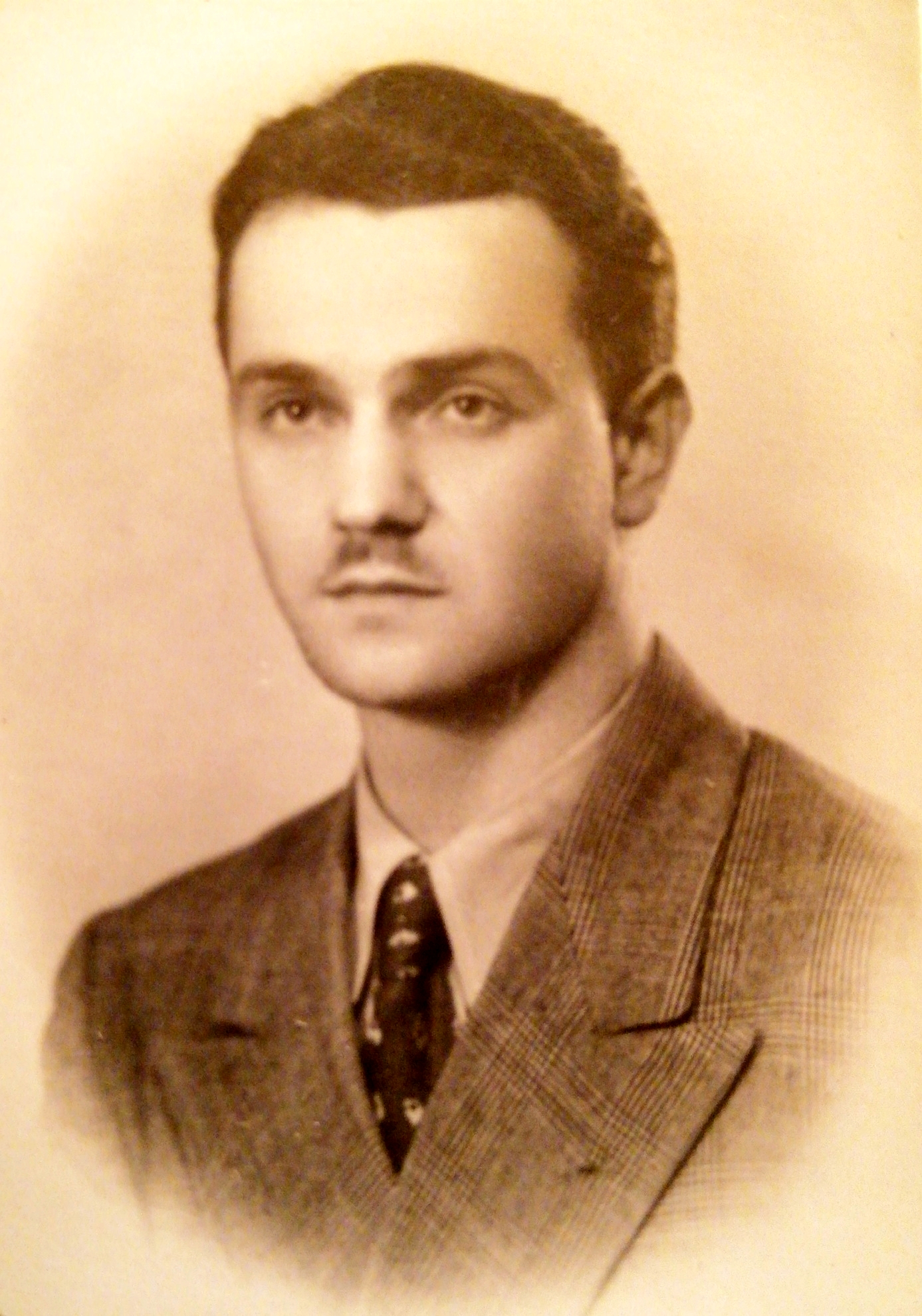
- Alfred Krupa
- Born: Alfred Joseph Krūppa; July 22, 1915; Mikołów, Poland
- Died: 16 October 1989 (aged 74); Karlovac, Croatia, Yugoslavia
- Education: Academy of Fine Arts in Kraków, Academy of Fine Arts in Zagreb
- Known for: Painting, drawing, inventions, art and sport education
- Spouse: Štefica Krupa (b. Ožbolt)

Alfred Krupa (born Alfred Joseph Krūppa; 22 July 1915 – 16 October 1989) was a Polish-born Yugoslavian and Croatian academic painter, inventor, sportsman and art teacher. Born in Poland, he has lived in Croatia, Yugoslavia since 1943.

== Early life ==
Krupa was born on 22 July 1915 in Mikołów in the German Empire (now in Poland).

== Resume ==
Krupa, the former pupil of Polish painter Józef Mehoffer in Kraków (finished his study in 1937), appears in archives of the International Tracing Service as the registered victims of Nazi persecution. He was a forced laborer deported to Germany, while his sister Hilgard Marie was burned alive at the furnace of the Auschwitz K.C. on 1 February 1944 at the age of 25. Alfred Krupa's ancestry include persons of German, Polish and Jewish origin (multiethnic Silesian family). In 1943 he has found himself in Croatia, Yugoslavia, joined resistance forces, and became one of the 13 core artists of the Art of Croatian Antifascist Movement (he exhibited at the historic first Partisan exhibition held in Topusko in 1944 on the free territory of Yugoslavia) In 1945 Alfred Krupa enrolled the Academy of Fine Arts in Zagreb (University of Zagreb) in order to formally defend and verify his academic level obtained at the academy in Kraków in 1937. He has successfully passed all examination requirements in the same year. In 1979 he inspired and cofounded the Watercolor Biennale of Yugoslavia (BAJ), at the time very respected juried exhibition.

== Comment ==
Some comments that Krupa was the first man who painted a classical oil on paper. In the summer of 1950 at Vrbnik, he hand-made a dive mask from truck tires and glass, a tube for breathing underwater, and tied himself and a painting stand to the sea bottom. Those works were exhibited in Zagreb in 1951, but have subsequently been lost. For that, his critics attacked him for being ‘too bizarre’ (ref. Interesting Engineering (website).

== Literature ==
- Encyclopedia of Fine Arts (1964) Yugoslav Lexicographic Institute-Zagreb, vol. 3, p. 256
- Encyclopedia of Fine Arts (1987) Yugoslav Lexicographic Institute-Zagreb, vol. 2, p. 146
- Croatian Encyclopedia of Fine Arts (2004), Lexicographic Institute Miroslav Krleža, vol. 4, p. 46
- Journal of Contemporary History (1976) Institute for Contemporary History, vol. 8 p. 140
- Mihajlo Ogrizović (1960), Educational and cultural work with adults in Croatia during the national liberation war Alliance of 'People's Universities' of Croatia, p. 106
- Nada Šuica, Idris Čejvan, Drawings, Graphics and Watercolors from the National Liberation War (1963)
- Edo Kovačević (1965) Visual Arts of the National Revolution, Museum of the Croatian People's Revolution
- Vesna Jiroušek (1958) 20th Century Watercolor in Croatia, Yugoslav Academy of Sciences and Arts
- Mladen Iveković, Vjekoslav Bratulić (1970) Croatian Left Intelligence 1918–1945, Naprijed, p. 177
- Karlovac Lexicon (2008) Školska knjiga and Edicija Leksikon, p. 241
- Željko Sabol: Krupa, Alfred, Encyclopedia of Croatian Art, vol. 1, Zagreb, 1995, p. 488
- Juraj Baldani: Chopin of Croatian Painting (exhibition catalog), Ulrich Gallery, Zagreb, April 4–24, 1996
- Željko Marcijuš: Krupine romantične bilješke, in: Festival akvarela Hrvatske (exhibition catalog), Split, 1997
