= Slavko Dokmanović =

Croatian Serb charged with grave breaches of the Geneva Conventions

- Славко Докмановић
- Dokmanović at the ICTY

Mayor of Vukovar
- In office May 1990 – May 1991
- Succeeded by: Marin Vidić

President of the Coordinating Committee of Eastern Slavonia, Baranja and Western Syrmia
- In office 7 August 1995 – 22 April 1996
- Preceded by: Position established
- Succeeded by: Goran Hadžić

Minister of Agriculture of SAO Eastern Slavonia, Baranja and Western Syrmia
- In office 25 September 1991 – 19 December 1991
- Preceded by: Veljko Stoisavljević
- Succeeded by: Veljko Stoisavljević

Personal details
- Born: Slavko Dokmanović; December 14, 1949 Trpinja, PR Croatia, FPR Yugoslavia (modern Croatia)
- Died: June 29, 1998 (aged 48) The Hague, Netherlands
- Cause of death: Suicide by hanging
- Party: League of Communists of Croatia

Slavko Dokmanović (Serbian Cyrillic: Славко Докмановић; 14 December 1949 – 29 June 1998) was a Serbian politician who was charged with grave breaches of the Geneva Conventions, violation of the customs of war and crimes against humanity by the International Criminal Tribunal for the Former Yugoslavia (ICTY) for his actions in the Vukovar massacre while he served as the city's mayor. He was indicted for murder, willful killing, willfully causing great suffering, cruel treatment, and inhumane acts.

Dokmanović faced two charges of each count. He was arrested in 1997 by the Polish special forces GROM and pleaded not guilty to all charges. However, he died on 29 June 1998, having hanged himself in his cell, and his trial's proceedings soon stopped without a verdict. He was indicted along with Mile Mrkšić, Veselin Šljivančanin and Miroslav Radić, who were all on trial for their alleged role in the massacre.

== See also ==
- Battle of Vukovar
- Croatian War of Independence
