= Milorad Lemić =

Serbian politician (born 1948)

Milorad Lemić (Serbian Cyrillic: Милорад Лемић; born 19 July 1948) is a Serbian politician. He served in the Assembly of Vojvodina from 2016 to 2020. For many years a member of the far-right Serbian Radical Party, Lemić joined the Serbian Progressive Party in 2013.

== Private career ==
Lemić is a graduated economist. He lives in Temerin, Vojvodina.

== Politician ==
=== Republika Srpska Krajina and after ===
Lemić lived in Beli Manastir, in the SAO Eastern Slavonia, Baranja and Western Syrmia of the self-proclaimed Republika Srpska Krajina (RSK), during the Croatian War of the 1990s. He participated in the RSK's assembly as a Radical Party delegate. Lemić relocated to the Republic of Serbia after the war, settling in Temerin.

He was Radical Party candidate in the 2000 Serbian parliamentary election, receiving the 213th position on the party's electoral list. The party won twenty-three seats, and he was not selected for a mandate. (From 2000 to 2011, mandates in Serbian elections determined by proportional representation were awarded to successful parties or coalitions rather than individual candidates, and it was common practice for the mandates to be assigned out of numerical order. Lemić could have been awarded a mandate despite his low position on the list, although he was not.)

=== Municipal politics ===
Lemić was a member of Temerin's municipal council (i.e., the executive branch of the municipal government) in the 2004–08 term. He later appeared on the Radical Party's list for Temerin in the 2008 Serbian local elections and was selected for a mandate in the municipal assembly after the list won a plurality victory with eleven of thirty-three mandates.

The Radical Party experienced a serious split later in 2008, with several members joining the more moderate Progressive Party under the leadership of Tomislav Nikolić and Aleksandar Vučić. Lemić initially chose to remain with the Radicals.

Serbia's electoral system was reformed in 2011, such that mandates were awarded to candidates on successful lists in numerical order. Lemić was given the fourth position on the Radical Party's list for Temerin in the 2012 local elections and was re-elected when the list won exactly four mandates. In mid-2013, he and another Radical delegate in the local assembly left the party and joined the Progressives. Lemić did not seek re-election at the local level in 2016.

=== Assembly of Vojvodina ===
Lemić received the fifty-fourth position on the Progressive Party's list in the 2016 Vojvodina provincial election and was elected when the list won a majority victory with sixty-three out of 120 mandates. He served as a government supporter for the next four years and did not seek re-election in 2020.
