= Iveković =

Iveković (pronounced [iʋěːkoʋitɕ]) is a Croatian surname. Etymologically it is derived from the name Ìvek, by means of possessive suffix -ov and patronymic-forming suffix -ić. The name Ivek is Kajkavian hypocoristic variety of the name Ìvan. It is chiefly distributed in the region of Zagorje.

It may refer to:

- Franjo Iveković (1834–1914), Croatian linguist and religious writer
- Mladen Iveković (1903–1970), Croatian politician
- Oton Iveković (1869–1939), Croatian painter
- Rada Iveković (born 1945), Croatian philosopher, Indologist, writer and a university professor
- Sanja Iveković (born 1949), Croatian artist
