= Doctor's Tower =

- Interactive map of the Doctor's Tower area

General information
- Type: monument
- Classification: Cultural monument of great importance
- Location: Savski venac, Belgrade, Serbia
- Coordinates: 44.8°N 20.45°E
- Completed: 1824

The Doctor's Tower (Serbian: Докторова кула, Doktorova kula) is a tower in Belgrade, the capital of Serbia that is a historic former doctors residence and then psychiatric clinic. It is located at 103 Kneza Miloša street, in the municipality of Savski venac. The tower was built in 1824 by the Italian doctor Vito Romita, one of the first doctors in Serbia after the uprisings. In 1965, the tower was protected by law as an important cultural monument.

Doctor's Tower was the first psychiatric hospital in Serbia and the Balkans.

== Background ==
With the establishment of partial state independence of the Principality of Serbia by Edicts of 1829, 1830, and 1833, conditions were created for the formation of the first government administrative and legislative institutions, the establishment of the National Assembly, ministries and judicial authorities, organizing the police and the national army, and the restoration of churches and monasteries. This process involved both the restoration and construction of many buildings needed for accommodation. These buildings were concentrated in the larger cities: Kragujevac, the capital at the time, as well as in Belgrade, Požarevac and Šabac. In addition to representative castles, various buildings were erected for storing the state administration, the military, medical, educational, cultural, traffic and other institutions such as customs office, barracks, hospitals, schools, tavern, menzulanas, and the first industrial plants.

The first period of modernization of the state and the establishment of state and social institutions (1830-1839) was burdened with numerous difficulties. Areas, where improvements were necessary, were health care of the population and the army. There were no civil hospitals, and treatment of the population was carried out by semi-skilled, self-taught, so-called herbalists, healers, and wound healers as well as Turkish hodzas, Jewish healers and travelling Greek doctors from Epirus. In Belgrade, Hećim Toma Kostić who held an inn in the city, across from the Serbian church (now tavern ? (bistro)) was very well-known. Drugs were acquired from Turkey or Austria and were sold in the shops. In the early twenties, a doctor by the name of Konstantin Aleksandridi was in the service of Prince Miloš Obrenović.

As of 1822, Vito Romita, a senior and respected Neapolitan, was the Prince's personal doctor. He was a self-taught doctor from the south of Italy, who served in Istanbul and Bucharest, and was the personal doctor of the Belgrade Vizier prior to 1823.

== History ==
Romita received the land of about 6.5 hectares from the vizier, far beyond the fortified city, on the slopes of West Vračar, in the neighbourhood of Guberevac. After coming to the prince's service, he built his house here, surrounded by a vegetable garden, orchard and vineyard, with plants sent from Italy. The purpose of the house was double - for housing and receiving patients. Since it has a façade of stone and small window shafts, the people called it the Doctor's Tower.

The Doctor's Tower was also known as Cunibert Tower after Romita's son-in-law, to whom he left the tower with the vineyard. as a dowry. Like Romita, his son-in-law Bartolomeo Silvestro Cunibert was also doctor. At one time doctor to Prince Miloš and his family, he was also the first doctor of the surroundings and the city of Belgrade, by the Prince's order. He also founded the first pharmacy in Belgrade in 1827 and the family remained in the house until 1851.

After Romita's death in 1835, his son-in-law Cunibert inherited the house, but his family could not afford to maintain the building so they sold it to Prince Miloš. His son, Prince Mihailo Obrenović then inherited it from him and gave it a medical purpose. It was specifically defined as a "Home for the Mentally Challenged" (Dom za s uma sišavše) on 3 March 1861 in the special law. The hospital becoming the backbone of the future clinical center, which is now located around it. The first patient was admitted on 26 August 1861, and in 1881 it grew into a hospital for mental illness. The managers of the hospital in the first thirty years of work were: Dr. Florian Birg, Dr. Vasa Todorović, Dr. Mladen Janković, Dr. Đorđe Ilinkovski, Dr. Jovan Danić, and Dr. Milan Vasić. The most significant psychiatrist of the hospital was Dr. Laza Lazarević.

The oldest today preserved anamnesis is from 1880, about the time when Lazarević began to work in the hospital.

== Appearance ==
The house of Vito Romita, the Doctor's Tower, is square in shape, with walls of rough stone. It was built of brick, stone and hollow tiles, and it consists of a basement, ground floor and first floor, with a symmetrical room layout. The interior is rich in decoration, especially the ceiling, and all the woodwork is made of solid wood. Oriental influence is seen in the pointed top of the front door, and it is typically Central European when it comes to the room height. From reduced decorative plastic, the motif of the pointed arch stands out, applied to openings in the storey zone, which represents the influence of romantic architecture. Representatively processed kilns were preserved in the interior of the building, and they are representative of applied art of the time. According to its stylistic and structural characteristics, the Doctor's Tower represents material evidence of the architecture of its time and is one of the first representative buildings built in Serbia in the first half of the nineteenth century. As one of the first buildings used for health purposes, it is a testimony to the social development of the Principality of Serbia. Due to this, the Doctor's Tower was declared a cultural monument of great importance 5 in 1979.

== Present use ==
The house was abandoned in the 1990s and had substantially deteriorated by the 2010s. At that time, the idea was announced of adapting the house into a facility for the children, and their parents undergoing cancer therapies in the nearby Radiology Hospital. Funds were acquired but as of 2017 the house has not been renovated and other suggestions such as turning it into a museum or returning the building to its original psychiatric use, were proposed.

== See more ==
- Cultural Heritage of Serbia
- Cultural Monuments of Great Importance (Serbia)
