= Banović =

Banović is a Serbian, Croatian and in rare cases Montenegrin surname.

- Boris Banović, Croatian fashion designer
- Igor Banović (born 1987), Croatian footballer
- Ivan Banović (born 1984), Croatian footballer
- Ivica Banović (born 1980), Croatian footballer
- Marko Banović (born 1967), Croatian rower
- Mladen Banović, Croatian engineer
- Patrik Banovič (born 1991), Slovak footballer
- Predrag Banović (born 1969), Bosnian Serb war criminal
- Petra Banović (born 1979), Croatian swimmer
- Strahinja Banović (died 1389), Medieval Serb hero
- Yakka Banovic (born 1956), Australian footballer of Croatian descent
- Zoran Banović (born 1977), Montenegrin footballer

== See also ==
- Banovići, town in Bosnia and Herzegovina
