= Mladenović =

Mladenović (meaning "Son of Mladen") is a surname often found in Serbia and Croatia. It may refer to:

- Branko Mladenović, 14th century Serbian feudal lord, founder of the House of Branković
- Dragan Mladenović :
  - Dragan Mladenović (born 1956), Yugoslav handballer
  - Dragan Mladenović (born 1963), Yugoslav handballer, Kristina Mladenovic's father
  - Dragan Mladenović (born 1976), Serbian footballer
- Filip Mladenović (born 1991), Serbian footballer
- Kristina Mladenovic (born 1993), French tennis player
- Milan Mladenović (1958–1994), Serbian musician
- Mladen Mladenović (born 1964), Croatian footballer
- Nenad Mladenović (born 1976), Serbian footballer
- Zdravko Mladenović (born 1977), Serbian politician and teacher
