= Mladenov =

Mladenov (Bulgarian: Младенов), feminine Mladenova (Bulgarian: Младенова) is a Bulgarian surname derived from the first name Mladen. It may refer to:

- Aleksandar Mladenov (born 1982), Bulgarian footballer
- Atanas Mladenov (born 1960), Bulgarian high jumper
- Daniel Mladenov (born 1987), Bulgarian footballer
- Dessislava Mladenova (born 1988), Bulgarian tennis player
- Dimitar Mladenov (born 1962), Bulgarian footballer
- Georgi Mladenov (born 1962), Bulgarian basketball player and coach
- Hristo Mladenov (1928–1996), Bulgarian footballer
- Ivaylo Mladenov (born 1973), Bulgarian long jumper
- Lazar Mladenov (1854–1918), Bulgarian priest
- Mladen Mladenov (wrestler) (born 1957), Bulgarian wrestler
- Nedyalko Mladenov (born 1961), Bulgarian footballer
- Nickolay Mladenov (born 1972), Bulgarian politician and diplomat
- Nikola Mladenov (1964–2013), Macedonian journalist
- Petar Mladenov (1936–2000), Bulgarian politician and head of state
- Stefan Mladenov (1880–1963), Bulgarian linguist
- Stoian Mladenov, Bulgarian footballer
- Stoycho Mladenov (born 1957), Bulgarian footballer
- Stoycho Mladenov Jr. (born 1985), Bulgarian footballer
- Vasko Mladenov (born 1989), Bulgarian tennis player
- Yuri Mladenov (born 1977), Bulgarian boxer
