= Kozarac, Sisak-Moslavina County =

Kozarac Козарац (Serbian)
- Village
- Location of Kozarac in Croatia
- Coordinates: 45°21′58″N 15°54′19″E
- Country: Croatia
- Region: Continental Croatia
- County: Sisak-Moslavina County
- Municipality: Gvozd

Area
  - Total: 10.1 km^{2} (3.9 sq mi)
  - Land: 9.90 km^{2} (3.82 sq mi)
- Elevation: 186 m (610 ft)

Population (2021)
  - Total: 90
  - Density: 9.1/km^{2} (24/sq mi)
- Time zone: UTC+1 (CET)
  - Summer (DST): UTC+2 (CEST)
- Postal code: 44410
- Area code: (+385) 44

Kozarac (Serbian Cyrillic: Козарац) is a village in central Croatia, in the municipality of Gvozd, Sisak-Moslavina County. It is connected by the D6 highway.

== History ==
The municipality of Gvozd, within which Kozarac is situated, lies in the historical Kordun region of central Croatia, an area with a large ethnic Serb population. During the Croatian War of Independence (1991–1995), the broader Krajina region including the Kordun area came under the control of separatist ethnic Serbs who established the self-proclaimed Republic of Serbian Krajina (RSK). On 4 August 1995, the Croatian Army launched Operation Storm, a military offensive to retake the territory then held by the RSK. The operation brought Croatian government control back to the area, though it also led to the displacement of a large number of ethnic Serbs from the region.

== Demographics ==
According to the 2011 census, the village of Kozarac has 122 inhabitants. This represents 41.93% of its pre-war population according to the 1991 census.

According to the 1991 census, 93.82% of the village population were ethnic Serbs (273/291), 0.34% were ethnic Croats (1/291), 0.34% were Yugoslavs (1/291), while 5.50% were of other ethnic origin (16/291).

Population change 1857-2011
v

population	358	385	407	470	473	471	472	563	412	476	441	347	338	291	166	122
	1857	1869	1880	1890	1900	1910	1921	1931	1948	1953	1961	1971	1981	1991	2001	2011

Sources: Croatian Bureau of Statistics publications

== Notable natives and residents ==
- Mile Mrkšić (1 May 1947 – 16 August 2015), born in Kozarac, was a colonel in the Yugoslav People's Army (JNA) who commanded the unit involved in the Battle of Vukovar during the Croatian War of Independence. He was convicted by the International Criminal Tribunal for the former Yugoslavia (ICTY) of aiding and abetting the murder, torture and cruel treatment of prisoners at the Ovčara farm near Vukovar in November 1991, and was sentenced to 20 years' imprisonment. After the fall of Vukovar, Mrkšić was promoted to the rank of general in the JNA. He was transferred to Portugal to serve his sentence in August 2012, and died on 16 August 2015 while still imprisoned.
