= Bartolomeo Silvestro Cunibert =

Serbian physician

Bartolomeo Cunibert or Bartolomeo Kunibert (Italian: Bartolomeo Silvestro Cuniberti; Savigliano, Kingdom of Piedmont-Sardinia 3 December 1800 - Savigliano, Kingdom of Piedmont-Sardinia, 3 March 1851) was a Piedmontese doctor of medicine in Serbia from 1828 to 1839. He was the personal physician of the Principality of Serbia's prince Miloš and his family. In 1827 with his father-in-law Vito Romita, Cunibert opened a pharmacy, and in 1832 Prince Miloš appointed him the first doctor of the district and the city of Belgrade. At the end of Miloš's first reign, he served the prince as a translator and trusted envoy to the British consul in Belgrade, George Lloyd Hodges.

After the abdication of Prince Miloš in 1839, Cunibert left Principality of Serbia and returned to Savigliano, his birthplace, where he devoted himself to writing the history of the Serbian Revolution and the rule of Prince Miloš Obrenović. Until the end of his life, he wrote and edited his work "Historical Review of the Uprisings and Independence of Serbia 1804-1850" in French, which was posthumously completed and published by his brothers Felice and Michelangelo. Cunibert's history was translated into Serbian by Milenko Vesnić under the title "Serbian Uprising and the First Rule of Miloš Obrenović 1804-1850" in 1901. The work was reissued in two volumes in 1988 by the publishing company Prosveta with a preface by Dušan T. Bataković.

According to Cunibert, cultural monument of great importance Doctor's Tower in Belgrade is sometimes called Cunibert's Tower.

== Arrival in Belgrade ==
Bartolomeo Cunibert was born on 3 December 1800 in Savigliano in the Kingdom of Piedmont. He was educated in his hometown and then attended Medical studies in Turin, specializing in Surgery. After graduating, he acquired the legal right to teach medical sciences himself. During his studies, he most likely joined Carbonari, a secret association that advocated Italian unification. He was under pressure from the police authorities in 1824. He left the Kingdom of Piedmont-Sardinia and went to Constantinople, the capital Ottoman Empire. There he met Kapujićehaja of the Belgrade pashalik who received him in the service and sent him to Belgrade where Cunibert arrived in the summer of 1824.

== In the service of Prince Miloš ==
As a physician of the Belgrade Abdurrahman Nurettin Pasha (1821-1826) Cunibert worked for a salary of a thousand groschen a month and was also entitled to an apartment, a carriage, three horses, two servants and food for themselves and their families. In Belgrade, he found Neapolitan Vito Romita, a doctor and a refugee Carbonari, who invariably served as the doctor of the Belgrade vizier and the Serbian prince Miloš. In 1823 the prince also entrusted Romita the upbringing of his daughter Savka Obrenović. Cunibert himself married Romita's daughter Antoinette in 1826. In 1827 Romita and Cunibert opened their first pharmacy in Belgrade but soon broke up. Romita went to the neighbouring Principality of Wallachia where he continued his medical and pharmacy practice, but not before he bequeathed Cunibert the Doctor's Tower with vineyard.

Before Cunibert's arrival in Belgrade, only two graduate doctors worked there at the time, Vito Romita and Jovan Stejić. Cunibert immediately drew attention to himself with his work and Prince Miloš invited him to treat members of his family. Miloš was satisfied with how Cunibert took care of the health of his sons Milan and Mihailo, mistress Jelenka and of an illegitimate son Gabriel. Miloš would richly award the Piedmontese physician. In 1828 Cunibert is transferred to the prince's service at a salary of 500 thalers a year.

While travelling in Serbia, Cunibert quickly learned Serbian and began to sign himself as "Bartolomeo". In addition to taking care of the health of the sick heir to the throne Milan, Cunibert was in charge of visiting banjas and military hospitals in Kragujevac and Požarevac and worked to maintain general health. He was an advocate of vaccination. In the summer of 1832 the prince appointment Cunibert the "premier doctor of the district and the city of Belgrade" with a salary of 360 thalers a year and a proviso that he treats the poor free of charge. Then, Miloš Obrenović in 1833 granted him a pension, and in 1835, he included Cunibert in the meritorious pensioners, awarding him 150 thalers, which was also awarded on that occasion to Vuk Karadžić. Cunibert was a welcome guest in the homes of the most prominent Serbs in the Principality, such as Dimitrije Davidović and the prince's younger brother Jevrem Obrenović. However, Jevrem's daughter Anka in her diary Cunibert suspected that she was coming to spy on behalf of the Prince Jevrem and her family. She accused Cunibert's wife Antoinette of hypocrisy and propensity to gossip

Cunibert was a person that the prince could trust, which was clear to contemporaries as well. The French diplomat Boa le Comte in his correspondence with the Minister of Foreign Affairs, Count Henri de Rigny in 1834 suggested that when France opens a consulate in Belgrade, he'll entrust Cunibert with the position of consul. Cunibert generally did not interfere in internal political disputes in Serbia, in the struggle between Prince Miloš and the Defenders of the Constitution. However, when he was in Serbia in 1837 the first British consul arrived George Lloyd Hodges Miloš needed a trusted envoy and an interpreter for frequent contacts with the British diplomatic representative. As a Carbonari, an enemy of the politics of the Holy Alliance, Cunibert was an opponent of Habsburg monarchy as well as Tsarist Russia. He supported Miloš's absolutist policies and attempts to squeeze out Russian influence by closer ties with Great Britain. However, Hodges's diplomacy failed and accelerated the fall of Prince Miloš, who in 1839 was forced to abdicate under pressure from Defenders who enjoyed Russian support.

== After leaving Serbia ==
Cunibert followed the events from the Austrian Zemun that directly led to Miloš's abdication. Accompanied by the deposed prince, he left Zemun because, with his support for Miloš and Anglophile politics, he gained a lot of enemies in Serbia. Milos paid for his trip to his hometown of Savigliano. He last met Miloš in Vienna in 1843. He spent several months there with the former prince. At that time, Miloš Obrenović planned to return to the Serbian throne before a revolt known as the Katanska buna. Miloš wanted to have Dr. Cunibert with him again, so it was agreed that they would meet again in Milan. However, this meeting never took place.

From Cunibert's correspondence with Vuk Karadžić from 1844, it is known that he lived very modestly with a large family and without a permanent income. He was thinking of looking for happiness again in Constantinople or finding a job, with Miloš's recommendation, in the Principality of Wallachia. He died in his hometown on 13 March 1851.

== Serbian Uprising and the First Rule of Miloš Obrenović 1804—1850 ==
During his stay in the Principality of Serbia, Bartolomeo Cunibert began collecting historiographical and ethnographic material on Serbia and its population. It is not known when he began writing his work on the history of the Serbian Revolution and the rule of Prince Miloš. He was partly inspired by the publication of Cyprien Robert's Les Slaves de Turquie (Slavs in Turkey) which appeared in Paris in 1844. Robert's book attracted a lot of attention from the European public, but in it, Prince Miloš Obrenović was shown in the darkest colours.

Cunibert began writing his seminal work with the aim of refuting Cyprien Robert's claims and redeem Prince Miloš. He wrote on the basis of personal memories, literature in French and Serbian, correspondence (including letters from the British consul Hodges), as well as Serbian legal acts. Most of his work has a memoir character. Despite certain weaknesses, due to Cunibert's tendency to justify Miloš's flaws and actions, his work is, according to Dušan T. Bataković, unique among narrative sources about the first reign of Prince Miloš.

The first part of Cunibert's memoir-historical work was published in Paris in 1850. Cunibert continued to work on the second part but died in 1851. According to his instructions, the second part was completed by his brothers Felice and Michelangelo and published in Leipzig in 1855.

Cunibert's history came out for the second time in 1901, translated into Serbian by Milenko Vesnić under the title "Serbian Uprising and the First Rule of Miloš Obrenović 1804-1850." The work was reissued in two volumes in 1988 by the publishing house Prosveta. Dušan T. Bataković wrote the preface explaining the historical value of the work.
