= SAO Eastern Slavonia, Baranja and Western Syrmia =

1991–1992 self-proclaimed Serb oblast in eastern Croatia

Serbian Autonomous Oblast of Eastern Slavonia, Baranja and Western Syrmia: Srpska autonomna oblast Istočna Slavonija, Baranja i Zapadni Srijem (Croatian) Српска аутономна област Источна Славонија, Барања и Западни Срем (Serbian, Cyrillic) Srpska autonomna oblast Istočna Slavonija, Baranja i Zapadni Srem (Serbian, Latin)
- 1991–1992
- Flag

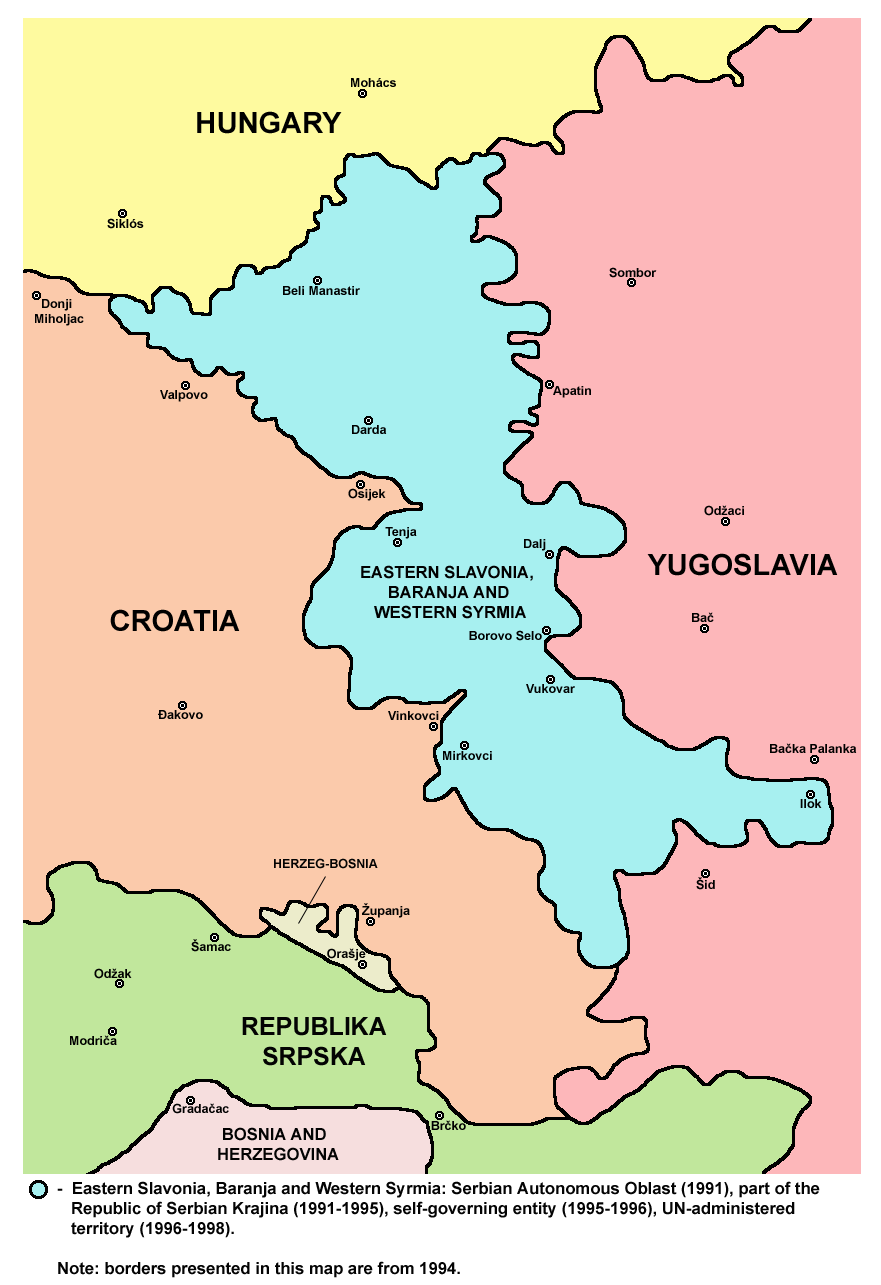
- Eastern Slavonia, Baranja and Western Syrmia
- Status: Self-proclaimed insurgent entity
- Capital: Vukovar
- Government: Interim authority
- Speaker of the People's Assembly
  - 1991–1992: Ilija Končarević
- Prime Minister
  - 1991: Veljko Džakula
  - 1991–1992: Goran Hadžić
- Historical era: Breakup of Yugoslavia
  - Broke away from Croatia: 25 June 1991
  - Incorporated into the Republic of Serbian Krajina: 26 February 1992
- Currency: Krajina dinar
Preceded by	Succeeded by
Republic of Croatia	Republic of Serbian Krajina
- Sources: WorldStatesmen.org

The Serbian Autonomous Oblast of Eastern Slavonia, Baranja and Western Syrmia (Serbo-Croatian: Srpska autonomna oblast Istočna Slavonija, Baranja i Zapadni Srem, Српска аутономна област Источна Славонија, Барања и Западни Срем) was a self-proclaimed Serbian Autonomous Oblast (SAO) in eastern Croatia, established during the Yugoslav Wars. It was one of three SAOs proclaimed on the territory of Croatia. The oblast included parts of the geographical regions of Slavonia, Baranja, and Syrmia along the Croatian section of the Danube river Podunavlje region.

The entity was formed on June 25, 1991, the same day the Socialist Republic of Croatia decided to withdraw from Yugoslavia, following the Croatian independence referendum, 1991. In the first phase of the Croatian War of Independence, in 1992, the oblast joined the breakaway Republic of Serbian Krajina (RSK) as an exclave and the only part of the RSK directly bordering Serbia. As an ethnically diverse area without predominant majority, the region experienced high levels of interethnic violence and cleansing with the expulsion of large majority of ethnic Croats and numerous other non-Serbs. It was at the same time an area of particularly pronounced external actors involvement in the initiation of and support for the local rebellion compared to other parts of Croatia.

After the fall of the western main portion of RSK in 1995 during the Operation Storm this exclave remained the only area in Croatia under the Serb rebel control. Local authorities in Eastern Slavonia, Baranja and Western Syrmia were convinced to sign the 1995 Erdut Agreement which enabled the peaceful reintegration facilitated by the United Nations Transitional Administration for Eastern Slavonia, Baranja and Western Sirmium.

== History ==
=== Background ===
Contrary to western parts of Croatia nationalist Serb Democratic Party was not present at the local level in eastern Croatia ahead of the 1990 Croatian parliamentary election with Serbs in the region strongly supporting local branch of the SKH-SDP which was critical on the party as a whole.

The Croatian parliamentary election, 1990 was organized in an atmosphere of ethnic tensions between Croats and Serbs. The election period in the Vukovar municipality was marked with intense electioneering along national lines. The Serbs were well represented in the SKH-SDP, beyond their representation in the total population. In the villages around Vukovar, numerous protests were organized against the rise of nationalist Croatian Democratic Union (HDZ) on the national level, following the politics of Slobodan Milošević in nearby Vojvodina and Serbia. The municipality committee of the SKH-SDP protested the Croatian delegation's withdrawal from the 14th Congress of the League of Communists of Yugoslavia.

The local HDZ on the other hand organized rallies in Croat-populated villages, advocated for being seen as a representative of all Croats, and represented a grass-roots, less educated section of the population of the municipality, with a relatively inexperienced leadership composed of people outside the intelligentsia, which also made overtures towards reassessing the legacy of the Ustaše, causing dismay among the local Serbs. The election itself went through generally peacefully, with four members of SKH-SDP and an independent elected into the Sabor, four of which were ethnic Croats and one ethnic Serb, and all five were publicly known as people interested in peaceful coexistence. The HDZ was the largest minority party in the local council, and held sway in local governments of Croat-populated villages, while the SKH-SDP dominated the rest, as it received votes from the Serbs, other ethnicities, and some Croats as well. After the election, the Serbs created a local branch of the Serbian Democratic Party (SDS) in June 1990, which initiated rallies converse in content to those of the HDZ but similar in the style of nationalism, and also gained power by having numerous SKH-SDP delegates switch parties.

SKH-SDP representative Slavko Dokmanović, a Serb of Trpinja, became the President of the Municipality Assembly of Vukovar following the 1990 election. In July 1990, Dokmanović appeared on the rally organized by the SDS in Srb, and joined their newly-founded Serbian National Council (SNV). This was met with widespread condemnation, and he was forced to leave that position. Nevertheless, in August 1990, SDS organized a referendum in Serb-populated villages in the region about establishing a Serbian autonomy, that passed overwhelmingly.

=== Founding ===
Following a growth in activities by and support for the SDS in the region throughout the latter part of 1990, they sponsored the founding of a Serbian National Council of Slavonia, Baranja and Western Syrmia at an assembly in Šidski Banovci on January 7, 1991. This matched the developments in the western regions of Croatia, which would form the SAO Krajina in April 1991.

After the Pakrac clash of March 1991, SDS and SNV publicly encouraged a state of psychosis amongst the Serbs in the region, starting a refugee wave from Serb-inhabited villages, following public claims by Goran Hadžić about how their expulsion was imminent. Later the same month, Hadžić was also involved in the 31 of March 1991 Plitvice Lakes incident, which escalated into a crisis in the Serb-inhabited villages in the region. Goran Hadžić and Boro Savić were arrested during the Plitvice Lakes incident when they suffered police abuse during their transport to Zagreb where they ended up in prison hospital. The news of the arrest caused escalation in rural majority Serb villages with violence and minor clashes being reported in Bobota, Borovo, Bršadin and Negoslavci. Goran Hadžić and Boro Savić were released three days later and on their return to eastern Croatia they became the most prominent leaders of the local Serb Democratic Party.

On 31 of March 1991 Serbian National Council of Slavonia, Baranja and Western Syrmia organized a meeting in Borovo where the body declared unification of the region with Vojvodina calling for an urgent extraordinary meeting of the Assembly of Vojvodina and National Assembly of Serbia to confirm the decision. Both assemblies received the request but never formally decided on it. The return of Hadžić temporarily deescalated situation with most of road barricades being removed till the end of the first week of April. Social Democratic Party of Croatia, which as a successor SKH-SDP remained in power but distanced from the SDP headquarters in Zagreb, was at the time was critical of both the Serb Democratic Party and Croatian Democratic Union in their letters to the President of Croatia Franjo Tuđman. Slavko Dokmanović decided to leave the SNV and distance himself from the Serb Democratic Party but at the same time he warned that without the intervention of the federal bodies of the Presidency of Yugoslavia and the Yugoslav People's Army he will also join the barricade keepers in his own village.

The escalation went further, however, when on April 8, 1991 the story was published about high-ranking Croatian officials shooting towards the village of Borovo. On the next day Josip Reihl-Kir tried to deescalate situation by stating that the firing with launch projectiles on Borovo was a response after the attack on Croatian Police without mentioning any Croatian officials. The interpretation of the event remained controversial and relevant in narratives about the beginning of the war in the region. On 1 of May 1991 elderly Serb resident of Bršadin was killed by his Hungarian neighbour with media reporting that the murderer was a member of HDZ leading to blockade of the D55 road despite victim's family calls against it. Serbian media reported that the victim worn Serbian tricolor and was murdered by a Croat while at the same night 2 Croatian policemen were taken hostages in Borovo in the event which will next day lead to the Battle of Borovo Selo leading to the direct involvement of the Yugoslav People's Army in the conflict in the region.

The SAO Eastern Slavonia, Baranja and Western Syrmia was declared on June 25, 1991, and on June 26 its first president was declared to be Goran Hadžić.

=== Inclusion into the RSK ===
Initially, it was a separate Serb autonomous region (oblast), but it subsequently joined the Republic of Serbian Krajina (RSK) in February 1992. Its borders were established by the end of 1991 as entrenched front lines of the first phase of the Croatian War of Independence. Up to August 1995, Eastern Slavonia, Baranja and Western Syrmia was de facto part of the Republic of Serbian Krajina, while de jure still part of Croatia, per United Nations Security Council Resolution 753. The region did not have its own local/regional administration within the RSK. It was nevertheless significantly more aligned with the policies of the FR Yugoslavia compared to western main portion od RSK alignment with Republika Srpska, particularly after FR Yugoslavia imposed sanctions on Republika Srpska in 1994. When after the 1995 Operation Flash Republika Srpska and RSK announced their intention to pursue unification, local leadership in Eastern Slavonia rejected the idea and established the Coordination Committee arguing that the move will deepen the crisis and damage Belgrade's intentions to achieve peace in Bosnia. RSK Authorities in Knin declared the goal of the Coordinating Committee to be the secession of Eastern Slavonia from RSK, claiming that the region is no more under the control of Knin but of Belgrade.

== Geography ==
The territory of the former SAO Eastern Slavonia, Baranja and Western Syrmia was part of the Central European Pannonian Basin. The eastern border of the oblast was mostly the Danube river, while approximately one third of the western border was the Drava river. The Kopački rit natural preserve located near the confluence of Drava and Danube formed a major geographical barrier - there were no road or rail connections between Baranja and the southern parts of the territory, except through Serbia.

Other boundaries were not natural boundaries: the border with Hungary in the north had existed since the Kingdom of Serbs, Croats and Slovenes, the eastern border with FR Yugoslavia partly existed since the Kingdom of Slavonia (on the Danube) and was partly set with the formation of SFR Yugoslavia, while the border with the rest of Croatia in the west and south was formed after the fronts were settled in the first phase of the Croatian War of Independence.

Eastern Slavonia is a mostly flat area, with the best type of soil where agriculture is highly developed, particularly on wheat fields, and it also has several forests as well as vineyards.

The Đeletovci Oil fields are located between the villages of Đeletovci, Banovci and Nijemci.

Traffic over the Brotherhood and Unity Highway (today the A3) was interrupted with the formation of the ESBWS. The water transport over the Danube river continued unobstructed. The Drava river was not navigated at the time. The railway line between Zagreb and Belgrade and the transport between the Budapest and Sarajevo passing through the area were also closed.

== Population ==
The population of this area was ethnically mixed. Before the war, the total population of the area numbered 192,163 inhabitants, and was composed of:

- 90,454 (47%) Croats,
- 61,492 (32%) Serbs, and
- 40,217 (21%) others (Hungarians, Roma, Yugoslavs, Germans, Rusyns, Slovaks, etc.).

During the Croatian War of Independence, 109,500 Serbs lived in this area out of a total of 160,000. which means that the number of Serbs living there has almost doubled while the general population has decreased

War crimes charges brought by the International Criminal Tribunal for the former Yugoslavia against Croatian Serb leader in the region, Goran Hadžić, indicate that virtually all Croat and other non-Serb population of the region was either killed, deported or otherwise forcibly removed from the area.

== Municipalities and Inhabited places ==
During the existence of the Republic of Serbian Krajina, the region was divided into five municipalities:

- Beli Manastir (in Baranja),
- Dalj and Tenja (in eastern Slavonia), and
- Vukovar and Mirkovci (in western Syrmia).

The main cities in the area were Vukovar and Beli Manastir. Other important places included Borovo Selo, Darda, Dalj, Ilok, and Tenja.

== Legacy ==
After the RSK's demise in August 1995, the region was reconstituted again as Eastern Slavonia, Baranja and Western Syrmia. Following the November 1995 Erdut Agreement, it was subsequently controlled by the United Nations Transitional Administration for Eastern Slavonia, Baranja and Western Sirmium. After the war, all the towns and municipalities in the region were designated Areas of Special State Concern. Today the ethnic Serb interests in the region are advocated by the Joint Council of Municipalities.

== See also ==
- Breakup of Yugoslavia
- Croatian War of Independence
- Republic of Serbian Krajina
- SAO Krajina
- SAO Western Slavonia
- Serb Autonomous Regions
- Socialist Republic of Croatia

== Sources ==
- Barić, Nikica (2011). "Srpska oblast Istočna Slavonija, Baranja i Zapadni Srijem – od "Oluje" do dovršetka mirne reintegracije hrvatskog Podunavlja (prvi dio)". Scrinia Slavonica. 11. Zagreb: Hrvatski institut za povijest: 393–451.
- Bartrop, Paul Robert (2012). "Hadžić, Goran (b. 1958)". A Biographical Encyclopedia of Contemporary Genocide: Portraits of Evil and Good. ABC-CLIO. ISBN 9780313386787.
- Lobell, Steven; Mauceri, Philip (2004). Ethnic Conflict and International Politics: Explaining Diffusion and Escalation. Springer. ISBN 978-1-40398-141-7.
- Filipović, Vladimir (2019). "Stranačka politika u Vukovaru 1990-1991" [Party Politics in the Vukovar in 1990-1991]. Annals of the Croatian Political Science Association (in Croatian). 16 (1). Croatian Political Science Association: 97–115. doi:10.20901/an.16.05. ISSN 1847-5299. S2CID 213013973 – via Hrčak.
- Filipović, Vladimir (2022). "Srpska pobuna u selima vukovarske općine 1990. - 1991" [Serb Rebelion in the Villages of Vukovar Municipality 1990. - 1991.]. Scrinia Slavonica (in Croatian). 22 (1). Department for the History of Slavonia, Srijem and Baranja of the Croatian Institute of History: 291–319. doi:10.22586/ss.22.1.9. S2CID 253783796 – via Hrčak.

Region	until 1918	1918– 1929	1929– 1945	1941– 1945	1945– 1946	1946– 1963	1963– 1992	1992– 2003	2003– 2006	2006– 2008	since 2008
Slovenia	Part of Austria-Hungary including the Bay of Kotor See also: Kingdom of Croatia-Slavonia (1868–1918) Kingdom of Dalmatia (1815–1918) Condominium of Bosnia and Herzegovina (1878–1918)	State of Slovenes, Croats and Serbs (1918) Kingdom of Serbs, Croats and Slovenes (1918–1929) Kingdom of Yugoslavia (1929–1943) See also: Republic of Prekmurje (1919) Banat, Bačka and Baranja (1918–1919) Free State of Fiume (1920–1924) (1924–1945) Italian province of Zadar (1920–1947)		Annexed by Italy, Germany, and Hungary^{a}	Democratic Federal Yugoslavia (1943–1945) Federal People's Republic of Yugoslavia (1945–1963) Socialist Federal Republic of Yugoslavia (1963–1992) Consisted of the Socialist Republics of: Slovenia (1945–1991); Croatia (1945–1991); Bosnia and Herzegovina (1945–1992) Serbia (1945–1992) (included the autonomous provinces of Vojvodina and Kosovo) Montenegro (1945–1992); Macedonia (1945–1991) See also: Free Territory of Trieste (1947–1954)^{h}			Republic of Slovenia; Ten-Day War			
Dalmatia	Part of Austria-Hungary including the Bay of Kotor See also: Kingdom of Croatia-Slavonia (1868–1918) Kingdom of Dalmatia (1815–1918) Condominium of Bosnia and Herzegovina (1878–1918)	State of Slovenes, Croats and Serbs (1918) Kingdom of Serbs, Croats and Slovenes (1918–1929) Kingdom of Yugoslavia (1929–1943) See also: Republic of Prekmurje (1919) Banat, Bačka and Baranja (1918–1919) Free State of Fiume (1920–1924) (1924–1945) Italian province of Zadar (1920–1947)		Independent State of Croatia (1941–1945) Puppet state of Germany. Parts annexed by Italy. Međimurje and Baranja annexed by Hungary.	Democratic Federal Yugoslavia (1943–1945) Federal People's Republic of Yugoslavia (1945–1963) Socialist Federal Republic of Yugoslavia (1963–1992) Consisted of the Socialist Republics of: Slovenia (1945–1991); Croatia (1945–1991); Bosnia and Herzegovina (1945–1992) Serbia (1945–1992) (included the autonomous provinces of Vojvodina and Kosovo) Montenegro (1945–1992); Macedonia (1945–1991) See also: Free Territory of Trieste (1947–1954)^{h}			Republic of Croatia^{b} Croatian War of Independence			
Slavonia	Part of Austria-Hungary including the Bay of Kotor See also: Kingdom of Croatia-Slavonia (1868–1918) Kingdom of Dalmatia (1815–1918) Condominium of Bosnia and Herzegovina (1878–1918)	State of Slovenes, Croats and Serbs (1918) Kingdom of Serbs, Croats and Slovenes (1918–1929) Kingdom of Yugoslavia (1929–1943) See also: Republic of Prekmurje (1919) Banat, Bačka and Baranja (1918–1919) Free State of Fiume (1920–1924) (1924–1945) Italian province of Zadar (1920–1947)		Independent State of Croatia (1941–1945) Puppet state of Germany. Parts annexed by Italy. Međimurje and Baranja annexed by Hungary.	Democratic Federal Yugoslavia (1943–1945) Federal People's Republic of Yugoslavia (1945–1963) Socialist Federal Republic of Yugoslavia (1963–1992) Consisted of the Socialist Republics of: Slovenia (1945–1991); Croatia (1945–1991); Bosnia and Herzegovina (1945–1992) Serbia (1945–1992) (included the autonomous provinces of Vojvodina and Kosovo) Montenegro (1945–1992); Macedonia (1945–1991) See also: Free Territory of Trieste (1947–1954)^{h}			Republic of Croatia^{b} Croatian War of Independence			
Croatia	Part of Austria-Hungary including the Bay of Kotor See also: Kingdom of Croatia-Slavonia (1868–1918) Kingdom of Dalmatia (1815–1918) Condominium of Bosnia and Herzegovina (1878–1918)	State of Slovenes, Croats and Serbs (1918) Kingdom of Serbs, Croats and Slovenes (1918–1929) Kingdom of Yugoslavia (1929–1943) See also: Republic of Prekmurje (1919) Banat, Bačka and Baranja (1918–1919) Free State of Fiume (1920–1924) (1924–1945) Italian province of Zadar (1920–1947)		Independent State of Croatia (1941–1945) Puppet state of Germany. Parts annexed by Italy. Međimurje and Baranja annexed by Hungary.	Democratic Federal Yugoslavia (1943–1945) Federal People's Republic of Yugoslavia (1945–1963) Socialist Federal Republic of Yugoslavia (1963–1992) Consisted of the Socialist Republics of: Slovenia (1945–1991); Croatia (1945–1991); Bosnia and Herzegovina (1945–1992) Serbia (1945–1992) (included the autonomous provinces of Vojvodina and Kosovo) Montenegro (1945–1992); Macedonia (1945–1991) See also: Free Territory of Trieste (1947–1954)^{h}			Republic of Croatia^{b} Croatian War of Independence			
Bosnia	Part of Austria-Hungary including the Bay of Kotor See also: Kingdom of Croatia-Slavonia (1868–1918) Kingdom of Dalmatia (1815–1918) Condominium of Bosnia and Herzegovina (1878–1918)	State of Slovenes, Croats and Serbs (1918) Kingdom of Serbs, Croats and Slovenes (1918–1929) Kingdom of Yugoslavia (1929–1943) See also: Republic of Prekmurje (1919) Banat, Bačka and Baranja (1918–1919) Free State of Fiume (1920–1924) (1924–1945) Italian province of Zadar (1920–1947)		Independent State of Croatia (1941–1945) Puppet state of Germany. Parts annexed by Italy. Međimurje and Baranja annexed by Hungary.	Democratic Federal Yugoslavia (1943–1945) Federal People's Republic of Yugoslavia (1945–1963) Socialist Federal Republic of Yugoslavia (1963–1992) Consisted of the Socialist Republics of: Slovenia (1945–1991); Croatia (1945–1991); Bosnia and Herzegovina (1945–1992) Serbia (1945–1992) (included the autonomous provinces of Vojvodina and Kosovo) Montenegro (1945–1992); Macedonia (1945–1991) See also: Free Territory of Trieste (1947–1954)^{h}			Bosnia and Herzegovina^{c} Bosnian War Consists of the Federation of Bosnia and Herzegovina (since 1995), Republika Srpska (since 1995), and Brčko District (since 2000).			
Herzegovina	Part of Austria-Hungary including the Bay of Kotor See also: Kingdom of Croatia-Slavonia (1868–1918) Kingdom of Dalmatia (1815–1918) Condominium of Bosnia and Herzegovina (1878–1918)	State of Slovenes, Croats and Serbs (1918) Kingdom of Serbs, Croats and Slovenes (1918–1929) Kingdom of Yugoslavia (1929–1943) See also: Republic of Prekmurje (1919) Banat, Bačka and Baranja (1918–1919) Free State of Fiume (1920–1924) (1924–1945) Italian province of Zadar (1920–1947)		Independent State of Croatia (1941–1945) Puppet state of Germany. Parts annexed by Italy. Međimurje and Baranja annexed by Hungary.	Democratic Federal Yugoslavia (1943–1945) Federal People's Republic of Yugoslavia (1945–1963) Socialist Federal Republic of Yugoslavia (1963–1992) Consisted of the Socialist Republics of: Slovenia (1945–1991); Croatia (1945–1991); Bosnia and Herzegovina (1945–1992) Serbia (1945–1992) (included the autonomous provinces of Vojvodina and Kosovo) Montenegro (1945–1992); Macedonia (1945–1991) See also: Free Territory of Trieste (1947–1954)^{h}			Bosnia and Herzegovina^{c} Bosnian War Consists of the Federation of Bosnia and Herzegovina (since 1995), Republika Srpska (since 1995), and Brčko District (since 2000).			
Vojvodina	Part of the Délvidék region of Hungary	State of Slovenes, Croats and Serbs (1918) Kingdom of Serbs, Croats and Slovenes (1918–1929) Kingdom of Yugoslavia (1929–1943) See also: Republic of Prekmurje (1919) Banat, Bačka and Baranja (1918–1919) Free State of Fiume (1920–1924) (1924–1945) Italian province of Zadar (1920–1947)		Autonomous Banat^{d} (part of the German; Territory of the Military Commander in Serbia)	Democratic Federal Yugoslavia (1943–1945) Federal People's Republic of Yugoslavia (1945–1963) Socialist Federal Republic of Yugoslavia (1963–1992) Consisted of the Socialist Republics of: Slovenia (1945–1991); Croatia (1945–1991); Bosnia and Herzegovina (1945–1992) Serbia (1945–1992) (included the autonomous provinces of Vojvodina and Kosovo) Montenegro (1945–1992); Macedonia (1945–1991) See also: Free Territory of Trieste (1947–1954)^{h}			Federal Republic of Yugoslavia Consisted of the Republic of Serbia (1992–2006) and Republic of Montenegro (1992–2006) Included Kosovo and Metohija, under UN administration, without control since 1999	State Union of Serbia and Montenegro Included Kosovo, under UN administration	Republic of Serbia Included the autonomous provinces of Vojvodina and Kosovo and Metohija under UN administration	Republic of Serbia Includes the autonomous province of Vojvodina; Kosovo claim
Central Serbia	Kingdom of Serbia (1882–1918)	State of Slovenes, Croats and Serbs (1918) Kingdom of Serbs, Croats and Slovenes (1918–1929) Kingdom of Yugoslavia (1929–1943) See also: Republic of Prekmurje (1919) Banat, Bačka and Baranja (1918–1919) Free State of Fiume (1920–1924) (1924–1945) Italian province of Zadar (1920–1947)		Territory of the Military Commander in Serbia (1941–1944) ^{e}	Democratic Federal Yugoslavia (1943–1945) Federal People's Republic of Yugoslavia (1945–1963) Socialist Federal Republic of Yugoslavia (1963–1992) Consisted of the Socialist Republics of: Slovenia (1945–1991); Croatia (1945–1991); Bosnia and Herzegovina (1945–1992) Serbia (1945–1992) (included the autonomous provinces of Vojvodina and Kosovo) Montenegro (1945–1992); Macedonia (1945–1991) See also: Free Territory of Trieste (1947–1954)^{h}			Federal Republic of Yugoslavia Consisted of the Republic of Serbia (1992–2006) and Republic of Montenegro (1992–2006) Included Kosovo and Metohija, under UN administration, without control since 1999	State Union of Serbia and Montenegro Included Kosovo, under UN administration	Republic of Serbia Included the autonomous provinces of Vojvodina and Kosovo and Metohija under UN administration	Republic of Serbia Includes the autonomous province of Vojvodina; Kosovo claim
Kosovo	Part of the Kingdom of Serbia (1912–1918)	State of Slovenes, Croats and Serbs (1918) Kingdom of Serbs, Croats and Slovenes (1918–1929) Kingdom of Yugoslavia (1929–1943) See also: Republic of Prekmurje (1919) Banat, Bačka and Baranja (1918–1919) Free State of Fiume (1920–1924) (1924–1945) Italian province of Zadar (1920–1947)		Mostly annexed by Italian Albania (1941–1944) along with western Macedonia and south-eastern Montenegro	Democratic Federal Yugoslavia (1943–1945) Federal People's Republic of Yugoslavia (1945–1963) Socialist Federal Republic of Yugoslavia (1963–1992) Consisted of the Socialist Republics of: Slovenia (1945–1991); Croatia (1945–1991); Bosnia and Herzegovina (1945–1992) Serbia (1945–1992) (included the autonomous provinces of Vojvodina and Kosovo) Montenegro (1945–1992); Macedonia (1945–1991) See also: Free Territory of Trieste (1947–1954)^{h}			Federal Republic of Yugoslavia Consisted of the Republic of Serbia (1992–2006) and Republic of Montenegro (1992–2006) Included Kosovo and Metohija, under UN administration, without control since 1999	State Union of Serbia and Montenegro Included Kosovo, under UN administration	Republic of Serbia Included the autonomous provinces of Vojvodina and Kosovo and Metohija under UN administration	Republic of Kosovo
Metohija	Kingdom of Montenegro (1910–1918) Metohija controlled by Austria-Hungary 1915–1918	State of Slovenes, Croats and Serbs (1918) Kingdom of Serbs, Croats and Slovenes (1918–1929) Kingdom of Yugoslavia (1929–1943) See also: Republic of Prekmurje (1919) Banat, Bačka and Baranja (1918–1919) Free State of Fiume (1920–1924) (1924–1945) Italian province of Zadar (1920–1947)		Mostly annexed by Italian Albania (1941–1944) along with western Macedonia and south-eastern Montenegro	Democratic Federal Yugoslavia (1943–1945) Federal People's Republic of Yugoslavia (1945–1963) Socialist Federal Republic of Yugoslavia (1963–1992) Consisted of the Socialist Republics of: Slovenia (1945–1991); Croatia (1945–1991); Bosnia and Herzegovina (1945–1992) Serbia (1945–1992) (included the autonomous provinces of Vojvodina and Kosovo) Montenegro (1945–1992); Macedonia (1945–1991) See also: Free Territory of Trieste (1947–1954)^{h}			Federal Republic of Yugoslavia Consisted of the Republic of Serbia (1992–2006) and Republic of Montenegro (1992–2006) Included Kosovo and Metohija, under UN administration, without control since 1999	State Union of Serbia and Montenegro Included Kosovo, under UN administration	Republic of Serbia Included the autonomous provinces of Vojvodina and Kosovo and Metohija under UN administration	Republic of Kosovo
Montenegro and Brda	Kingdom of Montenegro (1910–1918) Metohija controlled by Austria-Hungary 1915–1918	State of Slovenes, Croats and Serbs (1918) Kingdom of Serbs, Croats and Slovenes (1918–1929) Kingdom of Yugoslavia (1929–1943) See also: Republic of Prekmurje (1919) Banat, Bačka and Baranja (1918–1919) Free State of Fiume (1920–1924) (1924–1945) Italian province of Zadar (1920–1947)		Protectorate of Montenegro^{f} (1941–1944)	Democratic Federal Yugoslavia (1943–1945) Federal People's Republic of Yugoslavia (1945–1963) Socialist Federal Republic of Yugoslavia (1963–1992) Consisted of the Socialist Republics of: Slovenia (1945–1991); Croatia (1945–1991); Bosnia and Herzegovina (1945–1992) Serbia (1945–1992) (included the autonomous provinces of Vojvodina and Kosovo) Montenegro (1945–1992); Macedonia (1945–1991) See also: Free Territory of Trieste (1947–1954)^{h}			Federal Republic of Yugoslavia Consisted of the Republic of Serbia (1992–2006) and Republic of Montenegro (1992–2006) Included Kosovo and Metohija, under UN administration, without control since 1999	State Union of Serbia and Montenegro Included Kosovo, under UN administration	Montenegro	
Vardar Macedonia	Part of the Kingdom of Serbia (1912–1918)	State of Slovenes, Croats and Serbs (1918) Kingdom of Serbs, Croats and Slovenes (1918–1929) Kingdom of Yugoslavia (1929–1943) See also: Republic of Prekmurje (1919) Banat, Bačka and Baranja (1918–1919) Free State of Fiume (1920–1924) (1924–1945) Italian province of Zadar (1920–1947)		Annexed by the Kingdom of Bulgaria (1941–1944)	Democratic Federal Yugoslavia (1943–1945) Federal People's Republic of Yugoslavia (1945–1963) Socialist Federal Republic of Yugoslavia (1963–1992) Consisted of the Socialist Republics of: Slovenia (1945–1991); Croatia (1945–1991); Bosnia and Herzegovina (1945–1992) Serbia (1945–1992) (included the autonomous provinces of Vojvodina and Kosovo) Montenegro (1945–1992); Macedonia (1945–1991) See also: Free Territory of Trieste (1947–1954)^{h}			Republic of North Macedonia^{g}			
^{a} Prekmurje annexed by Hungary.; ^{b} See also: SAO Kninska Krajina (1990) → SAO Krajina (1990–1991); and SAO Eastern Slavonia, Baranja and Western Syrmia (1990–1991), SAO Western Slavonia (1990–1991) and the Republic of Serbian Krajina (1990–1995), all replaced by the UN Transitional Administration for Eastern Slavonia, Baranja and Western Sirmium (1996–1998).; ^{c} See also: Republic of Bosnia and Herzegovina; Croatian Republic of Herzeg-Bosnia; and the Serbian Autonomous Oblasts (SAOs) of Bosanska Krajina, North-East Bosnia, Romanija and Herzegovina (1991–1992), which all combined to form the Serbian Republic of Bosnia and Herzegovina (1992–1995).; ^{d} Bačka was reannexed by Hungary (1941–1944), while Syrmia was annexed by the Independent State of Croatia (1941–1944).; ^{e} Including North Kosovo. See also: Republic of Užice.; ^{f} Annexed by Italy (1941–1943) and Germany (1943–1944). Smaller part annexed by the Independent State of Croatia (1941–1944).; ^{g} North Macedonia's official and constitutional name was the Republic of Macedonia until 2019. It was known in the United Nations as the former Yugoslav Republic of Macedonia because of a naming dispute with Greece.; ^{h} Free Territory was established in 1947. Its administration was divided into two areas (Zone A) and (Zone B). Free Territory was de facto taken over by Italy and SFRY in 1954.
