= Sergey Stanev =

Footballer (born 1988)

Sergey Ilich Stanev
Personal information
- Date of birth: 9 September 1988 (age 38)
- Place of birth: Odessa, Ukraine
- Height: 1.73 m (5 ft 8 in)
- Position: Forward

Youth career
- 2000–2003: Spartak Varna
- 2003–2006: Naftex Burgas

Senior career*
Years	Team	Apps	(Gls)
2006–2007	→ Brestnik 1948 (loan)		
2008	Sportist Svoge		
2009–2010	Spartak Varna		
2010–2011	TSV Elbe Aken 1863 e.V.		
2011–2012	FAC Team für Wien	15	(1)
2012–2013	Kaliakra Kavarna	4	(0)
- * Club domestic league appearances and goals as of 20 March 2013

Sergey Stanev (Bulgarian: Сергей Станев; born 9 September 1988) is a former professional footballer who played as a forward.
