= Mlađen Šljivančanin =

Serbian basketball player (born 1985)

Personal information
- Born: 1 July 1985 (age 41) Belgrade, SR Serbia, SFR Yugoslavia
- Listed height: 2.03 m (6 ft 8 in)
- Listed weight: 92 kg (203 lb)

Career information
- NBA draft: 2007: undrafted
- Playing career: 2002–2014
- Position: Small forward

Career history
- 2002–2003: Partizan
- 2003–2004: Spartak Subotica
- 2004–2005: Skyliners Frankfurt
- 2005–2007: RheinEnergie Köln
- 2007–2008: Crvena zvezda
- 2008–2009: VVS Samara
- 2009–2010: Apollon Limassol
- 2010: Bourg-en-Bresse
- 2010–2011: Keravnos
- 2012: Radnički Belgrade
- 2012–2014: Borac Čačak
- 2014: Timba Timișoara

Career highlights
- German League champion (2006); German Cup winner (2007)
Medals
Men's basketball
Representing Serbia and Montenegro / FR Yugoslavia
U20 European Championship
Bronze medal – third place	2005 Russia	National Team
European Championship for Cadets
Gold medal – first place	2001 Latvia	Team

Mlađen Šljivančanin (Serbian Cyrillic: Млађен Шљиванчанин, born July 1, 1985) is a Serbian former professional basketball player.

== Basketball career ==
Šljivančanin played for Partizan and Spartak Subotica in the YUBA League, as well as Crvena zvezda, Radnički Belgrade and Borac Čačak in the Basketball League of Serbia. Also, with Crvena zvezda he played in the Adriatic League.

Šljivančanin spent a part of his career abroad and played in Germany, France, Russia, Cyprus and Romania. He played for Skyliners Frankfurt and RheinEnergie Köln in the Basketball Bundesliga. In the Russian Super League he played for VVS Samara, while in the French LNB Pro B he played for Bourg-en-Bresse. Šljivančanin played for Apollon Limassol and Keravnos in the Cyprus Basketball Division A. He finished his professional basketball career in the Romanian Liga I where he played for Timba Timișoara.

== Personal life ==
Šljivančanin is a son of Veselin Šljivančanin (b. 1953), a former Montenegrin Serb officer in the Yugoslav People's Army (JNA) who participated in the Battle of Vukovar and was subsequently convicted on a war crimes indictment by the International Criminal Tribunal for the Former Yugoslavia for his role in the Vukovar massacre.
