= Mladen Bošković =

Serbian politician (born 1987)

Mladen Bošković (Serbian Cyrillic: Младен Бошковић; born 1987) is a Serbian politician. He has served in the National Assembly of Serbia since 2020 as a member of the Serbian Progressive Party.

== Private career ==
Bošković was born in Negotin, in what was then the Socialist Republic of Serbia in the Socialist Federal Republic of Yugoslavia. He has a master's degree in economics and has worked for Société Générale Srbija and the German firm Wurth in Belgrade. In August 2018, he became an assistant to the president (i.e., mayor) of the municipality of Negotin on economy and infrastructure.

== Politician ==
Bošković received the 161st position on the Progressive Party's Aleksandar Vučić — For Our Children electoral list in the 2020 Serbian parliamentary election and was elected when the list won a landslide majority with 188 out of 250 mandates. He is a member of the assembly committee on the diaspora and Serbs in the region; a deputy member of the committee on the economy, regional development, trade, tourism, and energy; a deputy member of the committee on finance, state budget, and control of public spending; the leader of Serbia's parliamentary friendship group with Micronesia; and a member of the parliamentary friendship groups with Argentina, Austria, Belgium, Bosnia and Herzegovina, Brazil, China, Cuba, Cyprus, Finland, France, Italy, Germany, Japan, Luxembourg, Malta, Morocco, the Netherlands, the Philippines, Portugal, Russia, Slovenia, South Africa, Spain, Switzerland, Ukraine, the United Kingdom, and the United States of America.
