= Mladen Zrilić =

Serbian volleyball player (born 1986)

Mladen Zrilic
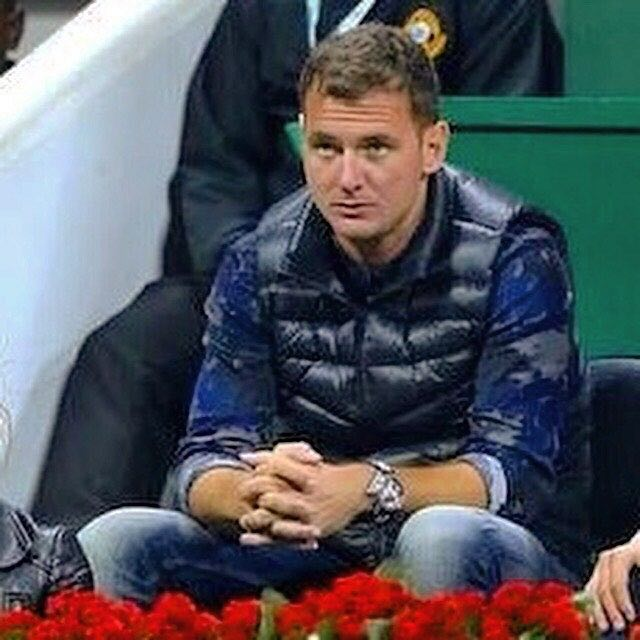
- Zrilić in 2014

Personal information
- Full name: Mladen Zrilić
- Nickname: Mlađa, Zrika, Zićo
- Nationality: Serbia / Montenegro
- Born: 29 July 1986 (age 40); Požarevac, SR Serbia, SFR Yugoslavia
- Height: 196
- Weight: 87
- Spike: 3.45
- Block: 3.35
- Education: Faculty of Economics

Volleyball information
- Current club: El Jaish Qatar

Mladen Zrilić is a Serbian volleyball player.

== Career ==
Zrilić started playing volleyball at age of 13 years old. He started his professional career in his home town Pozarevac playing for team known as Volleyball team Mladi Radnik. Mladen was on the youth and junior national team list and member as well for various competition.

Season 2005-06 team Hadberg SC from Austria

Season 2006-07 team Sibenk SC from Croatia

Season 2007-2008 team Mladi Radnik Pozarevac from Serbia

Season 2008-09 team Trgu Muresh from Romania

Season 2010-11 team Amrsvil from Switzerland

Season 2010-11 team Kalamur SC from Lebanon

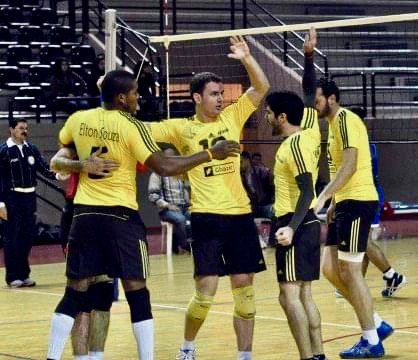
celebration during important moment of league finale game

Season 2011-12 team Ghazir Sc Lebanon

Season 2013-18 team El Jaish SC Qatar Doha

== Qualifications ==
Academic: BSc Economy-Operational Management, College of professional studies for Management and Business communication, Sremski Karlovci, Serbia

- from 2016: Certified Volleyball Coach, III degree Faculty of Sport and Tourism, Novi Sad, Serbia
- from 2018: licensed volleyball coach certified by https://www.ossrb.org/. Licence No. 239/17 member of coach organization from Serbia
- from 2021: CO of https://goldenfalconacademy.com/
