= Mladen Stanev =

Bulgarian conductor (born 1974)

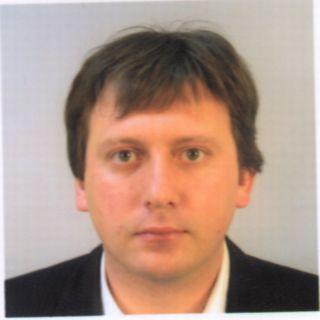
Mladen Stanev

Mladen Stanev (Bulgarian: Младен Станев) (born 1974) is a Bulgarian conductor.

== Early life and education ==
Mladen was born in 1974 in Kotel (Bulgaria). He was a conductor at the National High School for folk music in Kotel from 1988 to 1993. He earned his master's degree in choir conducting from State Music Academy "P.Vladigerov", Sofia . In 2006 he participated in a Master class with Erwin Ortner (Sasha Popov Music Academy).

== Career ==
In 1999 Stanev became the conductor of the Choir of State Opera Stara Zagora . He worked on a wide variety of opera repertoire, cantata and oratorio genre, vocal and symphony music. He was conductor of opera performances for children and concerts. He participated in opera tours with the state opera and co-operation with other opera houses and companies (Verdi opera - Ruse; State opera – Varna; Eventa GmbH; Konzertdirektion Schlote Ges.m.b.H. - Salzburg; etc.) in Europe – Austria (Salzburg – Grosse Festspielhaus - International Theatrerbende 2003, 2004, 2006), Germany, France, Spain, Portugal, Switzerland, Luxembourg, Denmark, Greece (Megaro Music Thessaloniki Concert Hall Organization), and USA (Opera Verdi Europa&Columbia Artist Management), National Reisopera Enschede - Netherlands 2012. 2021 under his leadership the choir of State Opera Stara Zagora became a prizewinner of the award Crystal Lire of the Union of Bulgarian Music and Dancers.

In 2003 he became the conductor of the mixed Choir “Petko Stainov” – cultural house "Iskra". The choir is a leading ensemble in the region of Kazanlak (Valley of Thracian Kings and Roses). They Perform a classical choral repertoire - from Renaissance to 21st century, orthodox chants, works by Bulgarian composers, Requiem - W.A.Mozart. They Participated in the Turkey choir festival in Ankara 2003. have performed concerts in Italy (Ceccano, Veroli, Ferentino) in 2006, Slovak in 2007, 2019, Paris, London, Budapest. Stanev leaded the choir to win a lot of National and International Choral Competitions awards - A. Vivaldi - Karpenisi, Greece 2009, Praha Advent 2016, New Voices and Songs - Bulgaria 2018, National Orthodox Festival Bulgaria 2019, World Peace Choral Festival 2021, May Music Connections - Serbia 2021, The Bulgarian Soul in Sacred Lands - Israel 2022, International Music Festival Michelangelo Buonarotti 2024.

Mladen Stanev was the president of the creative board of International Children's Foundation "STELETOJ" – Sofia (1998 - 2004), Chairman of the Culture Center of Fountain Munu Balkanski 2010 -2022, where he founded M. Balkanski Mixed Choir - prizewinner of a few choral festivals in Bulgaria, Greece, North Macedonia. He is a Director of summer school of music for kids.

From 2016 Mladen Stanev is a music director of National Choir Festival P. Staynov - Kazanlak, Bulgaria.

Stanev also worked with mixed choir "Planinarska Pesen" - Sofia (1994–1999), the mixed choir "Rodina" - Stara Zagora (2004), Choir Slavey (2015 - 2019).

From 2011 - 2013 Stanev is a jury member of Istanbul International Choir Competition, Turkey. He has been the jury member of a different national music competitions. He also is conductor of symphony concerts and is the author of folk songs arrangements and choir compositions.

As a conductor of Mixed Choir Petko Staynov", he is a winner of the special award for the Best Conductor of International Music Festival Michelangelo Buonarotti 2024.

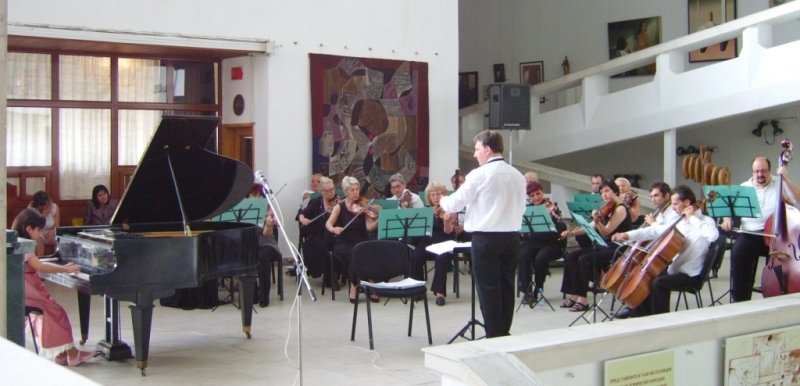
