= Mile Mrkšić =

Croatian Serb war criminal (1947–2015)

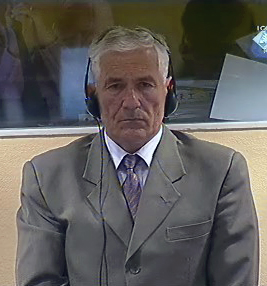
- Mile Mrkšić in a Hague courtroom in May 2009
- Born: 1 May 1947; Kozarac, PR Croatia, FPR Yugoslavia
- Died: 16 August 2015 (aged 68); Lisbon, Portugal
- Burial place: Lešće Cemetery, Belgrade
- Military career
- Allegiance: SFR Yugoslavia; Serbian Krajina; FR Yugoslavia
- Branch: Yugoslav People's Army; Serbian Army of Krajina; Armed Forces of FR Yugoslavia
- Rank: Lieutenant colonel General
- Unit: 1st Motorized Guards Brigade
- Commands: Commander of the Serbian Army of Krajina
- Conflicts: Yugoslav Wars: Croatian War of Independence; Battle of Vukovar; Operation Storm

Signature
- Criminal information
- Status: Deceased
- Convictions: war crimes, crimes against humanity
- Penalty: 20 year imprisonment

Details
- Imprisoned at: Monsanto maximum security prison

Mile Mrkšić (Serbian Cyrillic: Миле Мркшић; 1 May 1947 – 16 August 2015) was a colonel of the Yugoslav People's Army (JNA) in charge of the unit involved in the Battle of Vukovar during the Croatian War of Independence in 1991. He was convicted for not preventing the mass killing of 264 Croats that followed the fall of Vukovar, and sentenced to 20 years.

== Biography ==
Mrkšić was born in Kozarac near Vrginmost on 1 May 1947.

After the battle of Vukovar, he was promoted to General in the JNA and later Commander in Chief of the Serbian Army of Krajina (SVK) in May 1995. After the fall of Krajina in August 1995, he was denied entry into Serbia for a while since many blamed him for the military defeat. At one point he was placed under house arrest, sent into early retirement and ended up selling produce at a green market.

Mrkšić was indicted in 1995, along with Miroslav Radić, Veselin Šljivančanin and Slavko Dokmanović, by the International Criminal Tribunal for the Former Yugoslavia (ICTY). Dokmanović later committed suicide. Mrkšić voluntarily surrendered to the ICTY on 15 May 2002, and was transferred to the court the same day. The trial against him commenced in October 2005 and ended proceedings in 2007, where he was convicted.

=== Charges ===
- Five charges of crimes against humanity: article 5 of the ICTY Statute (persecutions on political, racial and religious grounds; extermination; murder; torture; inhumane acts)
- Three charges of violations of laws or customs of war: article 3 of the ICTY Statute (murder; torture; inhumane acts).

On 27 September 2007, the Trial Chamber found Mrkšić guilty of aiding and abetting the murder of civilians and prisoners of war at Ovčara, aiding and abetting their torture, and aiding and abetting the cruel treatment given there. He was sentenced to 20 years imprisonment. The verdicts caused indignation in Croatia, which had hoped for far more severe sentences. State-run radio called the outcome "shocking", while the Croatian prime minister said the verdicts were "shameful".

=== Sentence ===
In August 2012, Mrkšić was sentenced to 20 years in prison to be served in the high security prison of Monsanto, Portugal. He died three years later on 16 August 2015 at public hospital in Lisbon, aged 68.

Military offices
Preceded by Milan Čeleketić	Commander of the Serbian Army of Krajina; 17 May 1995 – 7 August 1995	Succeeded by Army disbanded
