= Mladen Banović =

Croatian scientist

- Education: University of Zagreb
- Known for: Transformers Magazine (editor-in-chief)
- Spouse: Ivana
- Children: 7
- Scientific career
- Fields: electrotechnics
- Workplaces: Končar Group; ABB; Merit Media Int.
- Thesis: Klasifikacija grešaka energetskih transformatora na osnovi koncentracija otopljenih plinova u ulju (2012.)
- Doctoral advisor: Zlatko Maljković

Mladen Banović is an international scientist specialised in transformers. He is a founder and editor-in-chief of the Transformers Magazine and director at Merit Media Int., a company with customers in 190 countries.

He graduated in 1999 and obtained his doctorate in 2012 at the Faculty of Electrical Engineering and Computing of the University of Zagreb. He is an author of several scientific articles and works. He is also the author of three books and editor of two books.
