= Mladen Janković =

Director of the first psychiatric institution in the Principality of Serbia

Mladen Janković (Kanjiža, 1831 - Belgrade, Kingdom of Serbia, 1885) was a Serbian medical doctor, who after arriving from the Austrian Empire to the Principality of Serbia, from 1856 to 1865 he became a district medical doctor in Kruševac, Jagodina, Kragujevac, and from 1865 a physician in Belgrade and director of the first psychiatric institution in the Principality of Serbia called Dom za Uma sišavše (Home for the Mentally Challenged), in which he organized his work according to modern European standards. He was a participant in the second Serbian-Turkish War of 1877-1878 and he was one of the founders and president for many years (1873-1884) of the Serbian Medical Society.

== Life and career ==
He was born in Kanjiža in Austro-Hungary in 1831. He finished high school in Hungarian in Szeged, and then the Faculty of Medicine in Pest in 1856. With the desire to serve his people immediately after graduation, as a young doctor, he came to the Principality of Serbia and for a time performed the duty of a physician of the Kruševac District, with the title of "Doctor of All Medicine".

According to the needs of the service, and due to the poor health of the population, and frequent epidemics of infectious diseases in certain parts of Serbia, Dr. Mladen Janković was urgently transferred from Kruševac and appointed district physician in Jagodina. After he managed to suppress the epidemic of infectious diseases in Jagodina, he was sent to Kragujevac, as the fourth district physician in that city, to continue the fight against the epidemic of infectious diseases, which spread throughout Šumadija. He performed this duty from 1861 to 1865.

As a connoisseur of health legislation, organization, and service in Austria and Hungary, Dr. Mladen Janković knew how to apply this experience to the opportunities in the Principality of Serbia, and very quickly distinguished himself with favourable results. Appreciating these abilities of Dr. Mladen Janković, the health authorities of the Principality of Serbia transferred him to the position of the physician of the Greater Belgrade administration in 1865.

He died in Belgrade as a result of pneumonia at the age of 56. About his untimely death in historical writings, among other things, he wrote:

When the hoof-and-mouth disease appeared in the autumn of 1884, due to which the Austro-Hungarian government banned the import of our cattle, our government sent Dr. Janković as deputy chief ambulance in Pest to resolve this issue. On his return, he developed a high fever due to a cold, but despite his illness, he also performed the duty of the chief of the ambulance, and in that endeavour, he received pneumonia, which took his life in 1885.

== Manager of the "Home for the Mentally Challenged" (1865-1881) ==
As the first psychiatric institution was established in the Principality of Serbia in Belgrade in 1861 under the name "The Home for the Mentally Challenged", it required more professional guidance, by decree of the state leadership of the Principality of Serbia Psychiatric hospitals in Serbia by decree:

"Mihailo M. Obrenović, by the grace of God and the will of the people Prince of Serbia, at the suggestion of our Minister of the Interior, we appoint Physician of the Belgrade City Administration, Dr. Mladen Janković, as temporary administrator and doctor of the Home for the Mentally Challenged".

Bearing in mind that this job cannot be performed by a doctor without education, the Sanitary Administration of the Principality of Serbia decided to first send Dr. Mladen Janković to Germany for a three-month professional training with a leading person in psychiatry, Dr. Wilhelm Griesinger, and only then appoint him manager.

After Dr. Janković got acquainted with the organization of mental hospitals in Germany and gained the necessary professional knowledge in psychiatry, he returned to Serbia and immediately underwent numerous organizational and professional changes in the "Home for the Mentally Challenged". He removed from the hospital all technical devices by which a violent patient could be hurt or injured.
