= Veselin Šljivančanin =

Yugoslav army colonel and convicted war criminal

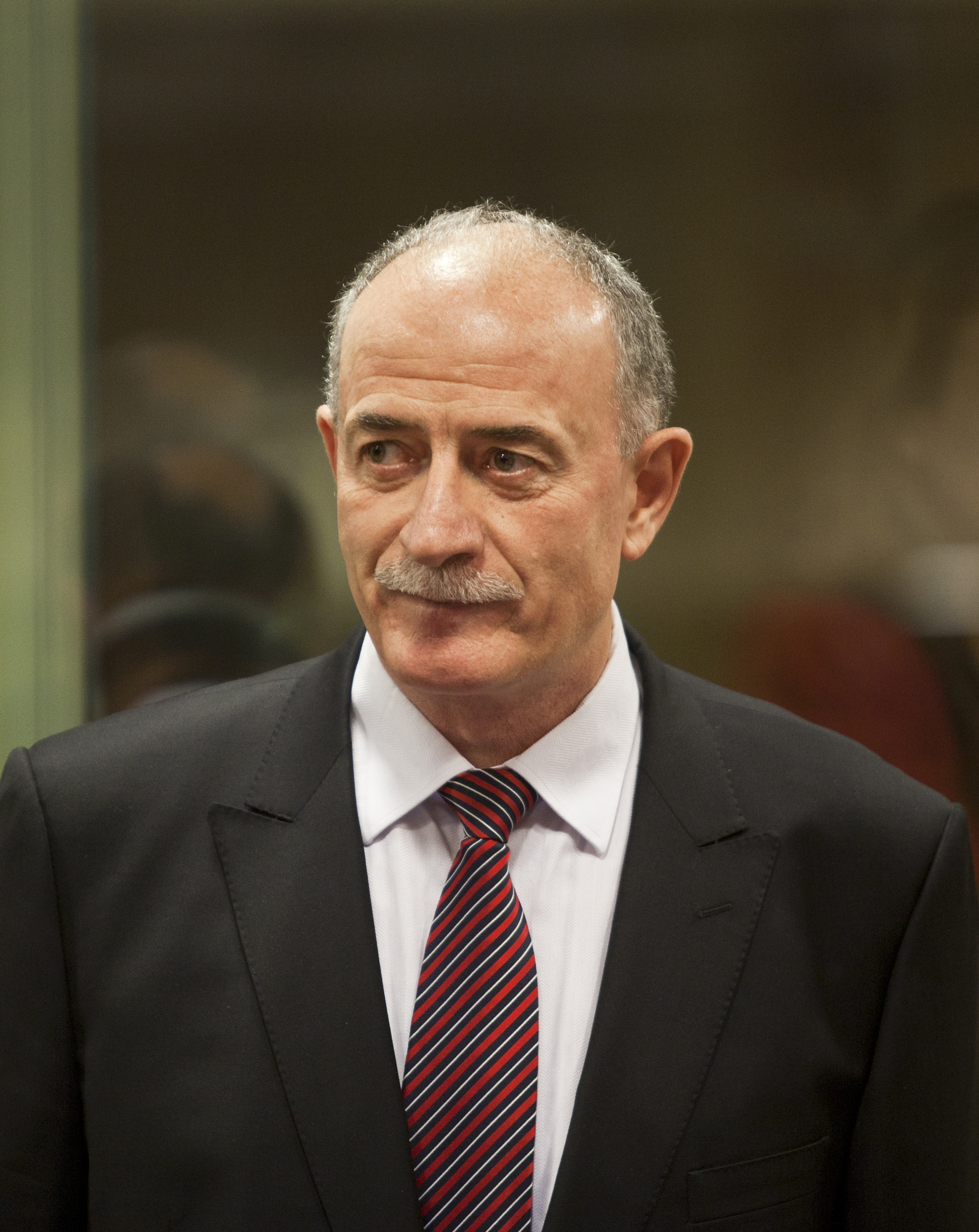
- Šljivančanin in 2010
- Born: 13 June 1953 (age 72); Palež near Žabljak, PR Montenegro, FPR Yugoslavia
- Allegiance: SFR Yugoslavia (1991–1992); FR Yugoslavia (1992–2001)
- Branch: Yugoslav People's Army
- Service years: 1991–2001
- Rank: Colonel
- Conflicts: Battle of Vukovar

Veselin Šljivančanin (Serbian Cyrillic: Веселин Шљиванчанин; born 13 June 1953) is a former Montenegrin Serb officer in the Yugoslav People's Army (JNA) who participated in the Battle of Vukovar and was subsequently convicted on a war crimes indictment by the International Criminal Tribunal for the Former Yugoslavia for his role in the Vukovar massacre. His prison sentence was changed twice, from five to seventeen to ten years. He has since been ordered released by the ICTY on time served and good behavior.

== Biography ==
Šljivančanin was born in the village of Palež near Žabljak, PR Montenegro, then FPR Yugoslavia. His family belongs to the Drobnjaci tribe, and have the slava of St. George. As a Major of the JNA, Šljivančanin took part in the battle of Vukovar which was fought from the end of August until 18 November 1991. After the fall of Vukovar, he was promoted to the rank of lieutenant colonel and was placed in command of a brigade of JNA stationed at Podgorica (then still known as Titograd), Montenegro.

He was promoted to colonel in the beginning of 1996, in the new national army of FR Yugoslavia following the disbanding of the JNA, and transferred to the Military Academy in Belgrade, where he served as a lecturer in military tactics. He retired from military service in October 2001.

== Trial ==
Šljivančanin was indicted in 1995, along with Mile Mrkšić, Miroslav Radić and Slavko Dokmanović, by the International Criminal Tribunal for the Former Yugoslavia (ICTY). The indictment accused him of "responsibility for the mass killing at Ovčara, near Vukovar, of approximately 260 captive non-Serb men", on the following grounds:

- he was in direct command of JNA forces (then controlled by Serbia and Montenegro and consisting of Serbs and a minority of Montenegrins) that took control of the Vukovar Hospital on 18 November 1991 and evacuated people from there over the following days to the Ovčara farm building;
- he personally directed the selection and removal from the hospital of about 400 non-Serbs whom the JNA suspected to be Croatian paramilitaries;
- he ordered JNA soldiers under his command to deliver custody of the detainees to other Serb forces who physically executed them.

He was arrested in Belgrade by Serbian authorities on 13 June 2003, as part of the new policy of Serbia and Montenegro in which they agreed to comply with the UN and the ICTY. He was handed over to the ICTY on 1 July. The trial against him commenced in October 2005. The court's verdict on 27 September 2007, found Šljivančanin guilty of "aiding and abetting the torture of the prisoners" and sentenced him to five years in prison. He was found not-guilty of crimes against humanity, as the court found that the Serbian Territorial Defence and local Serb paramilitaries had carried out the killings. The court found that Šljivančanin as a JNA officer did not prevent the beating of prisoners by local Serb forces.

The sentence caused outrage among the Croatian public and press, with Croatia's political leaders voicing outrage to the verdict.

The BBC World Service interviewed one of the paramedics who was on duty at Vukovar's hospital, who said "if you stole a car today you would get a harsher sentence than what they got for the biggest crime that was committed here in the past 50 years".

On 5 May 2009, the court announced it would increase the sentence for Šljivančanin to 17 years for aiding and abetting the murder of prisoners of war after the fall of Vukovar, while his guilt for aiding and abetting torture was reaffirmed. The official statement states that the Appeals Chamber found that the Trial Chamber erred in acquitting Šljivančanin of aiding and abetting murder in Vukovar. Judge Theodor Meron stated that "Šljivančanin was under a duty to protect the prisoners of war held at Ovčara and that this responsibility included the obligation not to allow the transfer of custody of the prisoners of a war to anyone without first satisfying himself that they would not be harmed. Mr. Mrkšić’s order to withdraw the JNA troops did not relieve him of his position as an officer of the JNA." His sentence was reduced to 10 years in December 2010 based on a testimony of Miodrag Panić, a JNA officer who stated that Šljivančanin was not informed by Mrkšić that JNA soldiers would be pulled back from Ovčara.

Šljivančanin was released on early for good behavior and time spent. The ICTY ordered his "early release" and that he "shall be released from the custody of the Tribunal as soon as practicable and once the administrative procedures have been completed."

== Personal life ==
Šljivančanin has two children: a daughter Olja and a son, Mlađen, a former professional basketball player.
