= Mladen Iveković =

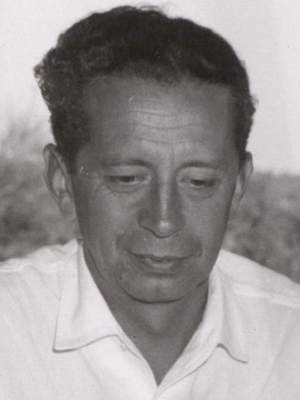
- Mladen Iveković in 1950
- Born: 1 April 1903; Zagreb, Kingdom of Croatia-Slavonia, Austria-Hungary
- Died: 18 December 1970 (aged 67); Zagreb, SR Croatia, SFR Yugoslavia
- Other names: Ivan Mladenović, Kid, Luka Koren, Spektator, Viator
- Education: Faculty of Law, University of Zagreb, and Paris School for Advanced Studies in the Social Sciences
- Occupations: Politician, diplomat
- Political party: Communist Party of Yugoslavia, Communist Party of Croatia

Mladen Iveković (1 April 1903 – 18 December 1970) was a Croatian and Yugoslavian politician and diplomat.

Born in Zagreb, Iveković studied law at the Faculty of Law, University of Zagreb and at the School for Advanced Studies in the Social Sciences in Paris. He obtained his doctoral degree at the Zagreb University in 1928. Iveković contributed to start of publication of a number of newspapers in 1930s while serving as the secretary of the Zagreb Crafts Chamber. As a member of the Communist Party of Yugoslavia, Iveković actively organised foreign volunteers for service in the Spanish Civil War. His pseudonyms included: Ivan Mladenović, Kid, Luka Koren, Spektator, and Viator. As a member of the propaganda department of the Communist Party of Croatia (KPH), Iveković helped start Politički vjesnik in 1940 (renamed Vjesnik three years later), serving as its editor until 1945.

Iveković was arrested and taken to the Jasenovac concentration camp in January 1942. He was released in September, together with the 4th Secretary of the Communist Party of Croatia Andrija Hebrang in a prisoner exchange. Iveković was elected into the Executive Council of the Anti-Fascist Council for the National Liberation of Yugoslavia (AVNOJ) at the AVNOJ's first session held in Bihać in 1942 and tasked with social policy matters. In 1943, he became the head of the propaganda service of the KPH for the region of Slavonia, and a member of the State Anti-Fascist Council for the National Liberation of Croatia (ZAVNOH). Iveković also led ZAVNOH's propaganda activities, and was a member of its legislative commission. In the 1945 Government of the People's Republic of Croatia, Iveković was appointed industry and mining minister.

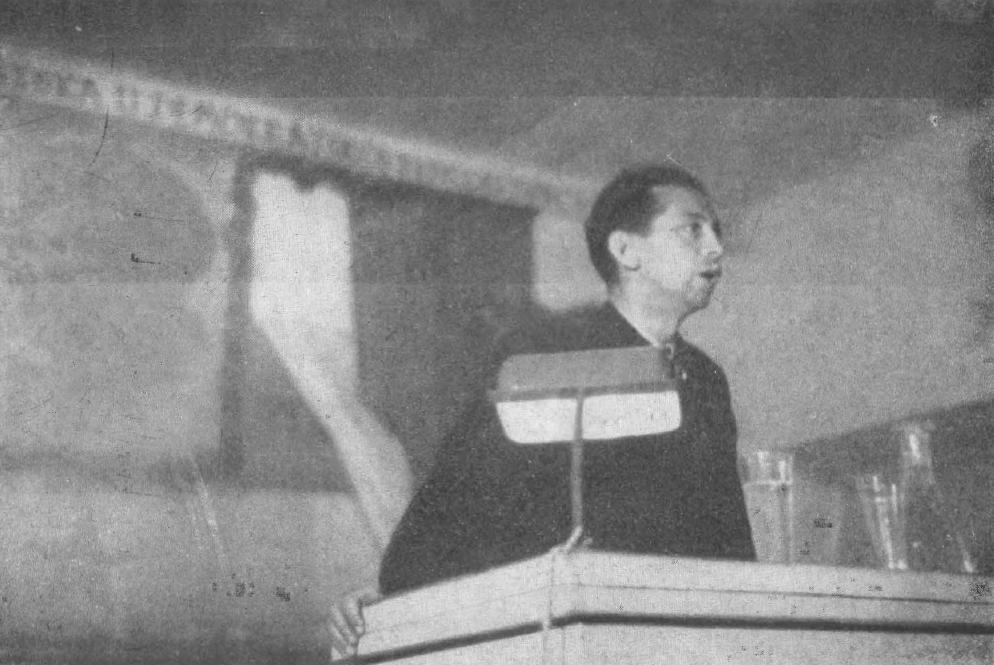
Iveković speaking at the third session of ZAVNOH in Topusko (May 1944)

After the World War II, he was elected a member of the Yugoslav constituent assembly and subsequently the member of the federal parliament for Zagreb until 1963. From 1946 to 1947, he was Yugoslav representative to the Allied Commission for World War II reparations in Bruxelles, Yugoslav ambassador to Italy in 1947–1952, and West Germany in 1952–1956 before serving as the Deputy Foreign Minister in 1956–1958. He was a member and the president of the administrative board of Tanjug Yugoslav news agency from 1958 until he retired in 1963. In 1959, he became a member of the Central Committee of the KPH. He taught at the Faculty of Political Science, University of Zagreb in 1965–1966. He died in Zagreb.

Bibliography

- Iveković, Mladen (1945). Nepokorena zemlja: Zapisi iz IV. i V. Neprojateljske ofenzive protiv narodno-oslobodilačke vojske i partizanskih odreda Jugoslavije [Unvanquished Land: Records from the 4th and the 5th Enemy Offensive Against the National Liberation Army and Partisan Detachments of Yugoslavia] (in Croatian). Zagreb: Nakladni zavod Hrvatske. OCLC 943937378.
- Iveković, Mladen (1964). Inteligencija hrvatske u borbi: povodom 20-godišnjice I. kongresa kulturnih i javnih radnika u Topuskom [Intelligentsia of Croatia in the Struggle: On the Occasion of 20 Years of the 1st Congress of Cultural and Public Workers in Topusko] (in Croatian). Zagreb: Prosvjetni sabor Hrvatske. OCLC 1267937989.
- Iveković, Mladen; Bratulić, Vjekoslav (1970). Hrvatska lijeva inteligencija 1918-1945 [Croatian Left Intelligentsia 1918–1945] (in Croatian). Zagreb: Naprijed. OCLC 15038347.
