= Miroslav Radić =

Serbian army officer (born 1962)

Miroslav Radić (born 10 September 1962) is a Serbian army officer who became prominent in the Battle of Vukovar, and was later prosecuted for alleged complicity in the Vukovar massacre, but was released after being acquitted by the ICTY.

Radić graduated in 1985 from the Military Academy of the Yugoslav People's Army in Sarajevo as an infantry officer. During the Battle of Vukovar, he held the rank of captain and commanded the infantry company of the 1st Battalion of the 1st Guard Mechanized Brigade. After the Battle of Vukovar, he left the army and began making ventures in private businesses. He voluntarily surrendered to the ICTY in April 2007. He was acquitted of the charges in a judgment rendered on 27 September 2007.

== War crimes ==
Radić turned himself in to the war crimes tribunal in 2002. Radić was formally charged with "crimes against humanity and war crimes including persecutions: Political, racial, and religious grounds, extermination, murder, torture, inhuman acts and cruel treatment", and pleaded not guilty to all counts. He was acquitted on all counts on 27 September 2007, after it was determined that his soldiers had provided the initial security for Vukovar hospital during the massacre, but the cross-examination of three witnesses failed to produce evidence that Radić himself had knowledge of the massacre at Ovčara during the event.
