= Vukovar massacre =

Massacre of civilians and prisoners of war following the Battle of Vukovar

- Part of the Croatian War of Independence
- Vukovar on the map of Croatia; areas held by the JNA and Croatian Serb troops in late 1991 are highlighted in red
- Location: 45°17′44″N 19°03′33″E; Grabovo, just outside Vukovar, Croatia
- Date: November 20, 1991; 34 years ago
- Target: Croat prisoners of war and civilians, as well as some Serbs, Muslims, Hungarians, Pannonian Rusyns, and Ukrainians
- Attack type: Mass murder, summary executions, ethnic cleansing
- Victims: 200 killed and exhumed at the site c. 60 missing, presumed dead
- Perpetrators: Croatian Serb Territorial Defense, Leva Supoderica Serbian paramilitary unit, and the Yugoslav People's Army

The Vukovar massacre, also known as the Vukovar hospital massacre or the Ovčara massacre, was the killing of at least 200 Croatian prisoners of war and civilians by Serb paramilitaries, to whom they had been turned over by the Yugoslav People's Army (JNA), at the Ovčara farm southeast of Vukovar on 20 November 1991, during the Croatian War of Independence. The massacre occurred shortly after Vukovar's capture by the JNA, Territorial Defence (TO), and paramilitaries from neighbouring Serbia. It was the largest massacre of the Croatian War of Independence.

In the final days of the battle, the evacuation of the Vukovar hospital was negotiated between Croatian authorities, the JNA and the European Community Monitor Mission in cooperation with the International Committee of the Red Cross (ICRC). The JNA subsequently refused the ICRC access to the hospital despite the agreement and removed approximately 300 people from its premises. The group, largely consisting of Croats but also including Serbs, Hungarians, Bosniaks and two foreign nationals who fought on the side of the Croatian National Guard, was initially transported to the JNA barracks in Vukovar. Several prisoners were identified as hospital staff and removed from the group to be returned to the hospital while the rest of them were transported to the Ovčara farm south of Vukovar. Once at the farm, the prisoners were beaten for several hours before the JNA pulled its troops from the site, leaving the prisoners in the custody of the Croatian Serb TO and Serbian paramilitaries. The prisoners were then taken to a prepared site, shot in groups of ten to twenty and buried in a mass grave.

The mass grave was discovered in October 1992 and guarded by the United Nations Protection Force which had deployed to the area earlier that year. In 1996, 200 sets of remains were exhumed from the grave by International Criminal Tribunal for the former Yugoslavia (ICTY) investigators. Croatia believes 61 others were buried in a different grave on the site, while ICTY prosecutors believe that figure stands at 60. The ICTY convicted two JNA officers in connection with the massacre, and also tried former Serbian President Slobodan Milošević for a number of war crimes, including those committed at Vukovar. Milošević died in prison before his trial could be completed. Several former members of the Croatian Serb TO and Serbian paramilitary units have been tried by the Serbian judiciary and convicted for their involvement in the massacre. In February 2015, the International Court of Justice ruled that the siege, massacre and simultaneous atrocities committed elsewhere in Croatia did not constitute genocide.

The site of the mass grave is marked by a monument and the storage building used at Ovčara farm to hold the prisoners in captivity before their execution was rebuilt as a memorial centre in 2006. By July 2014, the centre had been visited by about 500,000 tourists.

== Background ==
In 1990, ethnic tensions between Serbs and Croats worsened after the electoral defeat of the government of the Socialist Republic of Croatia by the Croatian Democratic Union (Croatian: Hrvatska demokratska zajednica – HDZ). The Yugoslav People's Army (Serbo-Croatian: Jugoslovenska narodna armija – JNA) confiscated Croatia's Territorial Defence (Croatian: Teritorijalna obrana – TO) weapons to minimize resistance. On 17 August, the tensions escalated into an open revolt of the Croatian Serbs. The rebellion was centred on the predominantly Serb-populated areas of the Dalmatian hinterland around Knin, approximately 60 kilometres (37 miles) north-east of Split, as well as parts of Lika, Kordun, Banovina and eastern Slavonia. In January 1991, Serbia, supported by Montenegro and Serbia's provinces of Vojvodina and Kosovo, unsuccessfully tried to obtain the Yugoslav Presidency's approval for a JNA operation to disarm Croatia's security forces. The request was denied, and a bloodless skirmish between Serb insurgents and the Croatian special police occurred that March. This prompted the JNA itself to ask the Federal Presidency to grant it wartime authority and declare a state of emergency. Even though the request was backed by Serbia and its allies, on 15 March, the Federal Presidency declined. Serbian President Slobodan Milošević, preferring a campaign to expand Serbia rather than to preserve Yugoslavia with Croatia as a federal unit, publicly threatened to replace the JNA with a Serbian army and declared that he no longer recognized the authority of the Federal Presidency. As the JNA came under Milošević's control, the JNA abandoned its plans to preserve Yugoslavia in favour of expanding Serbia. The first casualties of the conflict occurred by the end of March. In early April, the leaders of the Serb revolt in Croatia declared their intention to unite the areas under their control with Serbia. These areas came to be viewed as breakaway regions by the Government of Croatia.

At the beginning of 1991, Croatia had no regular army. To bolster its defence, Croatia doubled its police numbers to about 20,000. The most effective part of the Croatian police force was a 3,000-strong special police comprising twelve battalions organised along military lines. There were also 9,000–10,000 regionally organised reserve police in 16 battalions and 10 companies, but they lacked weapons. In response to the deteriorating situation, the Croatian government established the Croatian National Guard (Croatian: Zbor narodne garde – ZNG) in May by expanding the special police battalions into four all-professional guards brigades. Under the control of the Croatian Ministry of Defence and commanded by retired JNA General Martin Špegelj, the four guards brigades comprised approximately 8,000 troops. The reserve police, also expanded to 40,000, was attached to the ZNG and reorganised into 19 brigades and 14 independent battalions. The guards brigades were the only units of the ZNG that were fully equipped with small arms; throughout the ZNG there was a lack of heavier weapons and there was poor command and control structure above the brigade level. The shortage of heavy weapons was so severe that the ZNG resorted to using World War II-era arms taken from museums and film studios. At the time, the Croatian weapon stockpile consisted of 30,000 small arms purchased abroad and 15,000 previously owned by the police. To replace the personnel lost to the guards brigades, a new 10,000-strong special police was established.

== Prelude ==
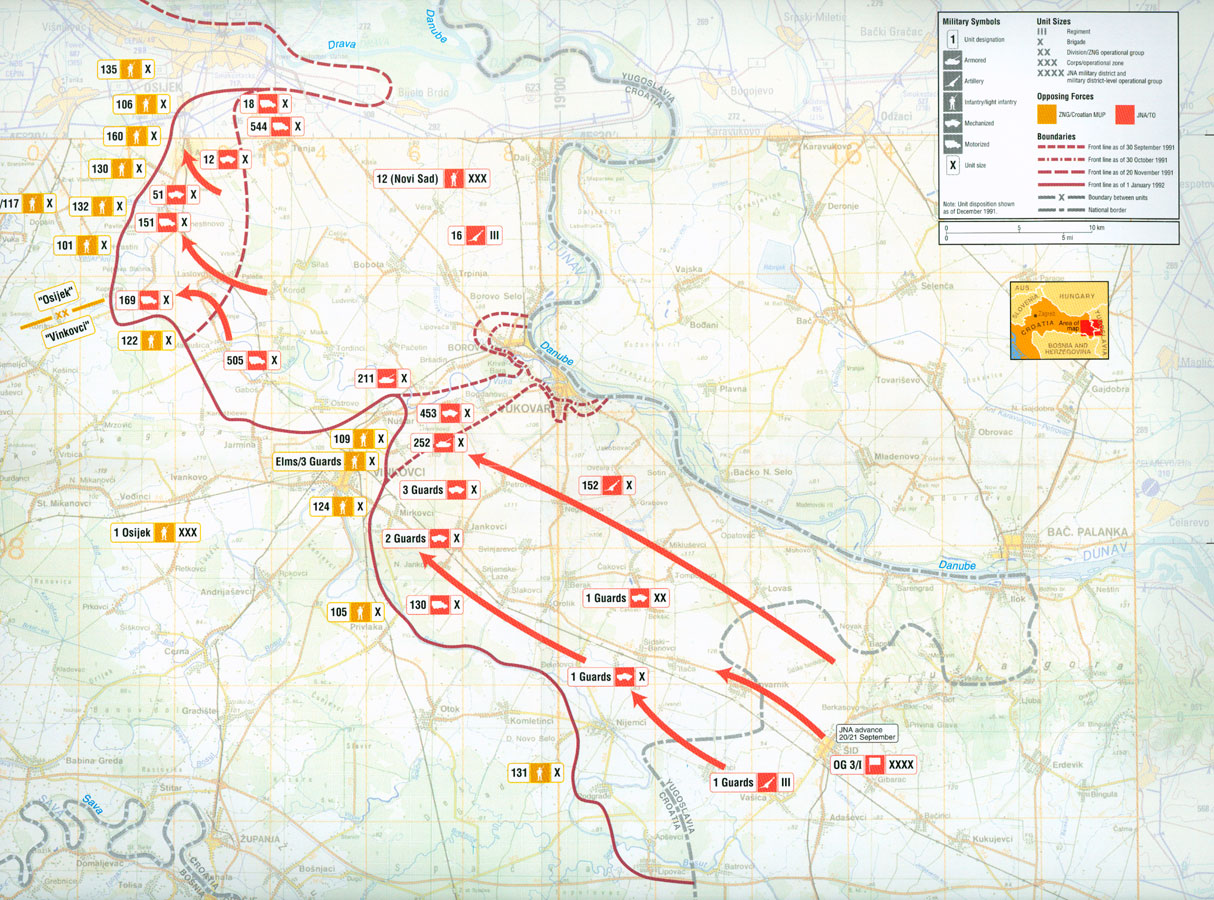
Map of military operations in eastern Slavonia, September 1991 – January 1992.

After Croatia launched the Battle of the Barracks on 14–15 September to capture the JNA's facilities in Croatia, the JNA launched a small-scale operation against Vukovar to relieve the city garrison. At the same time, it began large-scale mobilisation of men in preparation for its campaign in Croatia. It was met with widespread refusal of mobilised personnel to report to their designated units, desertions and an overall lack of enthusiasm for the campaign. The response rate was particularly poor in Central Serbia, where only 26 percent of those called up reported for service. This resulted in low troop availability, forcing the JNA to deploy fewer infantry units.

The JNA's offensive operations, directly associated with the campaign in the east Croatian region of Slavonia, were launched on 20 September. The assault on Vukovar gradually became the main effort of the campaign as the JNA was repeatedly unable to capture the city. The fighting in and around Vukovar lasted months and eventually drew in the JNA's main armoured force, which had previously been slated to advance west towards Serb-held areas in western Slavonia. In addition to relieving its Vukovar garrison, the JNA wished to dissipate the Croatian forces in the city so that they would not pose any threat to its rear in the event that the campaign progressed west of Vinkovci.

The JNA was reinforced by local Serb-manned TO units and Serbian paramilitary volunteers who were meant to replace those reservists that had failed to respond to their call-up. The volunteers were often motivated by ethnic hatred, looted countless homes and committed numerous atrocities against civilians. After more than two months of fighting, the Croatian forces surrendered on 18 November. Vukovar sustained significant damage due to the JNA's artillery and rocket barrages. By the end of the battle, over 700,000 shells and other missiles had been fired at the city, at a rate of up to 12,000 per day.

== Timeline ==
=== Evacuation arrangements ===
Map of eastern Slavonia area between Osijek and Vukovar (Modern county lines provided for reference)

On 17 November, Major General Andrija Rašeta, the commander of the JNA 5th (Zagreb) Military District, notified the European Community Monitor Mission (ECMM) that the JNA accepted in principle the quick evacuation of vulnerable persons from Vukovar. At the time, it was estimated that there were about 400 people trapped in the city's hospital, but the actual number was later discovered to be about 450. This included about 40 patients receiving treatment for severe injuries sustained over the preceding few days and about 360 patients recovering from wounds suffered earlier on. In addition to these individuals, some civilians had taken shelter in the hospital in the final days of the battle. They moved there expecting to be evacuated from the city, even though the hospital itself was subjected to daily artillery attack. Furthermore, a number of Croatian troops took refuge in the hospital posing as patients or staff.

On 18 November, the Tripartite Commission, consisting of representatives of Croatia, the JNA and the ECMM, discussed methods of evacuation with representatives of the International Committee of the Red Cross (ICRC), the Médecins Sans Frontières and the Malteser International. On the night of 18/19 November, Rašeta and Croatian Health Minister Andrija Hebrang signed an agreement on the evacuation. The agreement guaranteed that the evacuees would travel via the route Lužac suburb–Bogdanovci–Marinci–Zidine junction–Nuštar–Vinkovci. They were to be handed over to international authorities at the Zidine junction, the hospital was to be placed under the control of the ICRC and the ECMM was to oversee the entire operation. Hebrang notified the hospital director Vesna Bosanac of the agreement and told her that ICRC teams would arrive. That evening Siniša Glavašević, a radio reporter who had covered the entire course of the siege from within the city, broadcast his final report from the hospital. Glavašević himself hoped to leave the city with the ICRC, fearing for his life should the Serb paramilitaries capture him.

=== Takeover of the hospital ===
On the morning of 19 November, the ECMM became aware that organised resistance had ceased in Vukovar, but it did not receive any information on the fate of the hospital patients. Consequently, the head of the ECMM, ambassador Dirk Jan van Houten, contacted Rašeta asking him to intervene on the ECMM's behalf. That day, a JNA unit arrived at the hospital and Bosanac was taken to meet JNA Colonel Mile Mrkšić. According to Bosanac, Mrkšić told her that he was not obligated by the evacuation agreement. Even though the ICRC was not granted access to Vukovar by JNA officers at the scene, in the early evening of 19 November, ICRC representative Nicolas Borsinger managed to reach the hospital claiming he had an appointment with "a general". Once there, Borsinger found a JNA captain in charge of the facility who agreed to grant the ICRC access. Borsinger then rejoined the ICRC convoy that was moving towards the hospital to evacuate it. The hospital was also toured by French reporter Agnès Vahramian that day, and there she recorded an interview with Jean-Michel Nicolier, a wounded Frenchman who fought alongside Croatian forces in Vukovar. Vahramian offered Nicolier a press pass to try to get him out of the city, but he refused.

On the morning of 20 November, the ICRC convoy reached Vukovar, only to be stopped at a bridge near the hospital. An armoured vehicle blocked access to the bridge leading to the hospital, and a JNA officer at the scene, Major Veselin Šljivančanin, refused to let the ICRC pass. In order to facilitate negotiations with the ICRC at the scene, BBC reporter Martin Bell volunteered his interpreter. In a confrontation recorded by television cameras, Šljivančanin told the ICRC personnel: "This is my country, we have conquered this. This is Yugoslavia, and I am in command here!" The ECMM personnel that had arrived at the Zidine junction to meet the returning convoy were informed by the JNA that the evacuees would instead be turned over to them in Bosanski Šamac, in northern Bosnia, on 22 November. While Šljivančanin held back the convoy, the prisoners were smuggled out of the hospital in buses in another direction. In total, approximately 300 people were taken away from the hospital.

=== Ovčara farm ===
Later on 20 November, Šljivančanin and Colonel Nebojša Pavković informed the press that the JNA would provide buses to transport the wounded out of Vukovar. Instead, at about 10:30, the buses took the prisoners to the JNA barracks on the southern edge of Vukovar, where 15 men were separated from the group and returned to the hospital after being identified as hospital staff. During their stay in the barracks, the Croatian Serb TO and Serbian paramilitaries threatened the prisoners. Croatian Serb leaders opposed moving the prisoners to detention facilities in Serbia, claiming they wished to prosecute them for alleged crimes committed against Serbs. After spending two hours at the barracks, the buses took the prisoners to the Ovčara farm near the village of Grabovo. The group largely consisted of Croats, but also included several ethnic Serbs, Muslims, ethnic Hungarians, ethnic Pannonian Rusyns and Ukrainians, the French national Nicolier, and one German national who fought in defence of Vukovar. It also included Rašeta's nephew, who worked at the Vukovar hospital pharmacy at the time. The group taken to Ovčara consisted of 261 people. Sources disagree as to whether the group included one, or two women, one of whom was five months pregnant. The age of the prisoners ranged from 16 to 72. The youngest among them was 16-year-old Igor Kačić.

==== Igor Kačić ====
On November 20, 1991, two days after the fall of Vukovar, Kačić, his mother, and sisters came out of the make-shift shelter of the Vukovar hospital basement with other refugees under orders of the Yugoslav People's Army and local Serb forces. Outside, Veselin Šljivančanin, officer of the Yugoslav People's Army, was standing at the door separating the men from women and children. He pointed to Kačić, who was a tall and strong young man, and he put him among the men, saying: "You over there!". Igor Kačić's mother asked Šljivančanin "Why him, he's just a kid?" as she showed him Igor's health card with the date of his birth. Šljivančanin replied: "We'll check everything." That was the last time his mother and sisters saw Kačić. He was killed at Ovčara the same day.

=== Massacre ===
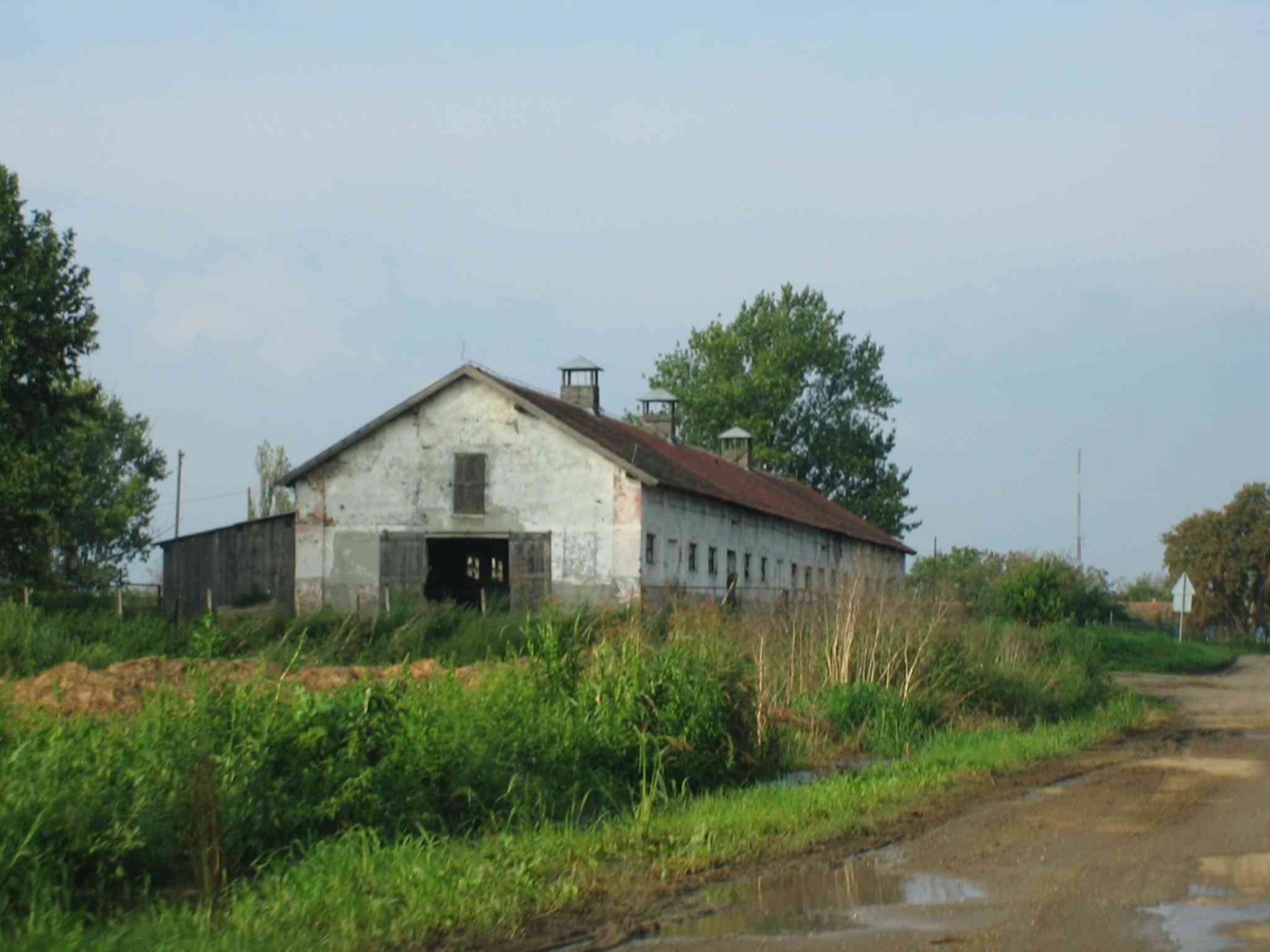
The Ovčara farm in 2005, prior to the opening of the Ovčara Memorial Centre

The prisoners were forced onto buses. Once they reached Ovčara, ten kilometres (six miles) away from Vukovar, the captives were ordered from the buses one-by-one and forced to run the gauntlet past dozens of JNA troops and Serb paramilitaries towards a farm storage building. Slavko Dokmanović, a former mayor of Vukovar, was one of the armed men involved in beating prisoners. As the captives were beaten, they were also stripped of their personal belongings, money and jewelry. Over the course of the day, the JNA military police failed to prevent soldiers of the Croatian Serb TO and Serbian paramilitaries from beating the prisoners in the storage building. They were beaten using sticks, rifle butts, chains, baseball bats, and in one instance a wounded prisoner was beaten with his own crutches. By sundown, at least two men were beaten to death. In addition, one of the captors shot five prisoners, including one Frenchman, who is presumed to be Nicolier. Seven or eight men were returned to Vukovar on orders of the JNA, presumably released at the intervention of their Serb neighbours. Ultimately, Mrkšić ordered the JNA military police to withdraw from the farm, leaving the prisoners in the custody of a Croatian Serb TO unit led by Miroljub Vujović, commander of the Croatian Serb TO in Vukovar, and the Leva Supoderica paramilitary unit. Leva Supoderica was a volunteer unit set up by the Serbian Radical Party (Serbo-Croatian: Srpska radikalna stranka; SRS) in Šid, Serbia, and subordinated to the JNA's 1st Guards Mechanised Brigade.

At about 18:00, the prisoners were divided into groups. Each group of 10 to 20 was loaded onto a truck and transported several hundred metres (yards) from the building towards a wooded ravine. When the prisoners reached the previously prepared execution site, they were shot and buried in a mass grave using a bulldozer. After 15–20 minutes, the truck would return empty to pick up the next group. The final group of prisoners was executed just outside the farm building itself. By 22:00 that evening, all of the prisoners had been killed. Most sources place the number of victims at around 260. This figure has been used by ICTY prosecutors. Some estimates of the death toll go as high as 264. The Croatian authorities believe that the total figure stands at 261.

== Aftermath ==
Croatian Serb forces turned Ovčara into a prison camp in early October 1991. Aside from the massacre, 3,000–4,000 male prisoners were temporarily held in the Ovčara camp at some point during autumn of 1991 before being transported to the prison in Sremska Mitrovica or to the local JNA barracks, which was the transit point for Serbian detention camps such as Stajićevo and Begejci. Following a series of political agreements concluded in 1991 and a ceasefire between the JNA and Croatia in early 1992, the United Nations Protection Force (UNPROFOR) was deployed for peacekeeping in certain parts of Croatia, including Vukovar and its surroundings. It began its deployment in March 1992.

=== Discovery of the mass grave ===
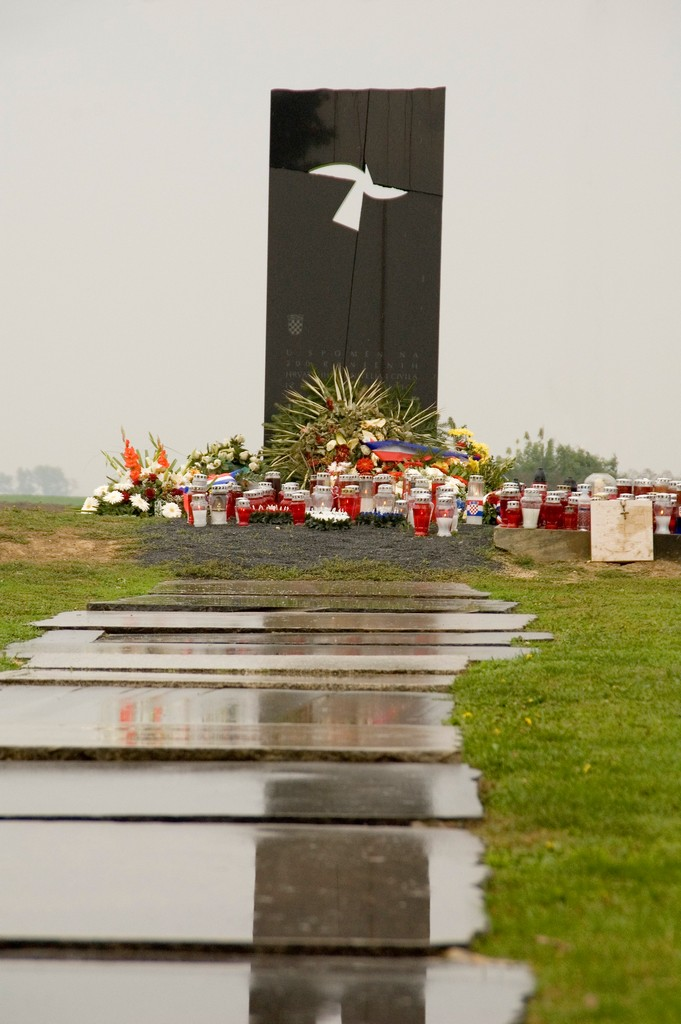
A black marble monument has marked the site of the Ovčara mass grave since 1998.

Forensic anthropologist Clyde Snow learned of the massacre during his visit to Zagreb in October 1992. Snow travelled there as a United Nations (UN) team member sent to investigate reports of war crimes. In a meeting Snow had with the dean of the Zagreb University School of Medicine, he was introduced to a former soldier who claimed to have survived the massacre and told Snow where it took place. Three days later, Snow went to Vukovar and drove to Ovčara accompanied by Royal Canadian Mounted Police Sergeant Larry Moore who was deployed to the region with the UNPROFOR. At the site, Moore spotted a human skull in the mud. A few days later, the UN declared the site a crime scene and deployed Russian UNPROFOR troops to guard it.

Snow put together a four-man team including himself to conduct a preliminary investigation of the site before the winter, and the team arrived at the site in December 1992. They examined the site still under guard by the Russian troops, excavated the skull spotted by Moore and the rest of the body, as well as another set of partially covered remains. The team excavated a one metre (3.3 feet) trench across the site. That allowed them to detect a few more bodies and infer the size of the grave. The information they obtained led Snow to conclude that the grave may contain more than two hundred bodies. The investigators also found spent cartridges consistent with standard Yugoslav-built AK-47s on one side of the grave and bullet holes in trees on the opposite side, leading them to conclude that a firing squad had stood on one side of the pit and fired across or into it.

Croatian authorities launched initiatives to exhume the bodies buried at Ovčara in 1993 and 1994, but those were unsuccessful. A five-member Commission of Experts appointed by the UN Secretary General came to Ovčara to exhume the victims in October 1993. However, they were prevented from carrying out their work by the local Croatian Serb administration. After the Croatian Serb authorities blocked several attempts to further investigate the mass grave at Ovčara, still under constant guard by the Russian peacekeepers, the site was visited by then-U.S. Ambassador to the UN Madeleine Albright in January 1994. She used the occasion to stress U.S. support for the International Criminal Tribunal for the former Yugoslavia (ICTY), which had been set up in 1993.

=== Exhumation ===
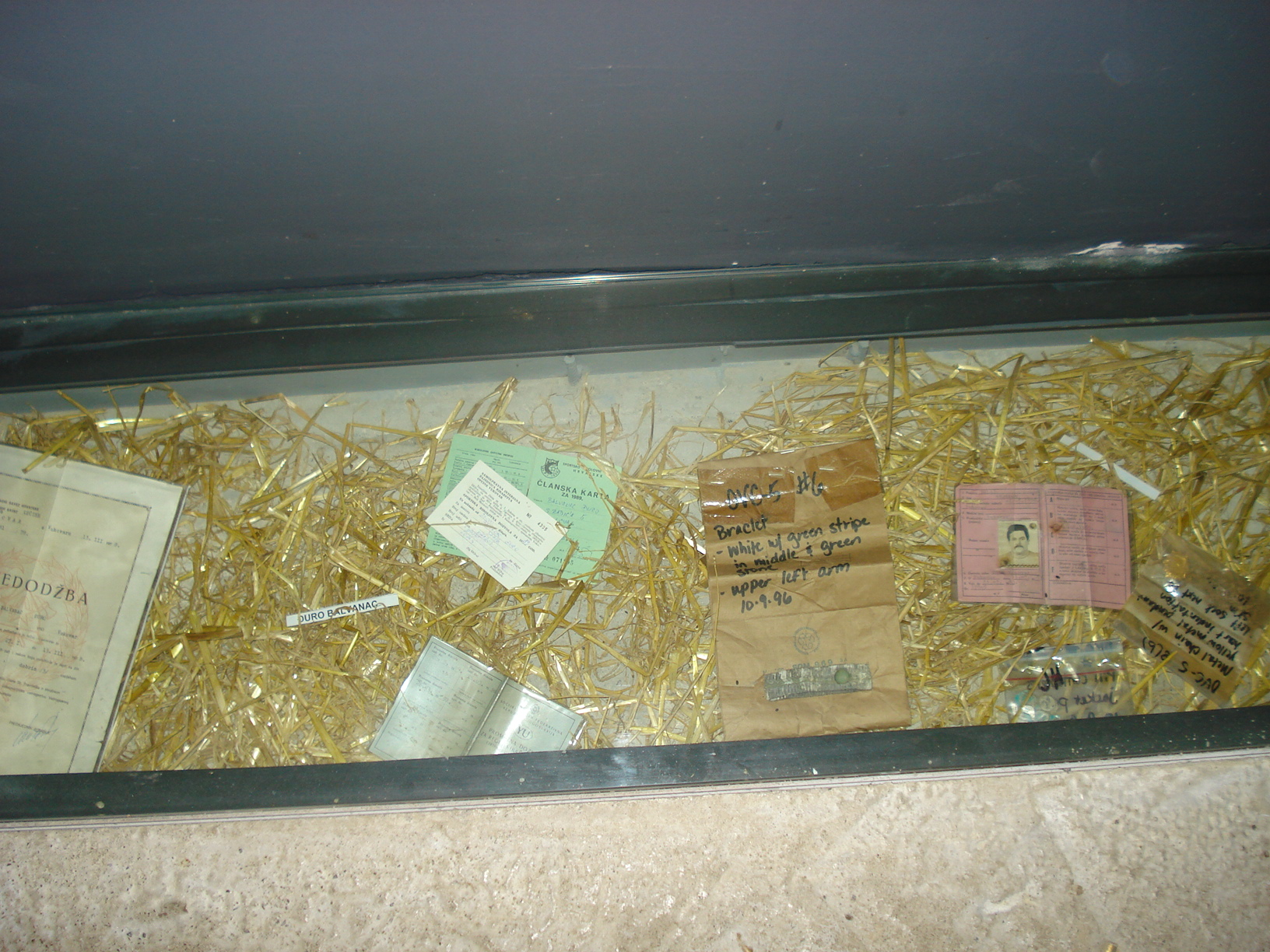
Documents and personal belongings of the victims displayed at the Ovčara Memorial Centre

The political situation in the area did not change until 1995. That year, Croatia militarily defeated the Croatian Serbs in offensives codenamed Flash and Storm, in May and August respectively. That left eastern Slavonia as the last remaining Croatian Serb-held area. Gradual restoration of the area to Croatian rule was agreed upon in November through the Erdut Agreement, and the United Nations Transitional Administration for Eastern Slavonia, Baranja and Western Sirmium (UNTAES) peacekeeping mission was deployed to implement the agreement.

The exhumation of the remains at Ovčara began on 1 September 1996 while the site was still under the constant guard of peacekeepers. The exhumation was conducted by ICTY personnel and the Physicians for Human Rights, with Croatian observers at the site. The excavation works uncovered a mass grave encompassing approximately 30 square metres (320 square feet) and containing a heap of intertwined bodies. Most of the bodies exhibited evidence of multiple gunshot wounds. By 24 October, 200 sets of remains were recovered from the grave. The remains were transported for forensic examination to the Zagreb University School of Medicine. In the four years preceding the exhumation, Croatian authorities collected ante-mortem information on presumed victims, built a modern morgue at the School of Medicine and trained geneticists in DNA analysis to allow for the identification of those who could not be identified by ICTY investigators using traditional methods. By October 2002, 184 victims were identified, largely using DNA analyses, and the figure was increased to 194 by 2010. Glavašević's remains were among those exhumed at Ovčara.

Croatian authorities suspect that a further 61 individuals killed at Ovčara were buried there as well. They suspect one or more additional mass graves exist in the general area, or that the bodies originally buried at the site were moved to a secondary grave. Nevenka Nekić, the Croatian author of a book on Nicolier, claims that an additional shallow grave was excavated at Ovčara in November 1991 and that Nicolier and 60 others were buried there. According to her, they were exhumed by Croatian Serb authorities and moved to a secondary location in early 1992 because the grave was so shallow that body parts protruded through the ground surface.

Since the beginning of 2026, trial excavations have been conducted in search of people considered missing at the Jakobovac location near Ovčara, using ground-penetrating radar and teams of guides and search dogs of the Croatian Mountain Rescue Service (HGSS).

Corpses of Croatian soldiers Ivan Senčić (27) and Zvonimir Miljak (41), found in Grabovo - Ovčara mass grave, were exhumed and identified at the Faculty of Medicine in Zagreb on 18 February 2026; Miljak was buried at the Vukovar Memorial Cemetery on 27 February 2026.

=== War crime trials ===
In November 1995, the ICTY indicted Mrkšić, Šljivančanin and JNA captain Miroslav Radić for war crimes related to the Ovčara massacre. The group was subsequently termed the "Vukovar three" by the media. The ICTY also charged Dokmanović, mayor of Vukovar at the time, with war crimes in connection with the massacre in a sealed indictment in March 1996. He was arrested by UNTAES troops in Operation Little Flower and transferred to the ICTY via Čepin Airfield on 27 June 1997. The operation was the first arrest of a person indicted by the ICTY by any UN force in the former Yugoslavia. Dokmanović's trial never produced a verdict, however. He hanged himself in his ICTY prison cell on 28 June 1998, several days before a verdict was to be announced. The ICTY also linked Serb warlord Željko Ražnatović and his paramilitary formations to the massacre, but he was assassinated in Belgrade before he could be brought to trial.

Mrkšić surrendered to the ICTY in the Netherlands in May 2002. Radić and Šljivančanin were arrested in Serbia in May and June 2003 respectively. The arrests were made shortly before the expiration of a deadline set by the U.S. Congress linking financial assistance to Serbia to its cooperation with the ICTY. In 2007, the ICTY convicted Mrkšić and Šljivančanin, but acquitted Radić. Mrkšić received a 20-year prison sentence, while Šljivančanin was sentenced to five years in prison. In 2009, Šljivančanin's sentence was increased to 17 years in prison on appeal and finally reduced to ten years following a review of the judgment in 2010.

The ICTY also indicted Milošević, as well as Jovica Stanišić and Franko Simatović of the Serbian State Security Service, Croatian Serb political leader Goran Hadžić and the leader of the Serbian Radical Party Vojislav Šešelj for various war crimes, including those committed in Vukovar. Milošević's trial ended without any verdict upon his death in March 2006, while the Vukovar-related charges against Stanišić and Simatović were dropped from their indictments even before the pair were acquitted on all counts in 2013. In March 2016, Šešelj was acquitted on all counts, pending appeal. In 2018, he was convicted of hate speech for inciting the deportation of Croats from Hrtkovci in 1992, and sentenced to ten years imprisonment, but acquitted on all other counts, including those pertaining to Vukovar. Hadžić died of cancer in July 2016, before his trial could be completed.

As of 2015, Serbian authorities have convicted 15 people in connection with the Ovčara massacre. In 2010, Vujović and Stanko Vujanović (deputy commander of Croatian Serb TO in Vukovar) were convicted and sentenced to 20 years in prison along with eleven others, all of them former members of the Croatian Serb TO or Leva Supoderica. Predrag Milojević, Đorđe Šošić, Miroslav Đanković and Saša Radak were sentenced to 20 years in prison, Milan Vojnović and Ivan Antonijević were sentenced to 15 years in prison, Jovica Perić was sentenced to 13 years, Nada Kalaba was sentenced to 11 years, Milan Lančužanin was sentenced to seven, and Predrag Dragović and Goran Mugoša were given five-year prison sentences. In December 2013, these convictions were set aside by the Constitutional Court of Serbia and the case was returned to the Court of Appeals for a new trial. In February 2015, Vujović, Vujanović, Milojević, Radak, Šošić and Đanković were released from custody based on a decision of the Supreme Court of Cassation pending a retrial by the Court of Appeals. In a separate trial completed in 2014, Serbian authorities convicted and sentenced Petar Ćirić to 15 years in prison for participating in the massacre as a member of Leva Supoderica. In February 2015, the International Court of Justice (ICJ) ruled that the siege and ensuing massacre did not constitute genocide, though it confirmed that serious crimes had taken place.

=== Commemoration ===
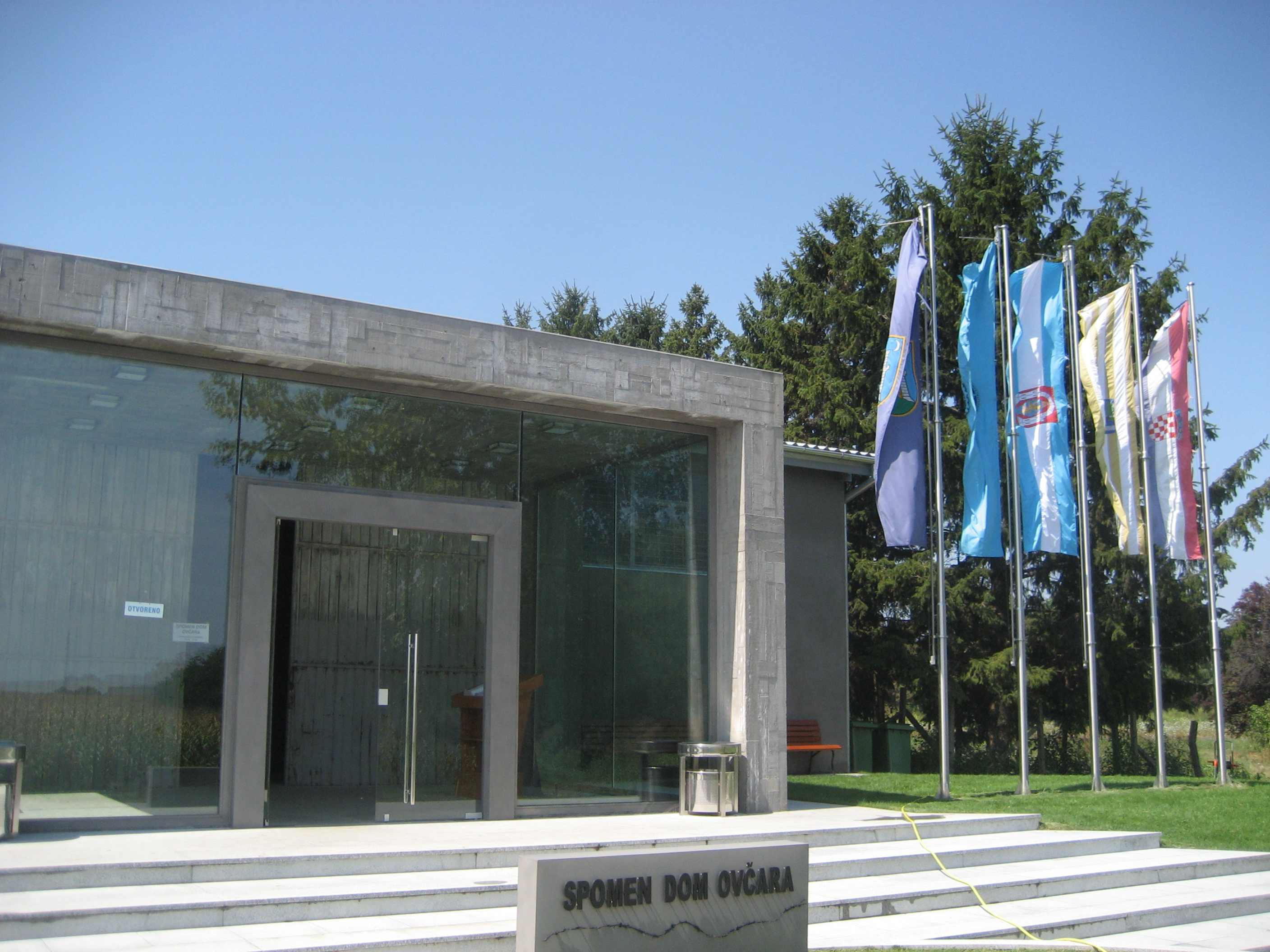
By 2014, the Ovčara Memorial Centre had received about 500,000 visitors

Since 1998, the victims of the Battle of Vukovar and the events that occurred in its immediate aftermath are commemorated annually on 18 November by a procession starting at the Vukovar hospital and reaching the city's memorial cemetery. In 2014, the event drew 80,000 participants. The Day of Remembrance of the Victims of Vukovar became a national public holiday in 2020. A monument sculpted by Slavomir Drinković that marks the site of the mass grave at Ovčara was unveiled on 30 December 1998. Monuments of the same design have subsequently been used to mark all the other mass graves from the Croatian War of Independence. The massacre itself has come to be referred to as the Vukovar massacre, the Ovčara massacre, or the Vukovar hospital massacre. It was by far the largest massacre committed during the Croatian War of Independence.

In 2006, the Ovčara Memorial Centre, designed by Miljenko Romić, opened at the site of the former Ovčara farm. The centre opened in a remodeled storage building where prisoners were held on 20 November 1991 before they were executed. The dim interior of the building, accessed through a glass-encased foyer, features illuminated photographs of 200 victims exhumed from the mass grave and the 61 missing who were executed at Ovčara. The concrete floor contains encased spent cartridges and the Spiral of Evil (Croatian: Spirala zla) sculpture displaying the names of 261 victims. The ceiling contains 261 lighting fixtures symbolising the number of victims. The centre also contains an exhibition of personal belongings and documents found in the mass grave. The completion of the centre was funded by the City of Zagreb at the cost of 2 million kuna (c. 270,000 euro). By July 2014, the centre was visited by about 500,000 people. In the same year, Croatia launched an education programme which entails visits to the centre by eighth-grade pupils, and 50,000 pupils are scheduled to visit the centre annually. In 2010, Serbian President Boris Tadić visited the memorial centre and the mass grave site, as the first Serbian head of state to do so. He laid wreaths at the site and apologized on behalf of the Serbian state.

Several victims of the massacre are honoured individually in Vukovar. There is a monument honouring Kačić together with his father who was killed on 2 October 1991 during the Battle of Vukovar, a bridge in the city is named after Nicolier, and one of the city's schools is named after Glavašević.

== See also ==
- List of massacres in Croatia
- Velepromet camp

== Sources ==
Books

- Armatta, Judith (2010). Twilight of Impunity: The War Crimes Trial of Slobodan Milosevic. Durham, North Carolina: Duke University Press. ISBN 978-0-8223-4746-0.
- Bideleux, Robert; Jeffries, Ian (2007). The Balkans: A Post-Communist History. London, England: Routledge. ISBN 9781134583287.
- Cassese, Antonio, ed. (2009). The Oxford Companion to International Criminal Justice. Oxford, England: Oxford University Press. ISBN 9780191553448.
- Cencich, John R. (2013). The Devil's Garden: A War Crimes Investigator's Story. Lincoln, Nebraska: Potomac Books. ISBN 9781612341729.
- Central Intelligence Agency, Office of Russian and European Analysis (2002). Balkan Battlegrounds: A Military History of the Yugoslav Conflict, 1990–1995. Washington, D.C.: Central Intelligence Agency. ISBN 9780160664724. OCLC 50396958.
- Clark, Janine Natalya (2014). International Trials and Reconciliation: Assessing the Impact of the International Criminal Tribunal for the Former Yugoslavia. London, England: Routledge. ISBN 9781317974758.
- Eastern Europe and the Commonwealth of Independent States. London, England: Routledge. 1999. ISBN 978-1-85743-058-5.
- Gow, James (2003). The Serbian Project and Its Adversaries: A Strategy of War Crimes. London, England: C. Hurst & Co. ISBN 9781850656463.
- Hoare, Marko Attila (2005). "Crime and the Economy in Serbia after Milošević". In Ramet, Sabrina P. (ed.). Serbia Since 1989: Politics and Society under Milošević and After. Seattle, Washington: University of Washington Press. pp. 212–226. ISBN 9780295802077.
- Hoare, Marko Attila (2010). "The War of Yugoslav Succession". In Ramet, Sabrina P. (ed.). Central and Southeast European Politics Since 1989. Cambridge, England: Cambridge University Press. pp. 111–136. ISBN 978-1-139-48750-4.
- Horton, Richard C. (2003). Second Opinion: Doctors, Diseases and Decisions in Modern Medicine. London: Granta Books. ISBN 978-1-86207-587-0.
- Kurspahić, Kemal (2003). Prime Time Crime: Balkan Media in War and Peace. Washington, D.C.: US Institute of Peace Press. ISBN 978-1-929223-39-8.
- Ramet, Sabrina P. (2006). The Three Yugoslavias: State-Building And Legitimation, 1918–2006. Bloomington, Indiana: Indiana University Press. ISBN 978-0-253-34656-8.
- Ramet, Sabrina P.; Matić, Davorka (2007). Democratic Transition in Croatia: Value Transformation, Education & Media. College Station, Texas: Texas A&M University Press. ISBN 978-1-58544-587-5.
- Stover, Eric; Peress, Gilles (1998). The Graves: Srebrenica and Vukovar. Zurich, Switzerland: Scalo. ISBN 9783931141769.
- Stover, Eric; Weinstein, Harvey M (2004). My Neighbor, My Enemy: Justice and Community in the Aftermath of Mass Atrocity. Cambridge, England: Cambridge University Press. ISBN 978-0-521-54264-7.
- Stover, Eric (2011). The Witnesses: War Crimes and the Promise of Justice in The Hague. Philadelphia, Pennsylvania: University of Pennsylvania Press. ISBN 9780812203783.
- Trbovich, Ana S. (2008). A Legal Geography of Yugoslavia's Disintegration. Oxford, England: Oxford University Press. ISBN 9780195333435.
- Woodward, Susan L. (1995). Balkan Tragedy: Chaos and Dissolution after the Cold War. Washington, D.C.: Brookings Institution Press. ISBN 9780815722953.

Scientific journal articles

- Klein, Jacques Paul; Jones, David Sterling; McDowell, Paul J. (1 April 1998). "Operation Little Flower: The United Nations' apprehension of an indicted war criminal". Military Intelligence Professional Bulletin. Fort Huachuca, Arizona: United States Army Intelligence Center. ISSN 0026-4024. Archived from the original on 2015-04-02 – via HighBeam Research.
- Lončar, Marko (May 2010). "Činjenice o "Optužnici" koju je pročitao Siniša Glavašević" [Facts on the "Indictment" Read by Siniša Glavašević]. National Security and the Future (in Croatian). 11 (2–3). Zagreb, Croatia: St. George Association: 9–60. ISSN 1332-4454.
- Marijan, Davor (November 2012). "Zamisao i propast napadne operacije Jugoslavenske narodne armije na Hrvatsku u rujnu 1991. godine" [The Conception and Failure of the Offensive Operation of the Yugoslav National Army in September 1991]. Journal of Contemporary History (in Croatian). 44 (2). Croatian Institute of History: 251–275. ISSN 0590-9597.

News reports

- Bell, Martin (22 August 2011). Return to Vukovar (Radio broadcast). BBC Radio 4.
- Bijelić, N. (27 September 2004). "Štuka se hvalio da je streljao" [Štuka Boasted about Shootings]. Večernje novosti (in Serbian). Belgrade, Serbia.
- Biluš, Marina (19 June 2007). "Slavomir Drinković – kipar patriot na čelu stoljetne akademije" [Slavomir Drinković – Patriot Sculptor Heads Century-old Academy]. Nacional (in Croatian). Zagreb, Croatia.
- "Bio je književnik i novinar, a postao je simbol Vukovara" [He was a Writer and a Journalist, and Became a Symbol of Vukovar] (in Croatian). Zagreb, Croatia: Nova TV (Croatia). HINA. 4 November 2014.
- Blair, David (3 February 2015). "International Court of Justice clears Croatia and Serbia of genocide". The Daily Telegraph. London, England.
- "Bodies Link Officers To Croat Executions". The New York Times. New York City. 24 October 1996. Archived from the original on 2015-05-26.
- Borovac, Marina (18 November 2012). "Igor je u džepu nosio igračke, a na ramenu pušku" [Igor carried toys in his pocket and a rifle on his shoulder]. Večernji list (in Croatian). Zagreb, Croatia.
- Borovac, Marina (18 November 2014). "Dvaput smo bili na identifikaciji žrtava Ovčare, ali..." [We Went to Ovčara Victims' Identification Twice, but...]. Večernji list (in Croatian). Zagreb, Croatia.
- Bradarić, Branimir (20 November 2010). "Susretom "Grad - to ste vi" zaključen Dan sjećanja" [Meeting "City - It Is You" Concludes the Day of Remembrance]. Večernji list (in Croatian). Zagreb, Croatia.
- Bradarić, Branimir (18 November 2012). "Otkriven spomenik za legendu obrane i najmlađu žrtvu Ovčare" [Monument to a Defence Legend and the Youngest Victim of Ovčara Unveiled]. Večernji list (in Croatian). Zagreb, Croatia.
- Bradarić, Branimir (18 October 2014). "Pješački most u Vukovaru ponio ime po francuskom dragovoljcu Jean-Michelu Nicolieru" [Pedestrian Bridge in Vukovar Named After French Volunteer Jean-Michel Nicolier]. Večernji list (in Croatian). Zagreb, Croatia.
- Bradarić, Branimir (31 October 2014). "Matić s učenicima u Vukovaru: Istina o ratu je jedna jedina" [Matić With Pupils in Vukovar: There is a Single Truth about the War]. Večernji list (in Croatian). Zagreb, Croatia.
- Butigan, Sanja (23 November 2006). "Spomen-dom Ovčara: Svi imaju isti datum smrti" [Ovčara Memorial Centre: Everyone's Date of Death is the Same]. Jutarnji list (in Croatian). Zagreb, Croatia.
- Butigan, Sanja (18 November 2014). "Vukovar je zaslužio mir i dostojanstvo - jedinstvena je poruka sudionika Dana sjećanja" [Vukovar Deserves Peace and Dignity - Single Message of those Attending the Remembrance Day]. Glas Slavonije (in Croatian). Zagreb, Croatia. Archived from the original on 2019-03-31.
- Chenu, Georges-Marie (18 November 1995). "18 novembre 1991, la chute de Vukovar" [18 November 1991, Fall of Vukovar]. Le Monde (in French). Paris, France.
- Derikonjić, Miroslava (14 December 2013). "Ustavni sud ukinuo presudu za Ovčaru" [Constitutional Court Sets Aside Ovčara Judgment]. Politika (in Serbian). Belgrade, Serbia.
- Derikonjić, Miroslava (14 February 2015). "Okrivljeni za zločin na "Ovčari" na slobodi posle 12 godina" [Accused for Ovčara Crime Released after 12 Years]. Politika (in Serbian). Belgrade, Serbia.
- Engelberg, Stephen (3 March 1991). "Belgrade Sends Troops to Croatia Town". The New York Times. New York City. Archived from the original on 2013-10-02.
- Flego, Miroslav (7 July 2014). "Ovčaru i Memorijalno groblje posjetilo oko pola milijuna turista" [Ovčara and the Memorial Cemetery Visited by about Half a Million Tourists]. Večernji list (in Croatian). Zagreb, Croatia.
- "Mjesta stradanja ratne '91. godine" [Places of Suffering in Wartime Year of 1991]. Glas Slavonije (in Croatian). Osijek, Croatia. 17 November 2012.
- "Goran Hadzic, Croatian-Serb war crimes defendant, dies at 57". London, England: BBC News. 12 July 2016.
- Harden, Blaine (26 January 1993). "Serbs Accused of '91 Croatia Massacre; U.S. Doctors Believe 200 Wounded Men Were Taken From Hospital and Shot". The Washington Post. Washington, D.C. Archived from the original on 2015-09-24 – via HighBeam Research.
- Hudson, Alexandra (25 September 2007). "U.N. Tribunal to Rule in Vukovar Massacre Case". London, England: Reuters.
- "Identificirano devet žrtava iz Domovinskog rata" [Nine victims from the Homeland War identified]. branitelji.gov.hr (in Croatian). Ministry of Croatian defenders. 18 February 2026.
- Ivanković, Davor (18 November 2010). "Na Ovčari su ubijeni i Srbi, ali i francuski i njemački dobrovoljci" [Serbs were Also Killed at Ovčara, as well as French and German Volunteers]. Večernji list (in Croatian).
- Kovacevic, Tamara (9 March 2004). "Profile: The 'Vukovar Three'". London, England: BBC News.
- LeBor, Adam (28 September 2007). "Serb Officer is Jailed over the Massacre of 194 Croats Snatched from Hospital". The Times. London, England.
- Lisjak, Tatjana (25 November 2014). "Petar Ćirić osuđen na 15 godina robije za mučenja i ubojstva na Ovčari" [Petar Ćirić Sentenced to 15 Years in Prison for Torture and Murders at Ovčara]. Večernji list (in Croatian). Zagreb, Croatia.
- Little, Alan (13 March 2004). "Vukovar massacre haunts Serbs: Serbia is still in denial about the crimes that were committed in its name". London, England: BBC News.
- Little, Alan (23 June 2011). "Croatia Vukovar War: Overcoming a Legacy of War". London, England: BBC News.
- Marjanović, Vedran (19 January 2014). "Ivan Grujić: Vojska Jugoslavije prebacila je 1995. ostatke nestalih Hrvata u grobnice po Srbiji" [Ivan Grujić: Yugoslav Army Transferred Remains of Missing Croats to Graves in Serbia in 1995]. Slobodna Dalmacija (in Croatian). Split, Croatia.
- "Na Ovčari otkriveno spomen-obilježje žrtvama srpske agresije" [Memorial to Victims of Serb Aggression Unveiled at Ovčara] (in Croatian). Zagreb, Croatia: Croatian Radiotelevision. 30 December 1998.
- "Na srpskom likvidirati ne znači streljati" [Liquidate in Serbian Does not Mean to Shoot]. Politika (in Serbian). Belgrade, Serbia. 15 January 2008.
- Ottaway, David B. (7 January 1994). "UN Envoy Demands Probe Of Mass Grave in Croatia". Chicago Sun-Times. Chicago, Illinois. Archived from the original on 2015-04-02 – via HighBeam Research.
- "Osnovna škola u Vukovaru nosi ime Siniše Glavaševića" [Elementary School in Vukovar Named After Siniša Glavašević] (in Croatian). Zagreb, Croatia: Index.hr. 5 November 2007.
- Partos, Gabriel (13 June 2003). "Vukovar Massacre: What Happened". London, England: BBC News.
- Pavelić, Boris. "Let the Tragedy Speak for Itself". Belgrade, Serbia: B92.
- Perić, Zrinka; Gurov, Daniel (9 March 2026). "Proširuje se područje potrage za nestalima iz Domovinskog rata" [The search area for missing persons from the Homeland War is expanding]. vijesti.hrt.hr. Croatian Radiotelevision (HRT).
- Perlez, Jane (5 January 1996). "In Montenegro, an Indicted Soldier Is Still a Hero". The New York Times. New York City.
- "Pokopani hrvatski branitelji Stjepan Boni i Zvonimir Miljak" [Croatian defenders Stjepan Boni and Zvonimir Miljak buried]. vijesti.hrt.hr (in Croatian). Croatian Radiotelevision (HRT). 27 February 2026.
- "Petru Ćiriću 15 godina zatvora za zločin na Ovčari" [Petar Ćirić Receives 15 Years in Prison for the Crime at Ovčara]. Politika (in Serbian). Belgrade, Serbia. Tanjug. 1 July 2013.
- Rašović, Renata (3 June 2012). "Priča o dragovoljcu u tuđini koji nema grob" [Story of Volunteer in a Foreign Country Who Has no Grave]. Večernji list (in Croatian). Zagreb, Croatia.
- "Roads Sealed as Yugoslav Unrest Mounts". The New York Times. New York City. Reuters. 19 August 1990. ISSN 0362-4331.
- Vladisavljevic, Anja (18 November 2020). "Croatia Commemorates 29th Anniversary of Fall of Vukovar". Balkan Insight.
- "Serb leader Tadic apologises for 1991 Vukovar massacre". London, England: BBC News. 4 November 2010.
- "Serbia radical Vojislav Seselj acquitted of Balkan war crimes". London, England: BBC News. 31 March 2016.
- Sudetic, Chuck (2 April 1991). "Rebel Serbs Complicate Rift on Yugoslav Unity". The New York Times. New York City. Archived from the original on 2013-10-02.
- Tagirov, Tatjana (8 July 2004). "Oni ne bi ni mrava zgazili" [They Wouldn't Hurt an Ant]. Vreme (in Serbian). No. 705. Belgrade, Serbia.
- "UN court dismisses Croatia and Serbia genocide claims". BBC News. London, England. 3 February 2015.
- "UN appeal court convicts Serb radical Seselj of war crimes". BBC News. London, England. 11 April 2018.
- "Vesna Bosanac: Iz bolnice su odovodili civile i ranjenike kojima se potom izgubio svaki trag" [Vesna Bosanac: They Took Civilians and Wounded from the Hospital who were Never Seen Again]. Novi list (in Croatian). Rijeka, Croatia. HINA. 9 April 2013.
- Vuković, Vinko (3 October 2012). "Priča o hrvatskom domoljubu Jeanu Michelu Nicolieru, mučki likvidiranom na Ovčari, zaslužuje da ode u svijet" [Story of Croatian Patriot Jean Michel Nicolier, Brutally Killed at Ovčara, Deserves to be Heard Throughout the World]. Slobodna Dalmacija (in Croatian). Split, Croatia.
- "Vukovar: Muzej u bolnici" [Vukovar: Museum in Hospital] (in Croatian). Zagreb, Croatia: Nova TV (Croatia). HINA. 17 November 2006.
- Wood, Paul (15 January 2000). "Gangster's life of Serb warlord". London, England: BBC News.

Other sources

- Boutros-Ghali, Boutros (27 May 1994). "Letter Dated 24 May 1994 from the Secretary-General to the President of the Security Council" (PDF). United Nations.
- Nazor, Ante (March 2011). "Vukovar i vukovarska bolnica (dijelovi kronologije), studeni 1991. (IV. dio)" [Vukovar and Vukovar Hospital (Parts of the Chronology), November 1991 (Part 4)]. Hrvatski vojnik (in Croatian) (334). Ministry of Defence (Croatia). ISSN 1333-9036. Archived from the original on 2015-04-02.
- "The Prosecutor of the Tribunal Against Goran Hadžić, First Amended Indictment" (PDF). International Criminal Tribunal for the former Yugoslavia. 22 July 2011.
- "Report Of The Secretary-General on the United Nations Transitional Administration for Eastern Slavonia, Baranja and Western Sirmium" (PDF). United Nations. 1 October 1996. Archived from the original (PDF) on 2015-04-02.
- "Brief Chronology 15 January 1996 – 15 January 1998". United Nations. Archived from the original on 2018-06-14.
