= Nicollier =

Nicollier may refer to:

- 14826 Nicollier, a main-belt asteroid
- Claude Nicollier, Swiss astronaut
- Jean-Michel Nicollier, French-Croatian soldier
- Henri Nicollier, French aircraft manufacturer
