= Ovčara =

Ovčara may refer to:

- Ovčara, Vukovar-Syrmia County, a hamlet near Vukovar, Croatia, the location of the 1991 Vukovar massacre
- Ovčara, Čepin, a former village now part of Čepin, Osijek-Baranja County, Croatia
- Ovčara, Levanjska Varoš, a village near Levanjska Varoš, Osijek-Baranja County, Croatia
- Ovčara Suhopoljska, a former village now part of Suhopolje, Croatia
