= Velepromet camp =

Detention facility during the Croatian War of Independence

- Detention camp
- Location within Croatia
- Coordinates: 45°19′58″N 19°0′8″E
- Location: Vukovar, Croatia
- Operated by: Croatian Serb Territorial Defence, Yugoslav People's Army
- Original use: Storage facility
- Operational: November 1991 – March 1992
- Inmates: Croatian civilians, prisoners of war
- Number of inmates: Up to 10,000
- Killed: Numbers greatly vary: At least 15 (ICTY and ICJ); c. 350 (Croatian Government estimate); Up to 800 (survivor accounts)

The Velepromet camp was a detention facility established in the final days of the Battle of Vukovar during the Croatian War of Independence. The camp was set up by the Yugoslav People's Army (JNA), which shared control of the facility with Croatian Serb rebels. The facility, originally an industrial storage site, was located on the southern outskirts of the city of Vukovar, in close proximity to the JNA barracks. It consisted of eight warehouses surrounded by a wire fence, and was established on 16 November 1991, when the first detainees were brought there.

A few days after the end of the Battle of Vukovar, there were 2,000 detainees in the camp. Detainees usually spent several days in the camp, during which some of them were interrogated, beaten and killed. Up to 10,000 detainees passed through the camp before it was closed in March 1992, when the United Nations Protection Force deployed to the area. Anywhere between 15 and 800 inmates may have been killed at the camp, though the latter figure includes approximately 700 people who are missing and presumed dead. The events in the camp formed part of three indictments issued by the International Criminal Tribunal for the former Yugoslavia. As of 2014, two of the trials are ongoing, while the trial of Slobodan Milošević was terminated following his death.

== Background ==
In 1990, following the electoral defeat of the government of the Socialist Republic of Croatia by the Croatian Democratic Union (Croatian: Hrvatska demokratska zajednica, HDZ), ethnic tensions between Croats and Serbs worsened. The Yugoslav People's Army (Jugoslovenska narodna armija – JNA) confiscated the weapons of Croatia's Territorial Defence (Teritorijalna obrana - TO) forces to minimize resistance. On 17 August, tensions escalated into an open revolt by Croatian Serbs, centred on the predominantly Serb-populated areas of the Dalmatian hinterland around Knin, parts of the Lika, Kordun, Banovina and eastern Croatia. This revolt was followed by two unsuccessful attempts by Serbia, supported by Montenegro and Serbia's provinces of Vojvodina and Kosovo, to obtain the approval of the Yugoslav Presidency for a JNA operation to disarm Croatian security forces in January 1991.

After a bloodless skirmish between Serb insurgents and Croatian special police in March, the JNA itself, supported by Serbia and its supporters, asked the Presidency to give it wartime powers and declare a state of emergency. The request was denied on 15 March, and the JNA came under the control of Serbian President Slobodan Milošević. Milošević, preferring a campaign to expand Serbia rather than to preserve Yugoslavia, publicly threatened to replace the JNA with a Serbian army and declared that he no longer recognized the authority of the Presidency. By the end of the month, the conflict had escalated into the Croatian War of Independence. The JNA stepped in, increasingly supporting Croatian Serb insurgents and preventing Croatian police from intervening. In early April, the leaders of the Croatian Serb revolt declared their intention to integrate the area under their control, known as the Serbian Autonomous Oblast of Krajina, with Serbia. The Government of Croatia viewed this declaration as an attempt to secede. In May, the Croatian government responded by forming the Croatian National Guard (Zbor narodne garde - ZNG), but its development was hampered by a United Nations (UN) arms embargo introduced in September. On 8 October, Croatia declared independence from Yugoslavia.

The second half of 1991 saw the fiercest fighting of the war, as the 1991 Yugoslav campaign in Croatia culminated in the Siege of Dubrovnik, and the Battle of Vukovar. The Battle of Vukovar ended on 18 November, when the JNA captured the city after nearly three months of fighting. At the same time, Croatian Serb authorities began systematically expelling non-Serb civilians from areas under their control. The expulsions in the area of eastern Slavonia were primarily motivated by the aim of changing the ethnic composition in favour of Serbs as well as the resettling of Serb refugees who had fled western Slavonia following Operation Swath-10 by the Croatian Army.

== Timeline ==
The Velepromet storage facility is located on the southern edge of Vukovar, in the Sajmište city district, a few hundred metres from the JNA barracks. It consists of eight sheet metal warehouses, surrounded by a wire fence. A brickyard was located just beyond the perimeter fence, 50 metres (160 feet) away. The Velepromet storage facility was turned into a detention camp when the first detainees were brought there on 16 November, during the final days of the Battle of Vukovar, shortly after the JNA captured the Sajmište district. It served as a detention facility where the JNA and various paramilitary groups held Croats before they were transported to prison camps in Serbia or they were executed nearby. The site was within the area of responsibility of the JNA 2nd Assault Detachment, commanded by Major Branislav Lukić, the commanding officer of the JNA garrison in Vukovar, but the camp security was provided by Croatian Serb TO, volunteers and by JNA military police.

After the Battle of Vukovar, the JNA and its allied forces started taking all civilians remaining in Vukovar to the Velepromet camp, transferring them from various shelters elsewhere in the city. About 11:00 on 19 November, Cyrus Vance and Herbert S. Okun toured Vukovar on a United Nations fact-finding mission. They were given an escorted tour of several sites in or near the city, including the Velepromet camp, before departing for Belgrade at 13:00.

According to the International Criminal Tribunal for the former Yugoslavia (ICTY) prosecutor Carla Del Ponte, there were approximately 2,000 people held in the facility on 19 November, including civilians and approximately 800 people detained as prisoners of war by the JNA. Those included several hundred detainees taken from the Vukovar hospital. People transported to the Velepromet camp were then separated based on their ethnicity and suspected ZNG and Croatian police personnel were separated from the others. Colonel Bogdan Vujić of the JNA Counterintelligence Service visited the camp that day and described the conditions there as "inhumane". The International Committee of the Red Cross was denied access to the Velepromet camp.

Upon arrival at the facility, some of the prisoners were selected for beatings or execution. Survivors reported that some of the detainees were escorted to the brickyard, from which shots could be heard, and those detainees were not seen again. One surviving prisoner later reported that he witnessed the killing of one prisoner in the camp itself, when Serbian paramilitaries slit the victim's throat in front of detainees. Other prisoners were beaten during interrogations, were shot and wounded, or were otherwise abused. On 19 November, gradual transfer of the detainees to Sremska Mitrovica prison in Serbia started. These transfers caused a clash between Vujić and the Croatian Serb TO, as the latter wanted to keep the detainees under their control.

Detainees were generally kept in the Velepromet camp for three to four days before being transferred to Sremska Mitrovica. It is estimated that up to 10,000 civilians and prisoners of war passed through the Velepromet camp before the camp was closed down in March 1992, when the United Nations Protection Force deployed to the area. According to survivors, up to 800 were killed there, although a large number of those deaths are unconfirmed and many are considered missing. The figure includes 700 missing and presumed dead as of 2009. Seventeen victims were buried in graves within the detention facility itself. According to the Croatian Government, about 350 inmates did not leave the camp alive. This figure was repeated by Croatian lawyers in March 2014, during the trial phase of the Croatia–Serbia genocide case before the International Court of Justice (ICJ). Serbia's legal team maintained that the figure of 350 killed is exaggerated, but conceded that crimes had been committed in the camp. Based on the findings of the ICTY, the ICJ found that at least 15 inmates had been killed at Velepromet, but stated that it was impossible for the court to determine the exact number of deaths.

== Aftermath ==
The events in the Velepromet camp formed part of three different ICTY indictments, although none resulted in a conviction. In the trial of Slobodan Milošević, the charges brought against Milošević by the ICTY prosecutors included unlawful confinement, imprisonment, torture and inhumane acts against Croat and other non-Serb civilians, including one hundred detainees held in the Velepromet camp. Milošević died before his trial was completed. Vojislav Šešelj, the leader of the Serb Radical Party, associated with the White Eagles paramilitaries, was charged with the unlawful confinement and killing of at least six people at the Velepromet camp who were buried in a mass grave near the site of the Ovčara massacre, near the village of Grabovo south of Vukovar, as well as an unspecified number of people in the brick yard adjacent to the Velepromet camp. He was acquitted of all charges in 2016. Goran Hadžić, a Croatian Serb policial leader in eastern Slavonia, who held the office of President of SAO Eastern Slavonia, Baranja and Western Syrmia, was charged with the unlawful confinement and murder of the 17 people in Velepromet who were later buried within the compound. His trial was abandoned in 2014 as a result of Hadžić being diagnosed with terminal cancer.

The site of the Velepromet camp is marked by a commemorative plaque, and there is a wreath-laying ceremony each November at the site. The compound was restored to is original use as a storage facility.
