= Jean-Michel Nicolier =

French soldier (1966–1991)

- Jean-Michel Nicolier during the Battle of Vukovar in 1991
- Born: 1 July 1966; Vesoul, France
- Died: 20 November 1991 (aged 25); Ovčara, Vukovar, Croatia
- Military career
- Allegiance: Croatia
- Branch: Croatian Defence Forces
- Service years: 1991
- Conflicts: Croatian War of Independence: Battle of Vukovar
- Awards: Order of Nikola Šubić Zrinski

Jean-Michel Nicolier (1 July 1966 – 20 November 1991) was a French military volunteer, who fought for Croatia in the Croatian War of Independence. He participated in the Battle of Vukovar and other battlefields throughout Croatia. He was killed in the Vukovar massacre.

== Early years ==
Nicollier was born on 1 July 1966 in Vesoul, France to his mother Lyliane Fournier. He was the middle child of three brothers; his brothers are Pierre and Paul. In Vesoul he finished elementary and high school. Nicollier watched the Croatian War of Independence on television in France, and decided to travel to Croatia. He told his mother:

I want to help these people, they need me. I have to go, but I'll be back. You know that I'm a wild grass that never goes away.

In July 1991, he boarded the train and arrived in Zagreb completely alone. There he joined the Croatian Defence Forces and was sent off to the front along the Kupa river in Banovina.

== Battle of Vukovar ==
Last known photo of Nicolier, in Vukovar Hospital.

In September 1991, Nicollier arrived in Vukovar with the last volunteers. Nicollier fought across the Vukovar battlefields and was wounded twice in the three months he was there. On 9 November 1991 he was wounded in the leg by a fragmentation grenade, and was transported to the Vukovar Hospital where he was treated for his injuries. Nicollier stayed in the Vukovar hospital until the fall of Vukovar on 18 November 1991.

On 20 November 1991, he was interviewed by a French reporter, Agnes Vahramian, and described his experience in Vukovar as "a slaughterhouse". The same day, he was taken from the hospital by Yugoslav People's Army and paramilitary Serb forces and transported to the Ovčara farm.

At Ovčara, according to later witness testimonies, a man named Kemo took Nicollier from the hangars, at which point he was viciously beaten, and killed by a gunshot to the head by one Spasoje Petković, who then took 20 francs from his pocket. Nicollier's remains were among sixty not subsequently found. It was thought that they were initially disposed of in shallow graves, which caused them to be uncovered by the following spring and then thrown elsewhere, or that they were thrown into the Danube. Nicolier's remains were discovered and identified in 2025.

== Legacy ==
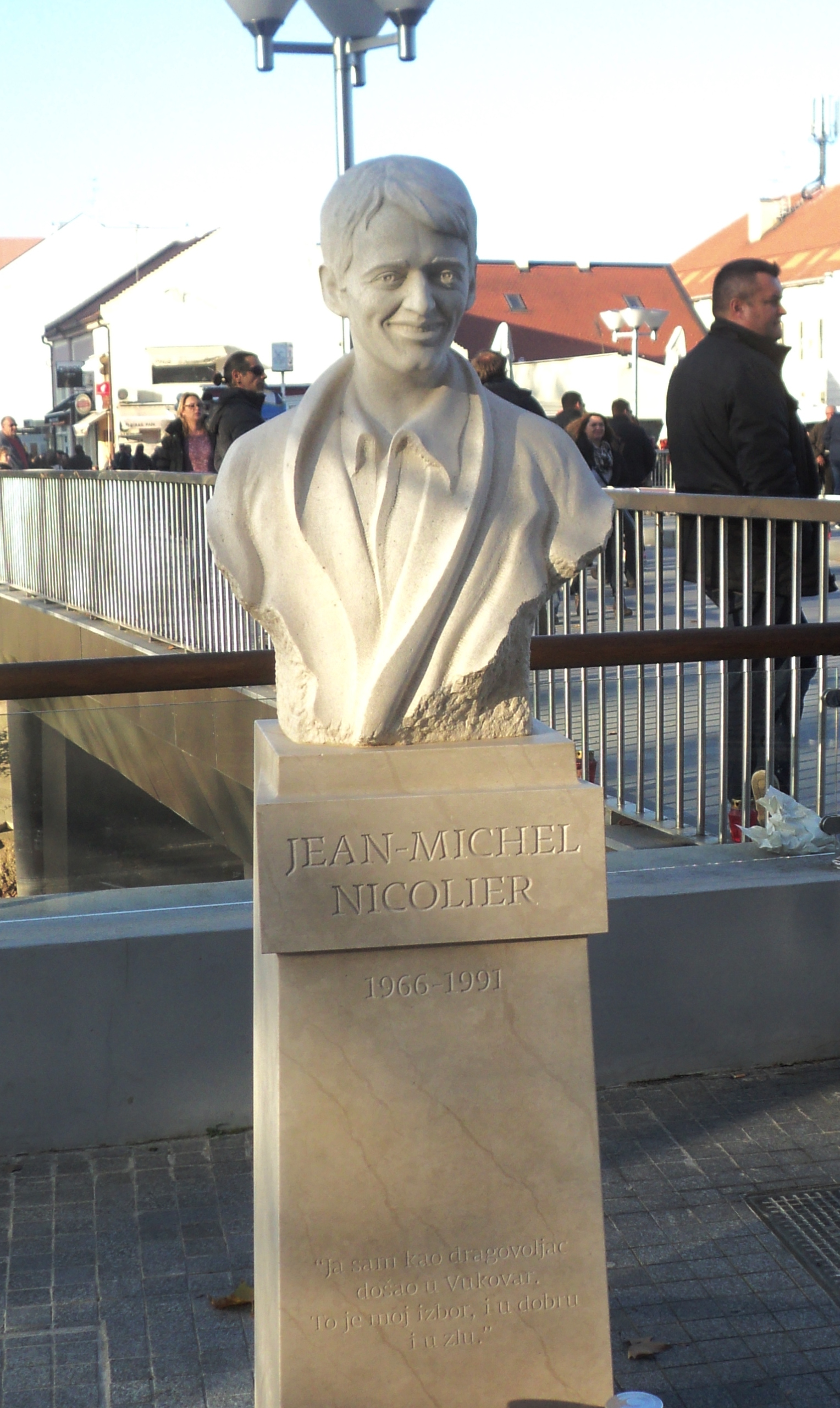
Jean-Michel's bust at the bridge named after him in Vukovar

In 2006 Nicollier was posthumously awarded the Memorial Plaque Vukovar 1991. In 2010, Croatian authors Višnja Starešina and Ivan Maloča released a documentary about the Vukovar massacre, telling the story of Siniša Glavašević as well as Nicollier. The programme was aired in prime-time by HRT on the 19th anniversary of the massacre.

Prompted by the publicity Nicollier's case received in 2010, a Croatian veteran Antun Ivanković from Tovarnik joined with Nevenka Nekić, a retired professor, to investigate the story, and contacted Nicollier's mother. In October 2011, Ivanković found that Nicollier was never entered into the official list of Croatian defenders, and advocated for the problem to be rectified; the Ministry of Veterans' Affairs entered Nicollier into the Registry not long afterwards.

On 17 November 2011, at the initiative of an NGO led by Ivanković, Nicollier was posthumously awarded with the Vukovar-Srijem County "Tribute for love, loyalty and bravery in the Croatian War of Independence". That same day, Nicollier was awarded with the Order of Nikola Šubić Zrinski for heroism. Nicollier's mother came to Zagreb with his younger brother Paul, to receive the order from Croatia's President Ivo Josipović.

In June 2012, the NGO published Nekić's book Jean ili miris smrti (Jean or the smell of death) about Nicollier. In August 2012, again at the initiative of Ivanković's NGO, Nicollier's mother met the Croatian Minister of Veterans' Affairs Predrag Matić, who confirmed she was entitled to the veteran's pension of her late son.

In May 2013 citizens of Vukovar decided by internet voting to name the new build 50-meter-long (160 ft) bridge on the river Vuka in his honour Most Jean-Michela Nicoliera.

34 years after his presumed death, Jean-Michel Nicolier's body was identified on October 29th, 2025., amongst other corpses on the Ovčara mass grave. He and 3 other corpses were found about a hundred meters from the hangar, next to the road that led to Ovčara.
