= List of Serbian paramilitary formations =

This is a list of Serbian paramilitary units and formations throughout history. It includes Serbian volunteer militias loyal to the Habsburg Monarchy prior to Serbian independence, and organizations loyal to Serbia since. Note that many of the organizations either started out or ended up folded into official military organizations. These are distinct from institutions with formal status and a direct leadership structure under a nation-state, examples being the World War I era First Serbian Division and the post-2006 modern Serbian Army, which do not belong on this list.

== Organizations created before World War I ==
- Serbian Militia, Habsburg militia, active in the Great Turkish War (1683–1699)
- Serbian Militia, Habsburg militia, active in the Kingdom of Serbia (1718–39)
- Serbian Free Corps, Habsburg militia, active in the Austro-Turkish War (1787–1791)
- Serbian Chetnik Organization, anti-Ottoman rebels, active in Old Serbia and Macedonia (1903–08)

== Balkan Wars and World War I ==
- Serbian Chetnik Organization, put under the command of the Royal Serbian Army in the Balkan Wars and World War I.
  - Association against Bulgarian Bandits, paramilitary organization in Macedonia in the interwar period
- Black Hand, secret society responsible for the assassination of Austrian Crownprince, the Archduke Franz Ferdinand.
  - Narodna Odbrana, militant group closely tied to the Black Hand.
- White Hand, a secret military organization in the Kingdom of Serbs, Croats, and Slovenes (later the Kingdom of Yugoslavia). It was established in order to counter the influence of the Black Hand, and relied on the People's Radical Party.

== World War II ==
- Chetnik Detachments of the Yugoslav Army (Chetniks)
  - Lim-Sandžak Chetnik Detachment
  - Dinara Division
- Pećanac Chetniks
- Serbian Volunteer Corps

== Yugoslav Wars ==
- Kninjas (Knindže), Serbian volunteer organization commanded by Dragan Vasiljković, active in Croatia.
- Serb Volunteer Guard (Srpska dobrovoljačka garda), also known as "Arkan's Tigers", Serbian volunteer organization, active in Croatia and Bosnia.
- Serbian Guard (Srpska garda), Serbian volunteer organization, armed wing of the Serbian Renewal Movement, active in Croatia in 1991.
- Dušan the Mighty Forces (Dušan Silni) Active in Croatia in 1991, military wing and unit of Serbian National Renewal
- White Eagles (Beli orlovi), also known as "Šešeljevci", Serbian volunteer organization, armed wing of the Serbian Radical Party, active in Bosnia and Croatia.
- Wolves of Vučjak (Vukovi s Vučjaka), Bosnian Serb organization, active in Bosnia and Croatia between 1991 and 1993.
- Yellow Wasps (Žute ose), Bosnian Serb organization, active in Bosnian Podrinje between April and October 1992.
- Scorpions (Škorpioni), Serb organization, active in Croatia, Bosnia and Kosovo.
- Leva Supoderica, active in Croatia during the Battle of Vukovar.
- Šiltovi, active in Glina and responsible of the Gornje Jame massacre
- Tobutski sokolovi, active in Bosnia.
- Serb Falcons (Srpski sokolovi), led by Siniša Vučinić
- Greek Volunteer Guard, Greek volunteer organization under the Army of Republika Srpska, active in Bosnia and Croatia.
- Jackals (Šakali), active in Kosovo in 1999.
- Serbian Chetnik Movement (Srpski četnički pokret), active in Bosnia and Croatia.

== Current ==
- Serbian Honour

== See also ==
- Chetniks, a disorganized set of militant groups associated with both World Wars and later conflicts
- Far-right politics in Serbia
- History of modern Serbia
- Serbian hajduks
- Serbian Volunteers (disambiguation)
- Yugoslav Partisans, anti-Nazi forces including Serbs among other ethnicities
