= Serbian Volunteers =

Terms such as Serbian Volunteers (Srp: Srpska dobrovoljačka), Serbian Volunteer Corps, Serbian Volunteer Division, Serbian Volunteer Force, Serbian Volunteer Guard, Serbian Volunteer Military, et cetera may refer to:

- Serbian Militia, a militia formed to fight the Ottoman Empire during the Great Turkish War
- Serbian Militia (1718–46), a militia formed to fight the Ottoman Empire during the Austro-Turkish War
- Serbian Free Corps, a militia formed to fight the Ottoman Empire in the 18th century, also known by the shortened name "Free Corps"
- First Serbian Volunteer Division, a World War I era military organization created in Odessa, also known by the names "First Serbian Division" and "Serbian First Division"
- Serbian Volunteer Corps (World War II), a formation of Nazi collaborators that began in 1941, also known by the acronym "SDK" and the name "Serbian Volunteer Command"
- Serb Volunteer Guard, a paramilitary unit active in the 1990s, also known by the acronym "SDG" and the names "Serbian Volunteer Guard" and "Arkan's Tigers"

== See also ==
- Chetniks, a disorganized set of militant groups associated with both World Wars and later conflicts
- List of Serbian paramilitary formations
- Yugoslav Partisans, anti-Nazi forces including Serbs among other ethnicities
