= Siniša Glavašević =

Croatian journalist (1960–1991)

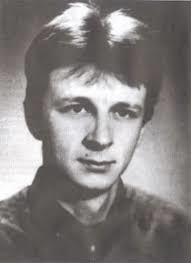
- Born: November 4, 1960; Vukovar, PR Croatia, FPR Yugoslavia
- Died: November 20, 1991 (aged 31); Ovčara, Croatia
- Occupation: Reporter

Siniša Glavašević (4 November 1960 – 20 November 1991) was a Croatian reporter who was killed by Serbian paramilitaries following the Battle of Vukovar.

== Early life ==
A native of Vukovar, Glavašević finished primary school there and entered the University of Sarajevo, where he graduated with a degree in Comparative Literature. During the Croatian War of Independence, he was chief editor of Radio Vukovar.

== War ==
During the Battle of Vukovar, Glavašević was regularly reporting from the besieged city. He is particularly remembered for a series of stories he had read to the listeners, that talked about basic human values. On 16 October 1991, Glavašević said on Croatian Radio:

Vukovar submits to Croatia, Europe and the world - either the Croatian authorities will do everything to obtain a permanent cease-fire, or they will send the necessary and efficient assistance, of the military kind, or they will evacuate the entire civilian population of this area. There is another option, and that is the complete and final destruction of the city and a massacre of the population, as well as two hundred and fifty heavily wounded. However, that option isn't on anyone's mind here. The heroes of this city are necessary for some time yet, as living witnesses of this war. Thank you Zagreb. Don't cut this part.

On 18 November 1991, Glavašević sent in his last report, which ended with:

The picture of Vukovar at the 22nd hour of the 87th day [of the siege] will remain forever in the memory of the witnesses of this time. There are infinite spooky sights, and you can smell the burning. We walk over bodies, building material, glass, detritus and the gruesome silence. ... We hope that the torments of Vukovar are over.

== Death ==
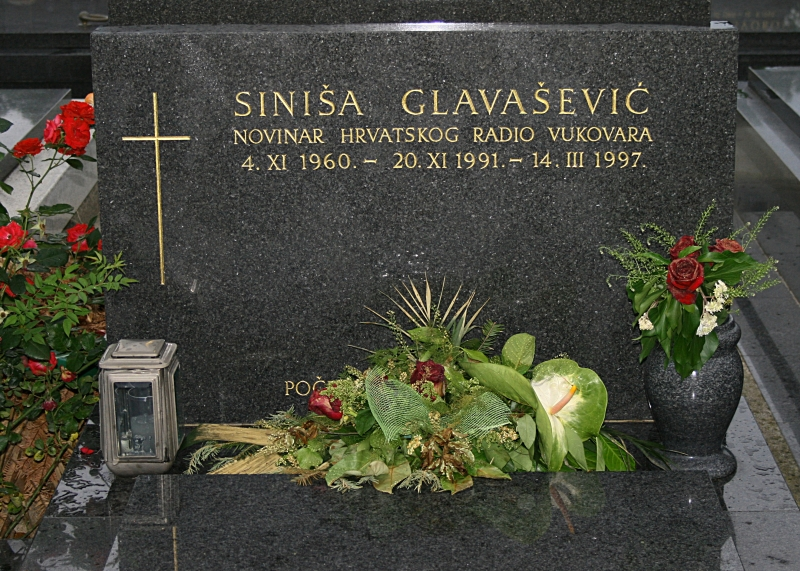
Siniša Glavašević's gravestone located in Mirogoj Cemetery

Glavašević disappeared shortly after this last report. He had been beaten and executed by Serbian paramilitary forces, along with hundreds of others between 18 and 20 November. In 1997, his body was exhumed from a mass grave in a nearby farm in Ovčara. He was 31 years old. Both Glavašević and fellow journalist Branimir Polovina, a native of Ovčara, were featured cases in Amnesty International's 1993-94 Campaign Against Disappearances and Political Killings. Polovina's funeral was held in Zagreb on 11 March 1997.

== Legacy ==
In 1992, Matica hrvatska printed Stories from Vukovar (Croatian: Priče iz Vukovara), a collection of stories by Glavašević. English translation of the collection was published in 2011.

== See also ==
- List of journalists killed in Europe
