= Yugoslav Division =

Royal Yugoslav Army Volunteer unit

- Active: January 1918–December 1918
- Country: Kingdom of Serbia
- Branch: Royal Serbian Army
- Type: Foreign volunteer
- Role: Infantry
- Size: Division
- Part of: Second Army Group
- Engagements: World War I: Vardar Offensive; Battle of Dobro Pole; Battle of Doiran

The Yugoslav Division (Serbian: Југословенска дивизија / Jugoslovenska divizija) was a Royal Serbian Army unit, established in January 1918. It was mostly composed of South Slavs volunteers from the Serbs, Croats, and Slovenes Volunteer Corps, former Austro-Hungarian prisoners in Russia and Serb volunteers from the United States and Europe. The division was raised in Salonika and took part in the breakthrough of the Macedonian front and the subsequent operations for the liberation of Serbia during World War I.

== Formation ==
In late 1917, a large number of volunteers from South Slavic nations travelled to the Macedonian front to volunteer fighting on the side of the Allies. The company of volunteers grew into a battalion, and then into a brigade, eventually becoming a division with the arrival of the two divisions of the Serbs, Croats, and Slovenes Volunteer Corps, a unit composed of former Austro-Hungarian prisoners in Russia previously known as the First Serbian Volunteer Division.

At the beginning of 1918 with the arrival of 12,500 volunteers of the corps in Salonica and following an influx of South Slav Volunteers, including 4,000 volunteers from America and more from Russia, the Yugoslav Committee decided that a Yugoslav volunteer formation needed to be created. Ante Trumbić, the president of the committee suggested in January to Regent Alexander that it should be called the "Yugoslav division of Serb, Croat and Slovene volunteers" but Alexander chose instead the Yugoslav division. The new unit was formed giving further support to the idea of creating a new South Slav.

In February 1918, the Vardar division was disbanded and became part of the Yugoslav Division, which was part of the Second Army. Most of the volunteers from Russia, retaining their formation structure from company to brigade, became part of the Yugoslav Division.

The Yugoslav division had two brigades, the Yugoslav and the Vardar, of two regiments each. The division numbered around 10,000 officers and men and became part of the 2nd Army. On the occasion of the entry of a large number of Yugoslavs, most of whom were Serbs from the territory of Austria-Hungary and Montenegro, into the ranks of the Serbian army, the Chief of Staff of the Supreme Command, General Petar Bojović, sent an order to the troops and volunteers on 12 December 1917.

All soldiers, no matter where they come from, should live among themselves as true brothers and most sincere comrades; they should have full confidence in their officers and be convinced that they will always lead them in the greatest conscientiousness and care in these difficult and serious times.

— General Petar Bojović, 12 December 1917,

== Vardar Offensive ==
In September 1918, the Yugoslav Volunteer Division participated in the breakthrough of the Macedonian Front alongside the Sumadija Division, the Timok Division and two French divisions. The front was more than 100 kilometers long, and the gap where the front was breached was between seven and nine kilometers.

It was decided that the offensive would begin in the sector Dobro Polje - Veternik - Kozjak, where the Serbian army was located, which consisted of a total of six divisions with 140,000 soldiers, among whom were about 25,000 volunteers. The Serbian army was divided into two armies - the first, commanded by Petar Bojović and the second of which the Yugoslav Division was part, led by Stepa Stepanović, while the commander of the staff was Živojin Mišić alongside Regent Aleksandar.

On September 15, at 5:30 a.m., the attack began with the 2nd Serbian Army followed by the Sumadija and the 122nd and 17th French colonial divisions followed by the Timok and the Yugoslav division. As part of the French and Serbian infantry, and part of the main thrust of the Entente offensive, the division fought and defeated the Bulgarian forces ar Dobro Pole After the breakthrough the Yugoslav Division with the 2nd Serbian Army continued to advance to prevent Bulgarian-German forces from establishing a new line of defense. Bulgarian-German troops tried to offer successive resistance but were forced to withdraw leaving large quantities of equipment behind them. With the defeat of Bulgaria, German-Austro-Hungarian forces in the Balkans found themselves in full retreat, followed by the collapse of the empire. Belgrade was liberated on 1 November 1918.

== Sources ==
- Gilbert, M. (2014). The First World War: A Complete History. RosettaBooks. ISBN 978-0-7953-3723-9.
- Mitrović, A. (2007). Serbia's Great War, 1914-1918. Central European studies. Purdue University Press. ISBN 978-1-55753-476-7.
- Hall, R.C. (2010). Balkan Breakthrough: The Battle of Dobro Pole 1918. Twentieth-Century Battles. Indiana University Press. ISBN 978-0-253-00411-6.
- Fourteen Centuries of Struggle for Freedom. Military Museum. 1968.
- "the breakthrough of our memory of the Thessaloniki front". РТС (in Serbian). 28 August 2020.
- "Volunteers arrive on the Thessaloniki front". NOVOSTI (in Slovenian). 18 March 2021.
- "Breakthrough of the Thessaloniki front in 1918". Weekly (in Serbian).
