= Leva Supoderica =

Paramilitary unit

- Лева Суподерица
- Active: August 1991 - December 1991
- Country: Serbia
- Allegiance: Serbian Radical Party
- Branch: Yugoslav People’s Army
- Type: Paramilitary
- Role: Reconnaissance; Urban Warfare; Close-quarters combat Counterinsurgency
- Engagements: Yugoslav Wars; Croatian War of Independence; Battle of Vukovar; Vukovar massacre

Commanders
- Notable commanders: Milan Lančužanin ‘Kameni’

Leva Supoderica (Serbian Cyrillic: Лева Суподерица) was a Serbian paramilitary unit and Party militia formed in 1991, originally under the wing of the Serbian Radical Party. the unit was incorporated into the 1st Guards Mechanised Brigade of the Yugoslav People's Army. Leva Supoderica was active in Croatia, commanded by the war criminal Milan "Kameni" Lančužanin during the Battle of Vukovar in the aftermath of the battle, Leva Supoderica were one of many perpetrators in the Vukovar massacre, the unit also guarded the Ovčara camp.

== War crimes ==
In 2017, a couple of members of the Leva Supoderica unit were convicted for the deaths of more than 200 Croatian civilians at the Ovčara camp.

The Leva Supoderica unit along with the Vukovar Territorial Defense (TO) tortured around 20 Croatian prisoners that had been sent to the Ovčara camp. Once the Yugoslav People’s Army withdrew to relieve the besieged barracks and other reasons, the Leva Supoderica unit and the Vukovar TO detained the Croatian prisoners and led them to a mass grave, where 10-20 were killed between 20 and 21 November 1991.

== See also ==
- White Eagles
- Vojislav Šešelj
