= First Serbian Volunteer Division =

Serbian Volunteer unit in WWI

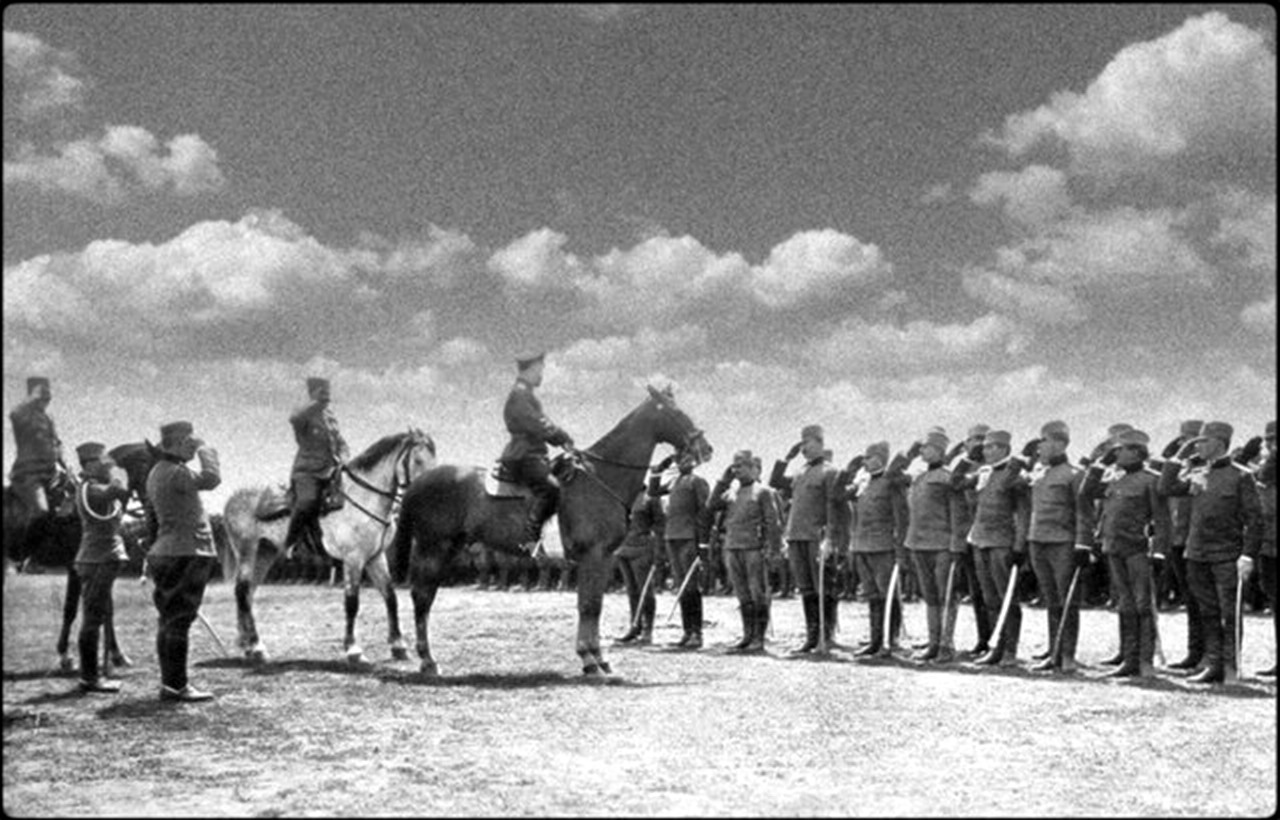
- Nicholas II reviewing the First Serbian Volunteer Division in Odessa (May 1916)
- Founded: June 1916
- Disbanded: 1918
- Allegiance: Serbia
- Branch: Royal Serbian Army
- Type: Ground Forces
- Size: 18,000; 42,000 (early 1917)
- Part of: 47th Russian Army Corps; First Serbian Army
- Garrison/HQ: Odessa, Russian Empire (1916–17); Salonika, Greece (1918)
- Engagements: World War I; Eastern Front (World War I); Battle of Bazargic; Vardar Offensive

Commanders
- Chief of Staff: Colonel Vojin Čolak-Antić
- Notable commanders: Colonel Stevan Hadžić
- Merged into: Yugoslav Division

The First Serbian Volunteer Division (Serbian: Srpski dobrovoljački korpus) or First Serbian Division, was a military formation of the First World War, created by Serbian Prime Minister Nikola Pašić, and organised in the city of Odessa in early 1916. This independent volunteer unit was primarily made up of South Slav Habsburg prisoners of war, detained in Russia, who had requested to fight alongside the Serbian Army. In April 1917 the name of the division was changed to the Serbs, Croats, and Slovenes Volunteer Corps.

== Composition ==
At the request of Serbian prisoners of war, out of the ranks of captured Austro-Hungarians soldiers, the Serbian consul in Russia Marko Cemović took advantage of the presence of Tsar Nicholas II in Odessa during a military parade, to personally present to the Emperor the project of a corps of Serbian volunteers. On 7 November 1915, the Tsar agreed to establish volunteer units in Russia. In 1916, a mission of the Serbian army went to Russia and started organising the Serbian prisoners of war captured by the Russians in their early offensives against the Austro-Hungarian army, those early volunteers also included Croats from Dalmatia, Bosnian and Slovenes who chose to join "in the spirit of Yugoslav unity".

Even though the Serbian volunteers greatly outnumbered all the other ethnic group, a large number of the division's officer corps was made of former Habsburg reserve officers of Croat and Slovene descent. In April 1917 the name of the division was changed to the Serbs, Croats, and Slovenes Volunteer Corps. The force holds a particularly significant place in World War I history due both to its intermingling of different Slavic ethnic groups as well as its role in the final military operations of the Salonika front.

It also included men from South Slav diaspora communities, especially the United States.

Fighting on behalf of the Russian government's cause of pan-Slavic unity, the division started out approximately 10,000 strong.

Nicholas II, while eager to use the Serbian diaspora for his own purposes, felt reluctant at first to set up the Volunteer Division given that recruiting prisoners of war to fight against their former country was considered a war crime under the Hague Conventions; according to historian Alfred Rieber soon the exigencies of war overcame his scruples. The Volunteer Division also featured a number of Czech and Slovak officers who later transferred to the Czechoslovak armed forces gathering in Russia known as the Czechoslovak Legion.

Volunteers continued to enlist over time, and by mid-August 1916, the division reached nearly 18,000 men. The General Staff was represented by cavalry Colonel Vojin Čolak-Antić flown in from Salonika for that purpose.

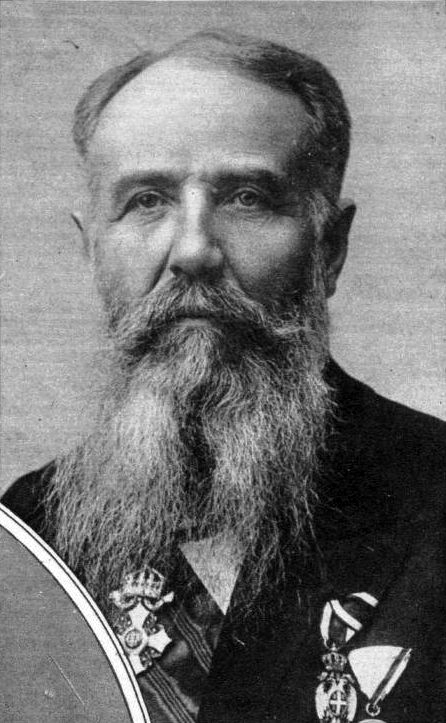
Prime Minister Nikola Pašić, founder of the Division.

The division was one of the contentious topics in the relations between the Yugoslav Committee and Serbia. The Committee wanted the force consisting of prisoners of war who had been captured from Austria-Hungary by Russia and now wanted to fight against the Austro-Hungarians on the side of Slavic independence to be called Yugoslav. However, Pašić successfully arranged through Serbian diplomatic mission in Russia to have the unit named the "First Serbian Volunteer Division", which was commanded by officers of the Royal Serbian Army who were sent to Russia for the task. While the committee hoped the force would help promote a common Yugoslav identity, Yugoslavism was actively suppressed by the officers, on instructions given by Pašić. As a result, 12,735 of 33,000 volunteers left the force in protest at its specifically Serbian identification, and recruitment of volunteers significantly slowed.

After the start of the February Revolution in 1917 as many as 12 735 soldiers left the Corps with some ending on opposing sides of the Russian Revolution.

In April 1917 the Pašić cabinet, under pressure from former POW officers, and by the revolutionary changes happening in Russia at the time, created a second division, the two divisions became part of a new force called the "Serbs, Croats, and Slovenes Volunteer Corps" it was 42,000 men strong and included the presence of soldiers' councils. The decision to not name the corps "Yugoslav" as the POW officers had requested but "Serbs, Croats, and Slovenes" as well as what they perceived as the Serb officers treating the unit as a part of the Serbian army, led to the massive resignations of Croat and Slovene officers who chose to join Russian units instead.

On 29 July 1917, General Mihajlo Zivković became Corps Commander.

== Battles ==
As part of the Russian 47th Corps under the command of General Zayonchkovsky, the First Serb Division, 23,500 men strong, was sent to the Dobruja front in Romania to assist the Romanian army fighting Bulgarian forces reinforced by Turkish and German units. The Division showed high combat morale but was restrained by inadequate equipment and the campaign ended terribly with 1,939 dead and 8,000 wounded.

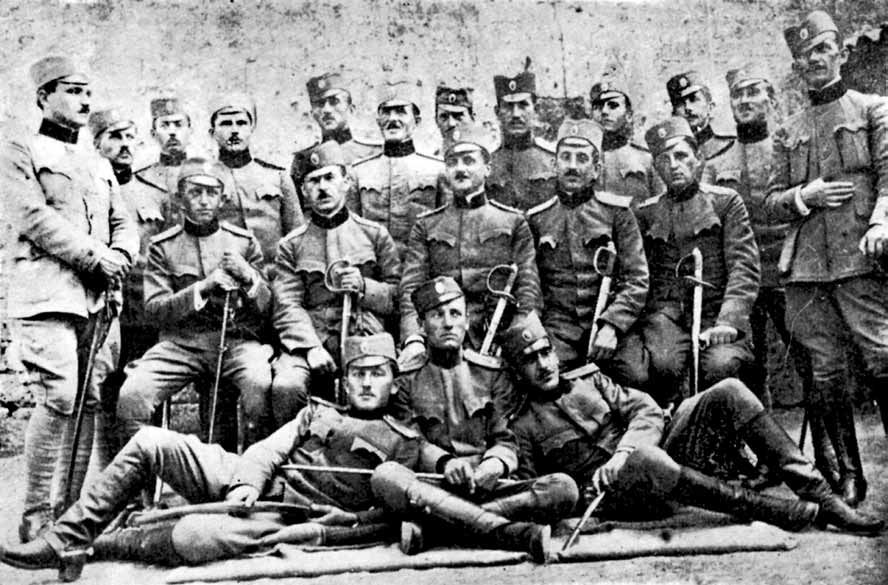
Slovenian soldiers of the Serbs, Croats, and Slovenes Volunteer Corps. Odessa c.1917

In 1917, it was decided to send the Corps to the Macedonian front. The first division, 10,000 strong was able to leave Russia travelling west reaching Salonika at the end of the year. In the meantime, the Bolsheviks had seized power in Russia and decided to put every possible obstacle in the journey of the remaining 6,000 men, denying them the route to the West, forcing them to go via the Trans-Siberian to China to Japanese held Port Arthur. From there, they were sent on a ship to Hong Kong then to Egypt, and on to Salonika. The first company arrived on 29 March 1918 at the Serbian camp at Mikra after travelling 14,000 miles in eleven weeks. The two divisions were restored and rearmed by the Allied Army of the Orient under French command, a new Yugoslav unit was created on 14 January 1918 within the Serbian army, the 1st Yugoslav Division.

== Legacy ==
According to Rieber, while definitely playing a role in crucial fighting on the Eastern Front, the exploits of both Serbian divisions became magnified for propaganda purposes by nationalists. In retrospect, tensions both on and off the battlefield that existed not just in terms of ethnic heritage but also related to economic class and political ideology, even while fighters faced a common enemy in the Central Powers, foreshadowed conflicts in the future nation of Yugoslavia. According to Stevan Hadžić the battle of Dobruja was: "where all three brothers, Serb, Croat and Slovene, fought for the first time shoulder to shoulder for liberation and unification".

== Monument ==
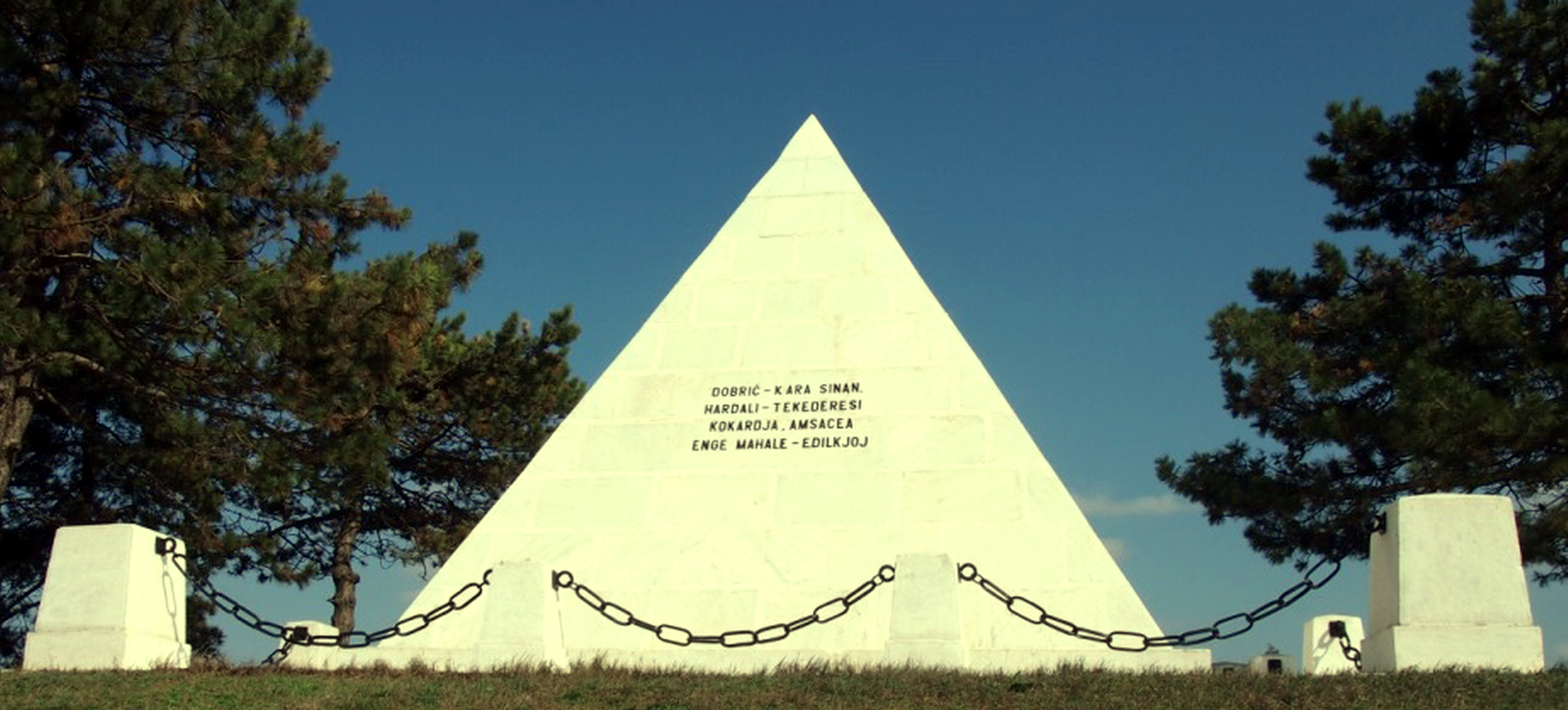
Monument of the First Serbian Volunteer Division in Medgidia

A white pyramid memorial known as the Monument to the Heroes of the First Serbian Volunteer Division (Serbian Cyrillic: Споменик јунацима Прве српске добровољачке дивизије) is located as a part of a cemetery complex in Medgidia, a city in southeastern Romania near the Black Sea. The monument was dedicated in 1926 as a token of gratitude for the heroic struggle of all units of the First Serbian Volunteer Division. The area itself contains the remains of thousands who died in defense of Dobruja. In a 2013 ceremony, local mayor Marian Iordache remarked, "we can never forget their achievement... so it shall remain until the end of time."

== See also ==
- Balkan Theatre of World War I
- Modern history of Serbia
- Pan-Slavism
- Serbian Volunteers

== Bibliography ==
- Banac, Ivo (2015). The National Question in Yugoslavia: Origins, History, Politics. Cornell University Press. ISBN 978-1-5017-0193-1.
- Banac, Ivo (1984). The National Question in Yugoslavia: Origins, History, Politics. Ithaca: Cornell University Press. ISBN 0-8014-1675-2.
- Boban, Branka (2019). "Stavovi hrvatske političke elite prema stvaranju jugoslavenske države" [Attitudes of Croatian political elite towards formation of the Yugoslav state]. Tragovi: časopis za srpske i hrvatske teme (in Croatian). 2 (2). Zagreb: Serb National Council: 8–98. doi:10.52328/t. ISSN 2623-8926.
- Kurapovna, Marcia (2009). Shadows on the Mountain: The Allies, the Resistance, and the Rivalries. Wiley. ISBN 978-0-470-61563-8.
- Malcolm, Noel (October 1996). Bosnia: A Short History. NYU Press. ISBN 978-0-8147-5561-7.
- Newman, John Paul (25 June 2015). Yugoslavia in the Shadow of War: Veterans and the Limits of State Building, 1903–1945. Cambridge University Press. ISBN 978-1-107-07076-9.
- Alan Palmer (6 October 2011). The Gardeners of Salonika: The Macedonian Campaign 1915–1918. Faber & Faber. ISBN 978-0-571-28093-3.
- "A great mark of Serbian military glory". Politika Online (in Serbian).
- Plut-Pregelj, L.; Kranjc, G.; Lazarević, Ž.; Rogel, C. (2018). Historical Dictionary of Slovenia. Historical Dictionaries of Europe. Rowman & Littlefield Publishers. ISBN 978-1-5381-1106-2.
- Rieber, Alfred J. (2014). The Struggle for the Eurasian Borderlands: From the Rise of Early Modern Empires to the End of the First World War. Cambridge University Press. ISBN 978-1-139-86796-2.
- Stanić, Đorđe (2003). Faithful Serbs and the Fatherland: The Volunteers of the Great War of Serbia 1914–1918 (in Serbian). Military Publishing House. ISBN 978-86-335-0134-7.
- Thomas, N.; Babac, D.; Pavlovic, D. (2012). Armies in the Balkans 1914–18. Men-at-Arms. Bloomsbury Publishing. ISBN 978-1-78096-735-6.
- Vojnoistorijski institut (1954). Jugoslovenski dobrovoljački korpus u Rusiji: prilog istoriji dobrovoljačkog pokreta, 1914–1918 (in Serbian). Vojnoizdavački zavod "Vojno delo,".
