= Ovčara camp =

Serbian Prison Camp

Ovčara
- concentration camp
- Location within Croatia
- Coordinates: 45°17′44″N 19°03′33″E
- Location: Grabovo, just outside Vukovar, Croatia
- Operated by: Croatian Serb Territorial Defense, Leva Supoderica and the Yugoslav People's Army
- Operational: October–December 1991
- Inmates: Croatian prisoners of war and civilians, as well as some Serbs, Muslims, and Hungarians
- Number of inmates: 3,000–4,000
- Killed: 260 dead or missing

Ovčara was a Serbian transit camp for Croatian prisoners during the Croatian War of Independence, from October to December 1991, and the location of the Ovčara massacre.

== Prison camp ==
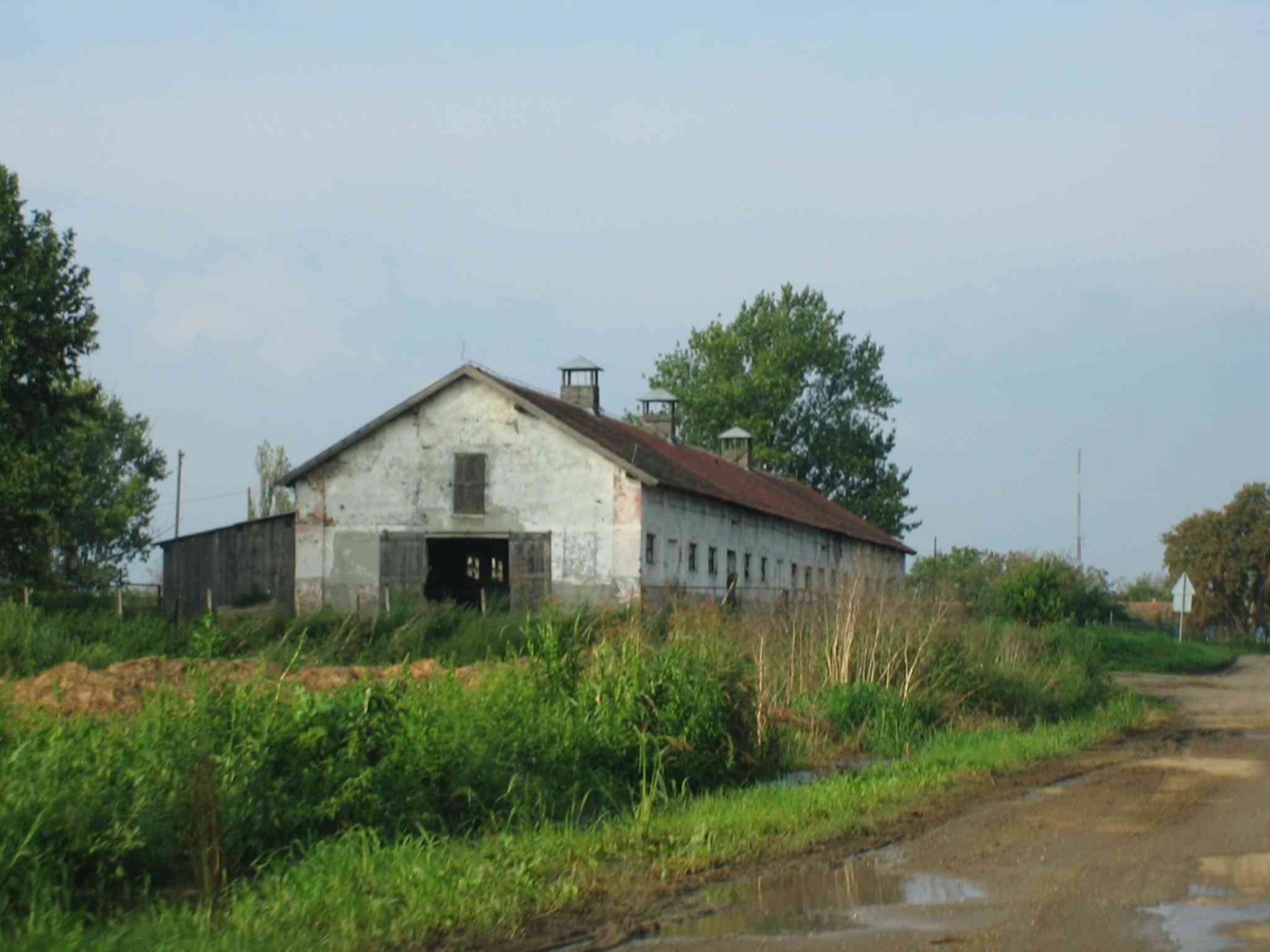
Ovčara farm in 2005

Ovčara is located 5 kilometers southeast of the city of Vukovar. It is a desolate stretch of land where the Vukovar agricultural conglomerate built cattle-raising facilities after World War II. These facilities are storage hangars, which are fenced and can be easily guarded. The hangars are made of brick and have a big sliding front door, which includes a small door.

The Serbian forces turned Ovčara into a prison camp in early October 1991. Aside from the massacre, 3,000 to 4,000 male prisoners were temporarily held in the camp before being transported to the prison in Sremska Mitrovica or to the local army barracks, which was the transit point for the Serbian detention camps of Stajićevo, Begejci and others. Some of the Serb forces were led by Željko Ražnatović — also known as "Arkan" — who directed much of the pillaging and murder that occurred in Vukovar during and after the siege.

At the end of the battle of Vukovar and in the prelude to the Vukovar hospital massacre, numerous men were brought to Ovčara, including wounded patients, hospital staff and some of their family members, former defenders of Vukovar, Croatian political activists, journalists and other civilians. One member of the group standing trial in Belgrade for the executions testified that "among the prisoners, there were quite a number of civilians and wounded persons with bandaged wounds and casts", including a pregnant woman. Several witnesses at the trial, former JNA soldiers, also confirmed there were civilians present at Ovčara.

The archive of the city government of Vukovar has some testimonies of Ovčara prisoners. When they came out of the buses, they had to run between two rows of Serbian soldiers and other forces, who beat them with rifle butts, clubs and other blunt weapons. The beatings continued in the hangars, where at least two men died from wounds inflicted on them by the beatings. Ovčara was closed on December 25, 1991. In total, at least 200 men were killed at Ovčara, and there were also 64 missing prisoners.

== Massacre ==
On November 18, 1991, which was the day when the battle of Vukovar ended, the Serbian forces captured the Vukovar hospital. They gathered the wounded fighters, civilians and hospital staff, put them in buses and transported them to Ovčara. The prisoners were brought together, massacred, executed by firearms, thrown in a trench and covered by earth.

The Ovčara mass grave lies northeast from the facilities, one kilometer from the Ovčara-Grabovo road. It belongs to the category of the mass graves with the remains of prisoners of war and civilians executed in the immediate vicinity or at the very place of the grave.
