= Grabovo, Croatia =

Settlement in Tompojevci Municipality, Croatia

Grabovo
- Coordinates: 45°16′34″N 19°3′36″E

Area
  - Total: 6.0 km^{2} (2.3 sq mi)

Population (2021)
  - Total: 0
  - Density: 0.0/km^{2} (0.0/sq mi)

Grabovo is a settlement south of Vukovar, Croatia. The location was established as a pustara, a Pannonian type of hamlet. It consists of two hamlets, Ovčara and Jakobovac, in the north, which are administratively part of the city of Vukovar, and have a total population of 47, and an uninhabited section in the south which is administratively under the municipality of Tompojevci.

Before the Croatian War of Independence, Grabovo had 192 inhabitants. In 1991, 154 inhabitants were expelled from Grabovo, and to this day no one has returned to Grabovo.

Ovčara is best known for the Ovčara camp and the Ovčara massacre of 1991.

Ovčara and Jakobovac each used to be registered as a standalone settlement, but were joined under the name Grabovo in 1991, and subsequently administratively split in 2001.
