= List of association football families of former Yugoslavia =

This is a list of association football families of former Yugoslavia and its successor national association football teams.

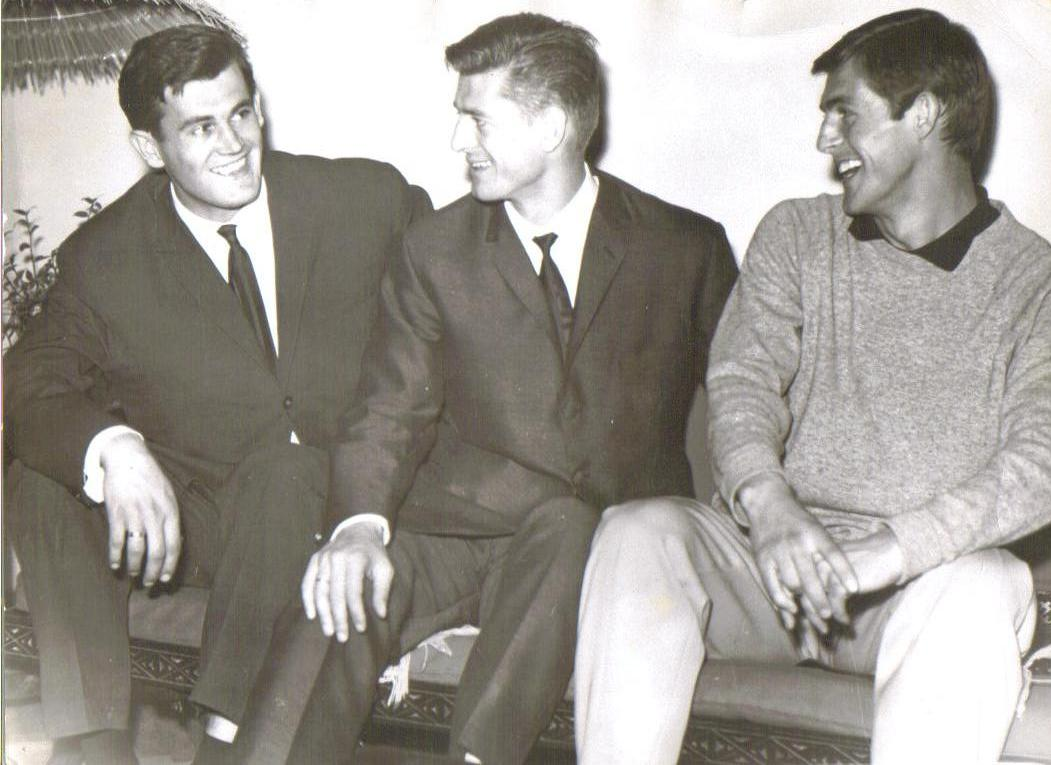
The Milutinović brothers: Milorad (left), Miloš (middle) and Bora (right)

Families included on the list must have

1. at least, one member of the family is capped by a national team on the senior level or an important person in the game of football (e.g., notable coaches, referees, club chairmen, etc.)
2. a second member must be a professional player or capped by a national team on the U-17 level or above.

== Bosnia and Herzegovina ==
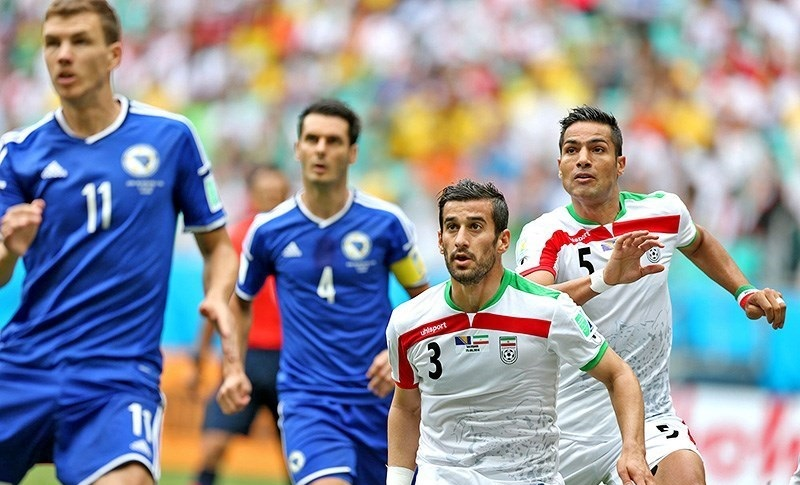
Cousins Edin Džeko and Emir Spahić both played for Bosnia and Herzegovina

- Nail Beširović, Dino Beširević (son)
- Milorad Bilbija, Nemanja Bilbija (son)
- Dragan Glogovac, Stevo Glogovac (brother)
- Anel Hadžić, Elvir Hadžić (brother), (Slovenia) Damir Hadžić (cousin)
- Izet Hajrović, (Note: Born in Switzerland, was capped for their under-20 and under-21 and played 1 international senior match for Switzerland, before switching allegiance to Bosnia and Herzegovina.) Sead Hajrović (Note: Born in Switzerland and was capped for their under-15, under-17, under-18 and under-19 sides.) (brother)
- Sejad Halilović, (Note: Played 1 international senior match for Croatia before switching allegiance to Bosnia and Hezegovina) (Croatia) Alen Halilović (son), (Croatia) Dino Halilović (son)
- Vedad Ibišević, Elvir Ibišević (cousin)
- Dušan Kerkez, (Cyprus) Strahinja Kerkez (son)
- Meho Kodro, (Note: Played 2 international matches for Yugoslavia before switching allegiance to Bosnia and Hezegovina) Kenan Kodro (Note: Born in Spain but has represented Bosnia and Hezegovina internationally) (son)
- Boban Lazić, (Netherlands) Vlatko Lazić (cousin)
- Jasmin Mujdža, Mensur Mujdža (brother)
- Husref Musemić, Vahidin Musemić (brother)
- Zlatan Nalić, Adi Nalić (son)
- Emir Spahić, Edin Džeko (cousin)
- Safet Sušić, Sead Sušić (brother)
- Armin Tanković, (Sweden) Muamer Tanković (cousin)
- Damir Vrančić, Mario Vrančić (Note: Born in Yugoslavia (Croatia) but has represented German youth sides.) (brother)
- Ognjen Vranješ, Stojan Vranješ (brother)
- Zlatko Vujović, Zoran Vujović (brother)

== Croatia ==
- Mate Baturina, Roko Baturina (son), Martin Baturina (son)
- Josip Bulat, Ivan Bulat (brother), Marko Bulat (son)
- Davor Čop, Duje Čop (son)
- Branko Culina, (Australia) Jason Culina (son)
- Tonči Gabrić, Drago Gabrić (son), Paškvalina Gabrić (daughter)
- Nikola Gavrić, (Bosnia and Herzegovina) Andrea Gavrić (sister)
- Alen Halilović (see (Bosnia and Herzegovina) Sejad Halilović)
- Zdenko Jedvaj, Tin Jedvaj (son)
- Niko Kovač, Robert Kovač (brother)
- (Socialist Federal Republic of Yugoslavia) (Croatia) Zlatko Kranjčar, Niko Kranjčar (son)
- Ivica Landeka, (Bosnia and Herzegovina) Davor Landeka (brother), Iva Landeka (sister), Josip Landeka (cousin)
- Dejan Lovren, Davor Lovren (brother)
- Stojan Mamić, Zdravko Mamić, Zoran Mamić (brothers)
- Mato Mandžukić, Mario Mandžukić (son)
- Ana Maria Marković, Kristina Marković (sister)
- Tomislav Marić, Marijo Marić (brother)
- Luka Modrić (see (Australia) Mark Viduka)
- Igor Pajač, Marko Pajač (brother)
- Igor Pamić, Alen Pamić, Zvonko Pamić (sons)
- Dado Pršo, (France) Lorenzo Pršo (son), (Serbia) Milan Pršo (cousin), (Australia) Luka Prso (nephew)
- Milan Rapaić, Boris Rapaić (son)
- Krševan Santini, Ivan Santini (brother)
- Milan Šašić, Marko Šašić (son), (Germany) Célia Šašić (daughter-in-law)
- Kujtim Shala, (Kosovo) Andis Shala (son)
- Ahmad Sharbini, Anas Sharbini (brother)
- Dario Šimić, Josip Šimić (brother), Roko Šimić (son)
- Josip Skoblar, Dominik Livaković (second-grandnephew)
- Ivan Smolčić, Hrvoje Smolčić (twin brother)
- Zvonimir Soldo, Matija Soldo, Filip Soldo, Nikola Soldo (sons)
- Luka Sučić, Petar Sučić (cousin)
- Filip Tapalović, (Germany) Toni Tapalović (brother)
- Vladimir Vasilj, (Bosnia and Herzegovina) Nikola Vasilj (son), (Bosnia and Herzegovina) Filip Vasilj (son)
- Rudika Vida, Domagoj Vida (son)
- Rado Vidošić, (Australia) Dario Vidošić (son)

== Kosovo ==
- Agim Ajdarević, (Albania) Astrit Ajdarević (son), (Sweden) Alfred Ajdarević (son)
- Enis Alushi, (Note: Was capped for Germany's under-19 and under-20 sides, before changing allegiance to Kosovo.) (Germany) Fatmire Alushi (née Bajramaj) (wife)
- Halil Asani, (Serbia) Elmir Asani (son)
- Besart Berisha, Enis Fetahu, Samir Ujkani (brother-in-law)
- Valon Berisha, (Note: Played for the Norway youth national teams and 18 games for the senior team before changing his allegiance to Kosovo.) (Norway) Veton Berisha (brother)
- Suad Sahiti, Emir Sahiti (Note: Was capped for Albania's under-19 and under-21 sides, before changing allegiance to Kosovo.) (brother)
- Arianit Shaqiri, (Switzerland) Xherdan Shaqiri (brother), Eldonit Shaqiri (cousin)
- Alketa Rama, (Switzerland) Milaim Rama (father)

== Montenegro ==
- Bojan Brnović, Nenad Brnović (brother)
- Branko Brnović, Dragoljub Brnović (brother)
- Igor Gluščević, Vladimir Gluščević (brother)
- Ivan Ivanović, Igor Ivanović (brother)
- Matija Sarkic, Oliver Sarkic (Note: Matija and Oliver Sarkic were born in England, but represented Montenegro.) (twins)

== North Macedonia ==
- Boban Babunski, (Note: Played two international matches for Yugoslavia before it split, and then played 23 international matches for Macedonia.) David Babunski (son), Dorian Babunski (son)
- Boško Gjurovski, (Note: Played 4 international matches for Yugoslavia before the split and then played 7 international matches for Macedonia.) Milko Gjurovski (brother), (Note: Played 6 international matches for Yugoslavia before the split and then played 3 international matches for Macedonia.) Mario Gjurovski (son of Milko)
- Agim Ibraimi, Arijan Ademi (Note: Born in Croatia, was capped for their youth sides and played 3 international senior matches for Croatia, before switching allegiance to Macedonia.) (cousin)
- Goran Pandev, Sashko Pandev (brother)
- Stefan Ristovski, Milan Ristovski (brothers)
- Goran Stankovski, Luka Stankovski (son)

== Serbia ==
=== A ===
- Ivan Adžić, Luka Adžić (son)
- Dušan Arsenijević, Filip Arsenijević (son), Nemanja Arsenijević (son/brother)
- Halil Asani, Elmir Asani (son)

=== B ===
- Dušan Belić, Luka Belić, Kristijan Belić (sons)
- Dragiša Binić, Vladan Binić (Note: Was born in Serbia, capped by the Czech Republic's under-17 side before switching allegiance to Serbia.) (son)
- Nenad Bjeković, Nenad Bjeković Jr. (son)
- Goran Bunjevčević, Mirko Bunjevčević (brother)

=== C ===
- Ivan Čančarević, Milan Čančarević (brother), Luka Čančarević (son of Ivan/nephew), (Armenia) Ognjen Čančarević (nephew/son of Milan/cousin)
- Srđan Čebinac, Zvezdan Čebinac (twin brother)
- Miroslav Čermelj, Luka Čermelj (son), Filip Čermelj (son/brother)
- Goran Ćurko, Saša Ćurko (son)

=== D ===
- Jovan Damjanović, Aleksa Damjanović (son)
- Milan Davidov, Aleksandar Davidov (cousin)
- Zoran Dimitrijević, Miloš Dimitrijević (Note: Was born in Serbia, capped by France's under-18 side before switching allegiance to Serbia.) (son)
- Boban Dmitrović, Filip Dmitrović (son)
- Goran Đorović, Zoran Đorović (twin brother)
- Ivan Dudić, Milan Dudić (twin brother)
- Nenad Džodić, Stefan Džodić (son)

=== F ===
- Darko Fejsa, Ljubomir Fejsa (brother)

=== G ===
- Vladimir Gaćinović, Mijat Gaćinović (son)
- Pavle Grubješić, Nikola Grubješić (son)
- Nebojša Gudelj, Nemanja Gudelj (son), Dragiša Gudelj (son/brother)

=== I ===
- Luka Ilić, Ivan Ilić (brother)
- Ilija Ivić, Vladimir Ivić (brother)
- Radovan Ivković, (United Arab Emirates) Saša Ivković

=== J ===
- Milan Jovanović, Lazar Jovanović (son)

=== K ===
- Marko Kerkez, (Hungary) Milos Kerkez (brother)
- Zlatko Kežman, Mateja Kežman (son)
- Dušan Kljajić, Filip Kljajić (son)
- Nikola Kolarov, Aleksandar Kolarov (brother)
- Bojan Krasić, Miloš Krasić (brother)
- Slobodan Krčmarević, Nikola Krčmarević (son)
- Blagomir Krivokuća, Petar Krivokuća (brother), Bratislav Živković (son-in-law of Blagomir/cousin)
- Bojan Krkić Sr., (Spain) Bojan Krkić (son)
- Slavoljub Krnjinac, Vladimir Krnjinac (son)

=== L ===
- Nikola Lazetić, Žarko Lazetić (brother)

=== M ===
- Nebojša Marinković, Nenad Marinković (brother)
- Filip Marković, Lazar Marković (brother)
- Nemanja Matić, Uroš Matić (brother)
- Radmilo Mihajlović, Stefan Mihajlović (son)
- Siniša Mihajlović, (Italy) Alessandro Vogliacco (son-in-law)
- Milan Milijaš, Nenad Milijaš (cousin)
- Duško Milinković, Marko Milinković (son)
- Nikola Milinković, Sergej Milinković-Savić (son), Vanja Milinković-Savić (son/brother)
- Goran Milojević, Vladan Milojević (brother), Stefan Milojević (son of Goran/nephew), (Greece) Nemanja Milojević (nephew/son of Vladan/cousin)
- Savo Milošević, Nikola Milošević (son)
- Đorđe Milovanović, Dejan Milovanović (son), Branislav Ivanović (nephew/cousin)
- Goran Milovanović, Neško Milovanović (brother), Uroš Milovanović (son of Goran/nephew), Vasilije Veljko Milovanović (nephew/son of Neško/cousin)
- Miloš Milutinović, Milorad Milutinović (brother), (Mexico) Bora Milutinović (brother)
- Mitar Mrkela, Andrej Mrkela (son)
- Slavoljub Muslin, (France) Marko Muslin (son)

=== O ===
- Dragan Okuka, Dražen Okuka (son)

=== P ===
- Blagoje Paunović, Veljko Paunović (son)
- Ilija Petković, Dušan Petković (son)

=== R ===
- Bogdan Račić, Uroš Račić (twin brother)
- Branko Rašović, Vuk Rašović (son)

=== S ===
- Dušan Savić, Vujadin Savić (son)
- Slađan Šćepović, Stefan Šćepović (son), Marko Šćepović (son/brother)
- Milovan Sikimić, Predrag Sikimić (brother)
- Branko Smiljanić, Milan Smiljanić (son)
- Dragoljub Srnić, Slavoljub Srnić (twin brother)
- Dejan Stanković, Filip Stanković, Aleksandar Stanković (sons), (Slovenia) Milenko Ačimovič (brother-in-law)
- Predrag Stevanović, (Germany) Aleksandar Stevanović (brother)
- Vladan Stojković, Vladimir Stojković (brother), (Portugal) Vladimir Stojković (son)
- Miljaim Sulejmani, Miralem Sulejmani (son)
- Ratko Svilar, Mile Svilar (son)

=== V ===
- Zvonko Varga, Saša Varga (son)
- Nebojša Vignjević, Nikola Vignjević (brother)
- Nebojša Vučićević, Vanja Vučićević (son)
- Vukadin Vukadinović, Miljan Vukadinović (brother)

=== Z ===
- Ilija Zavišić, Bojan Zavišić (son)
- Nikola Žigić, Branko Žigić (brother)

== Slovenia ==
- Aleš Čeh, Nastja Čeh (brother)
- Branko Elsner, Marko Elsner (son), Luka Elsner, Rok Elsner (grandsons, sons of Marko)
- Primož Gliha, Erik Gliha (son)
- Damir Hadžić, (Bosnia and Herzegovina) Anel Hadžić (cousin), (Bosnia and Herzegovina) Elvir Hadžić (cousin, brother of Anel)
- Jasmin Handanović, Samir Handanović (cousin)
- Amir Karić, Sven Karić (son)
- Robert Koren, Tian Nai Koren (son)
- Miha Mevlja, Nejc Mevlja (twin brother)
- Mladen Rudonja, Roy Rudonja (son)
- Janez Strajnar, Mark Strajnar (son), Aljaž Strajnar (son)
- Zlatko Zahovič, Luka Zahovič (son)

== Yugoslavia ==
- Dragutin Babić, Nikola Babić (brother)
- Zoran Batrović, (Montenegro) Veljko Batrović (son)
- Bruno Belin, Rudolf Belin (brother)
- Mirko Bonačić, Antun Bonačić (brother)
- Bojan Brnović, Nenad Brnović (brother)
- Dragoljub Brnović, Branko Brnović (brother)
- Zlatko Čajkovski, Željko Čajkovski (brother)
- Srđan Čebinac, Zvezdan Čebinac (twin brother)
- Zvjezdan Cvetković, Borislav Cvetković (brother)
- Ranko Đorđić, (Sweden) Bojan Djordjic (son)
- Nebojša Gudelj, (Serbia) Nemanja Gudelj, (Serbia) Dragiša Gudelj (sons)
- Ilija Ivić, (Serbia and Montenegro) Vladimir Ivić (brother)
- Fahrudin Jusufi, Sascha Jusufi (son)
- Bojan Krkić, Sr., (Spain) Bojan Krkić (son), (Argentina) Lionel Messi (fourth cousin of Bojan, Jr.)
- Zoran Marić, (Serbia) Goran Marić (son)
- Nikola Marjanović, Blagoje Marjanović (brother)
- Jozo Matošić, Frane Matošić (brother)
- Predrag Mijatović, (Montenegro) Đorđije Ćetković (nephew), (Montenegro) Marko Ćetković (nephew, brother of Đorđije)
- Duško Milinković, (Serbia) Marko Milinković (son)
- Miloš Milutinović, Milorad Milutinović (brother), Bora Milutinović (brother)
- Ivica Osim, (Bosnia and Herzegovina) Amar Osim (son)
- Hugo Pažur, Alfons Pažur (brother)
- Ilija Petković, (Serbia and Montenegro) Dušan Petković (son)
- Refik Šabanadžović, (Bosnia and Herzegovina) Anel Šabanadžović (son)
- Šime Poduje, Veljko Poduje (brother)
- Niša Saveljić, (Montenegro) Esteban Saveljich (cousin)
- Sead Sušić, (Bosnia and Herzegovina) Safet Sušić (Note: Played 54 international matches for Yugoslavia before it split, and then played 2 international matches for Bosnia and Herzegovina.) (brother), (Bosnia and Herzegovina) Tino-Sven Sušić (Note: Has been capped for Belgium's under-18 and under-19 sides.) (son of Sead)
- Ratko Svilar, (Serbia) Mile Svilar (son)
- Zlatko Vujović, Zoran Vujović (twin brother)
- Dušan Zinaja, Branko Zinaja (brother)

== See also ==
- List of professional sports families
- List of family relations in American football
  - List of second-generation National Football League players
- List of association football (soccer) families
  - List of African association football families
  - List of European association football families
    - List of English association football families
    - List of Scottish football families
    - List of Spanish association football families
  - Category:Association football families
- List of Australian rules football families
- List of second-generation Major League Baseball players
- List of second-generation National Basketball Association players
- List of boxing families
- List of chess families
- List of International cricket families
- List of family relations in the National Hockey League
- List of family relations in rugby league
- List of international rugby union families
- List of professional wrestling families
