= Žegar, Croatia =

- Interactive map of Žegar, Croatia
- Coordinates: 44.151°N 15.858°E

Žegar is a Croatian historical settlement in the mountainous Bukovica region, above the Zrmanja River, not far from the Krupa Monastery. The settlement of Žegar was created next to the cylindrical tower from the Venetian-Ottoman wars, after which it got its name. The village itself lied above the Žegar Field, from where the population had long "jumped into" (i.e. guerilla warfare) the Dinara, the Venetian-Ottoman border for centuries. Today, the historical region includes the villages of Kaštel Žegarski, Bogatnik, Komazeci, and Nadvoda, which are all administratively part of the Obrovac Municipality.

== Notable people ==
- Janko Mitrović (1613–1659), Morlach army leader
- Stojan Janković (1636–1687), Morlach army leader
- Gerasim Zelić (1752–1828), Serbian Orthodox archimandrite and writer
- Vladimir Milić (1955-), retired Serbian shot putter
