= Bijela (Karin Sea) =

River in southern Croatia

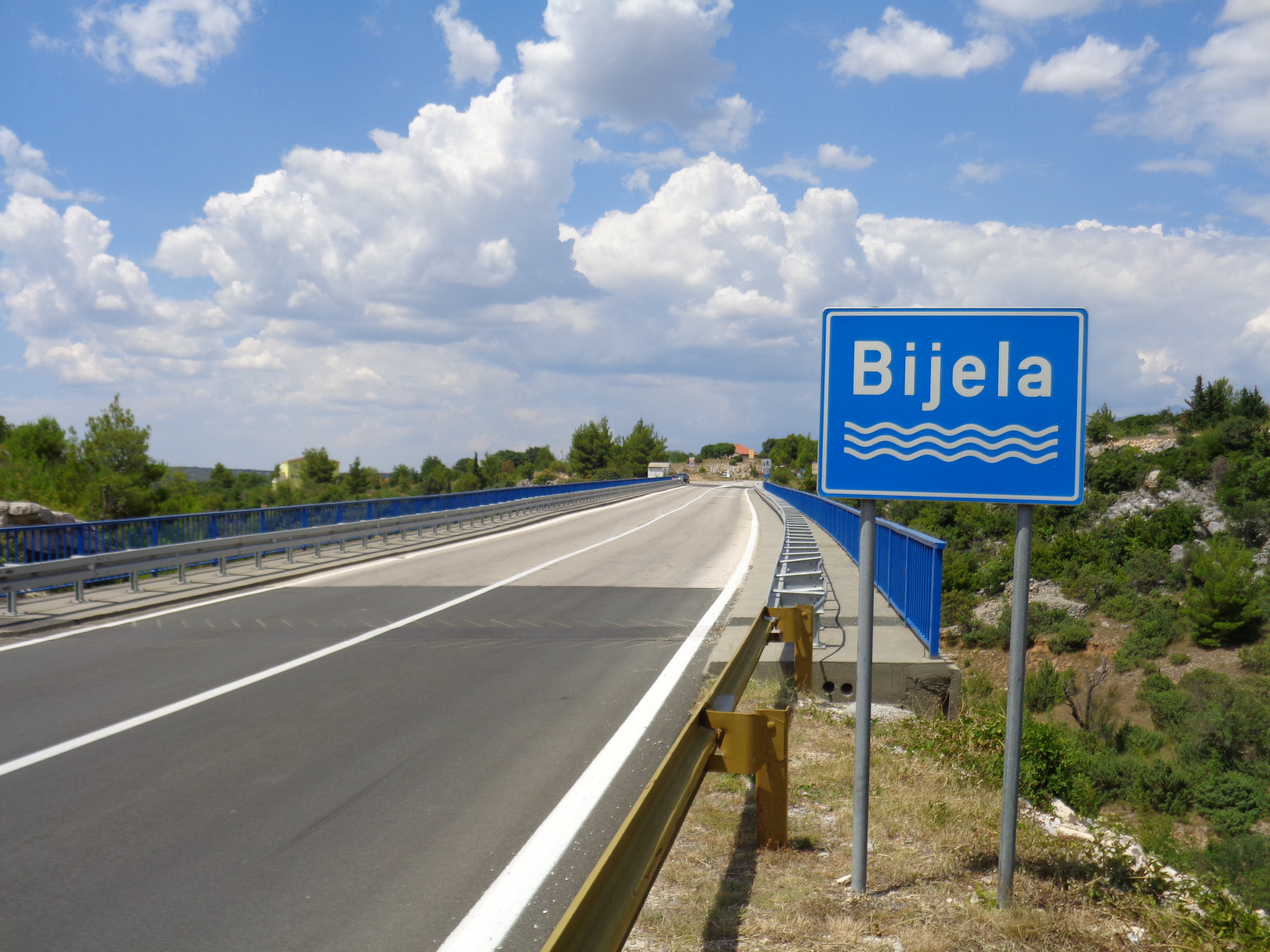
- Road bridge over the Bijela River at Gornji Karin

Location
- Country: Croatia
- City: Obrovac, Croatia

Physical characteristics
- Source: in Pržun mountain
  - location: east of Gornji Karin, Zadar County, Croatia
  - coordinates: 44°08′16″N 15°39′40″E
  - elevation: ~ 300 m
- Mouth: west of Gornji Karin, Zadar County, Croatia
  - location: Croatia
  - coordinates: 44°08′00″N 15°37′20″E
- Length: 3 km (1.9 mi)

Basin features
- River system: Adriatic Sea

The Bijela is a river in southern Croatia that flows into the Karin Sea, an inland sea located in the middle part of the Adriatic Sea and the northern part of Dalmatia. Its spring is situated in a vast cave and the river itself is only 3 km (1.9 mi) long, but an hydrographic phenomenon that flows through a peculiar and unique canyon and has a lot of waterfalls and small ponds or pools between them.

== Geography and hydrography ==
Bijela is one of the smallest rivers in northern Dalmatia, flowing from east to west, and enters Karin Sea at Gornji Karin, a village belonging to the Town of Obrovac in the Zadar County. The spring of Bijela is located at an altitude of approximately 300 meters, below the Pržun mountain peak (351 meters above sea level), a part of Orljak, an uneven plateau in Bukovica geographical region, whose highest point is Jurišinka mountain peak (674 m), the topmost peak of Bukovica.

The spring water flows through and out of the cave below huge rocks. In its upper part, the river flows through a deep canyon characterized by steep slopes and a series of small and medium-sized waterfalls (highest about 15–20 meters). The canyon was formed in layered limestone, which enable the waterfalls to form natural pools of transparent, greenish or whitish colour of the water. It is the molten limestone that gives the water its whitish colour and that is why the river got its name (Bijela = White).

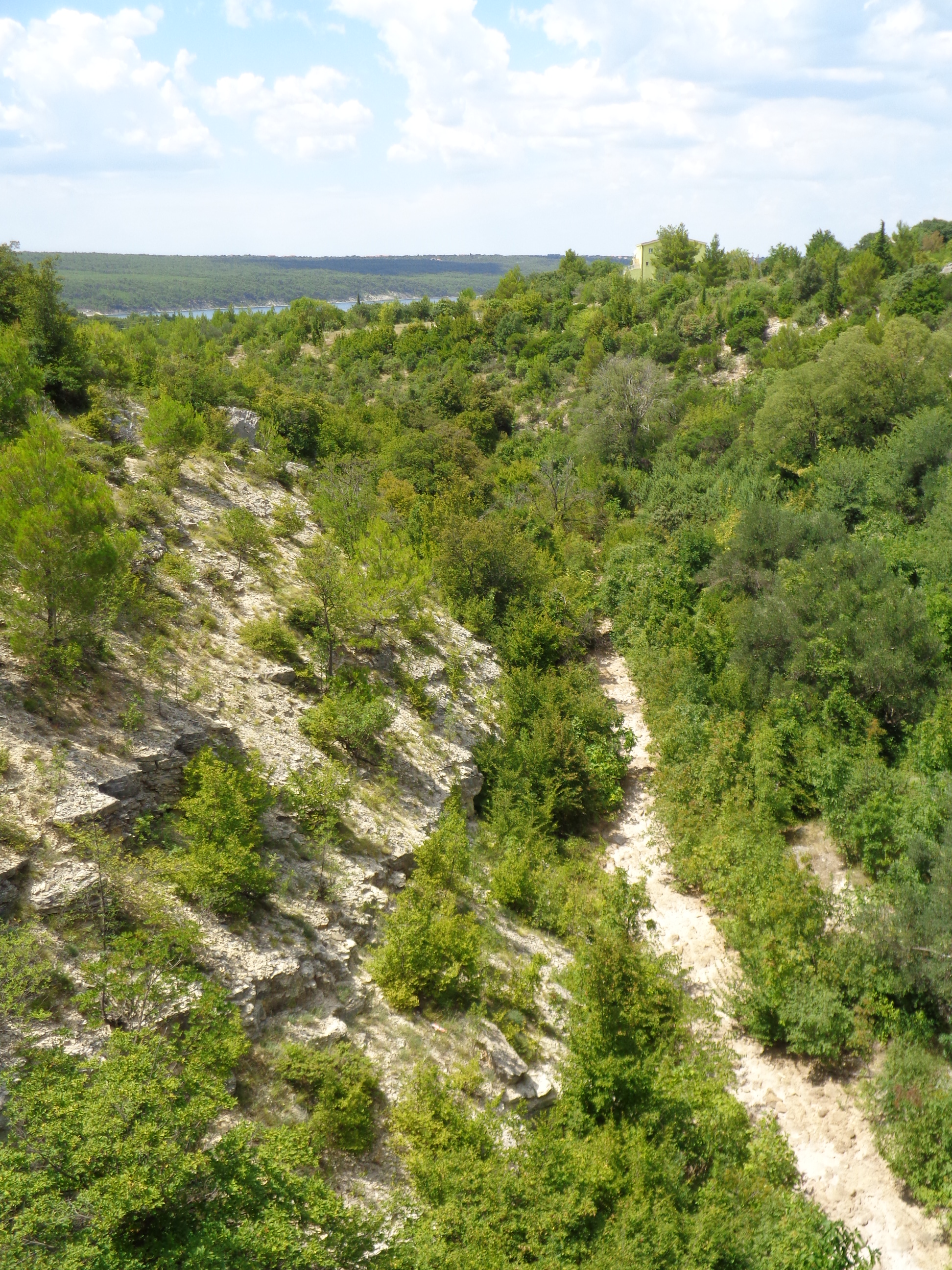
Dry river bed of a part of its lower course in summer, with the Karin Sea in the background

During the dry season though, in summer, the river dries up and only its dry bed remains visible. In its lower course there is an asphalt road and a bridge, connecting villages Gornji Karin and Donji Karin, that overlooks the river bed.

== Points of interest ==
Bijela is a tourist destination, especially its upper course. It offers opportunities for outdoor recreation, relaxation, adventure, discovery and exploration. It is a place for hiking, walking in nature, and photography.

== See also ==
- List of rivers of Croatia
- Zrmanja
- Tourism in Croatia
