= Sastavci =

Sastavci may refer to:

- Sastavci, Serbia, a village near Priboj
- Sastavci, one of the Plitvice Lakes#Waterfalls, in Croatia
- Sastavci, the mouth of the river Krupa (Zrmanja), in Croatia
