= Krnjeza =

River in Dalmatia, Croatia

Krnjezy
- Location within Croatia

Location
- Country: Croatia
- Region: Dalmatia
- District: Bukovica

Physical characteristics
- Source: Vrelo Krnjeze
  - location: Krnješka Glava
  - coordinates: 44°12′4.0″N 15°51′19.1″E
- Mouth: Krupa
  - coordinates: 44°11′27.2″N 15°51′0.7″E
- Length: 06 km (3.7 mi)

Basin features
- River system: Adriatic

The Krnjeza is a partially intermittent river in Bukovica micro-region of Dalmatia, Croatia. It is a right tributary of the river Krupa, which flows into the lower Zrmanja River.

== Hydrology ==
The Krnjeza is a short karst river that flows through Bukovica. It is less than one kilometer long, and its first half of the course dries up during the summer months.

=== The source ===
The source of the Krnjez is located at 408 meters above sea level, at the foot of Krnješka Glava, on the slopes of Crnopac. The Krnjeza springs from a huge cave. The spring is 106 meters deep underwater cave and is among the ten deepest karst springs in Croatia. The water is clear and pure from any kind of pollution, which makes it potable.

=== Course features ===
The Krnjez receives the water from Crnopac cave system and Gračačko Polje. The riverbed is filled only during high waters, i.e. sudden snowmelt and heavy rainfall. In the upper course, the Krnjeza flows through a 300-meter deep canyon. After 600 meters of total course, it flows into the Krupa.

== Flora and fauna ==
Krnjeza is home to the coastal catfish (Cottus ferrugineus) and the Zrmanja chub (Squalius zrmanjae). Both species are endemic to the Adriatic basin.

== Exploration and research ==
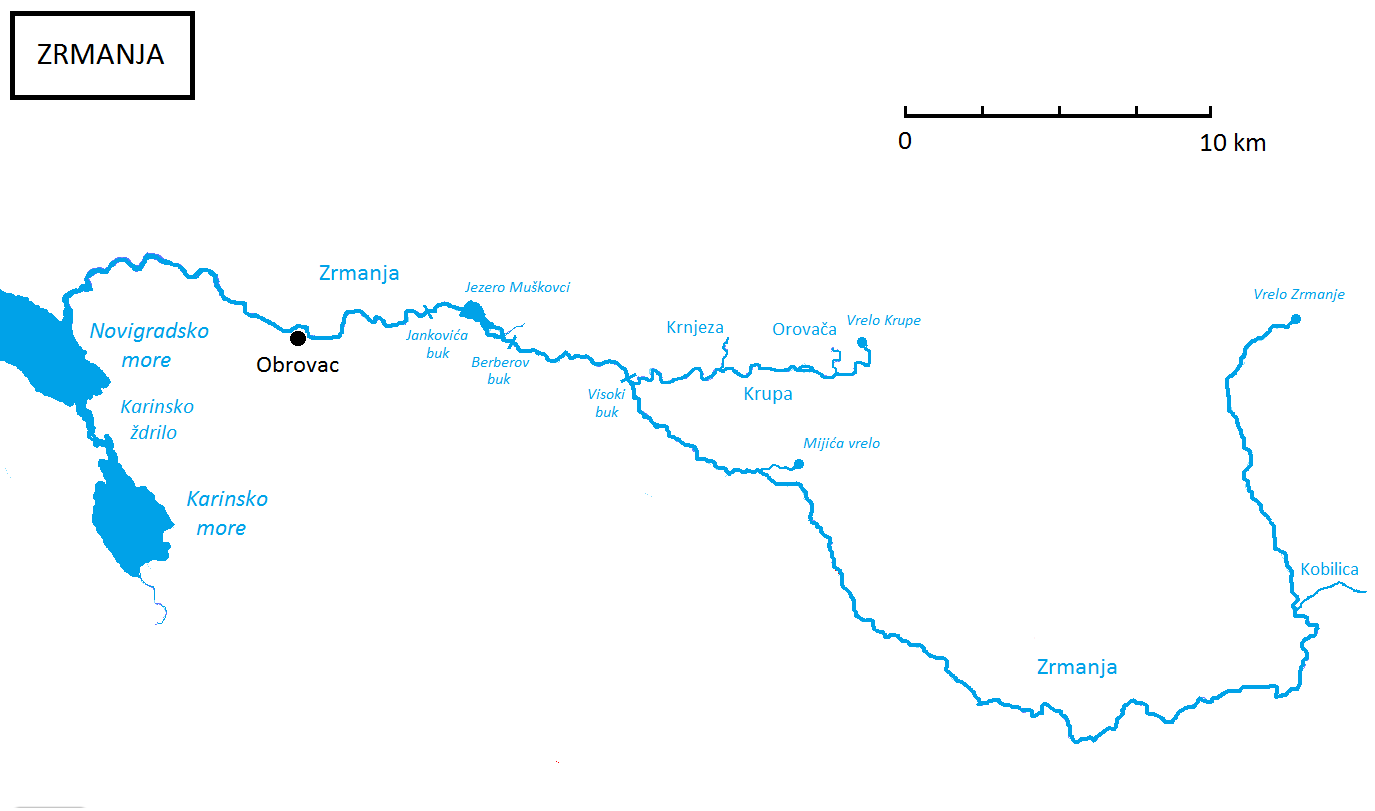
The map of the river Zrmanja basin.

- 1966. The first arrival of speleologist Mladen Garašić, when high water prevents the entrance to the spring-cave.
- 1968. Mladen Garašić, Davor Pavuna, Srđan Novak and Slavko Vrkljan entered the spring-cave.
- 2000. Tihomir Kovačević, Zdravko Međimurac and Ozren Međimurac enter the cave to the siphon.
- 2003. In pre-expedition actions for the International Cave Diving Expedition "Rakovica 2003" Alan Kovačević, Petra Kovač Konrad and Slobodan Meničanin dived to 32 meters. On the mentioned expedition, Alan Kovačević (32 m), Tihomir Zubak (32 m) and Tihomir Kovačević (12 m) dived. The expedition leader was Tihomir Kovačević from the Dinarides - Society for Research and Recording of Karst Phenomena (DDISKF).
- 2008. Tihomir Kovačević from DDISKF organizes the International Cave Diving Expedition “Zrmanjin Buk 2008” on which Luigi Casati dived to a depth of 98 meters. He was assisted by Alen Milošević to a depth of 20 meters in the first siphon. Since the water receded 6 meters below the spring threshold due to drought, the true depth of the spring is 106 meters. A sketch of the spring was made by Luigi Casati.

== Bibliography ==
- Kovačević, Tihomir (2012). "Tajne jezera Sinjac i izvora Krnjeze". Hrvatska vodoprivreda (lipanj / kolovoz). Hrvatska vodoprivreda: 101–104.
- Kovačević, Tihomir (2016). "'Krnjeza - skriveno blago obrovačkog kraja". Scubalife. l (lipanj 2016): 36–51.
- Kovačević, Tihomir (2003). "Velebitu u pohode kroz izvore Zrmanje". Arena (2233/2003): 59–61.
- Kranjčev, Radovan (2004). "Krnjeza - dragulj Bukovice". Hrvatska vodoprivreda. 136 (13): 62–63.
