= Karin Sea =

Inland sea in Croatia, part of the Adriatic Sea

- Karinsko more
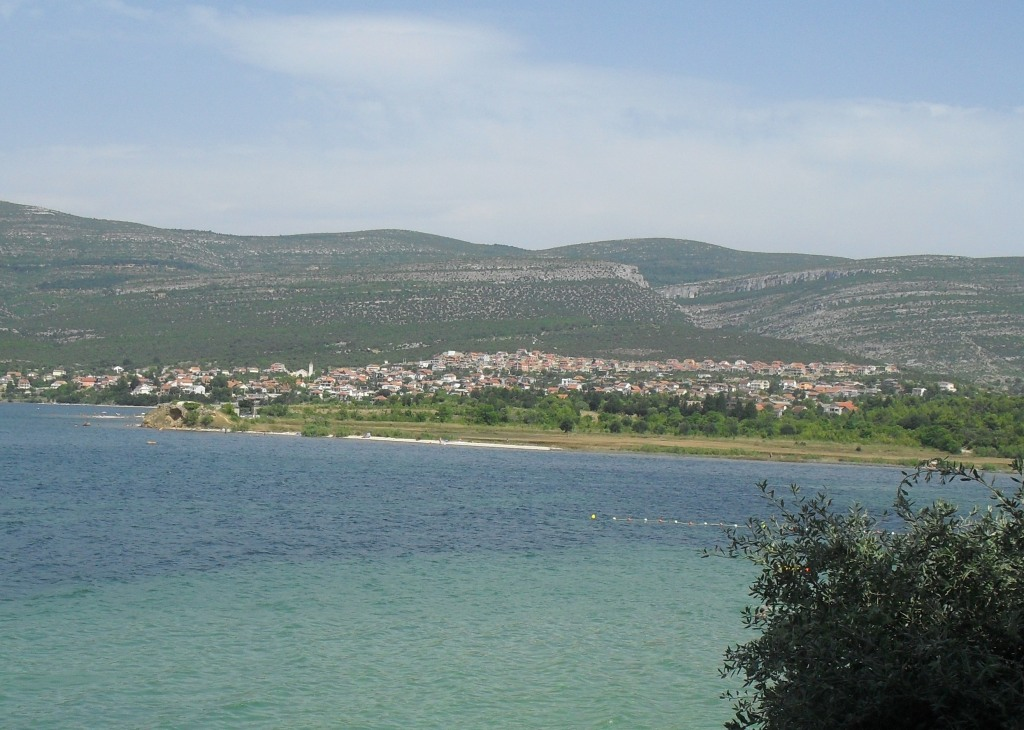
- The southern part of the bay with Gornji Karin
- Interactive map of Karin Sea
- Location: Zadar County
- Coordinates: 44°12′16.53″N 15°31′28.97″E
- Type: Sea
- Part of: Adriatic Sea
- Primary inflows: Karišnica River (Karišnica)
- Basin countries: Croatia
- Max. length: 3.8 km (2.4 mi)
- Max. width: 2.4 km (1.5 mi)
- Surface area: 5.4 km^{2} (2.1 sq mi)
- Average depth: 11 m (36 ft)
- Water volume: 0.04 km^{3} (0.0096 cu mi)

The bay or Sea of Karin or Karin Sea (in Croatian Karinsko more) is an inland sea southeast of the Novigrad Sea, in northern Dalmatia, Croatia. It is located east of the city of Zadar.

The territory of the bay is divided among the municipalities of Novigrad, Obrovac, and Benkovac. The village of Gornji Karin, which gives the inlet its name, is located in the southeastern part and is divided into several hamlets: Donji Karin (Donji Karin) belongs to the municipality of Benkovac, while Karin Gornji (Karin Gornji) and Karin-Slana belong to the municipality of Obrovac.

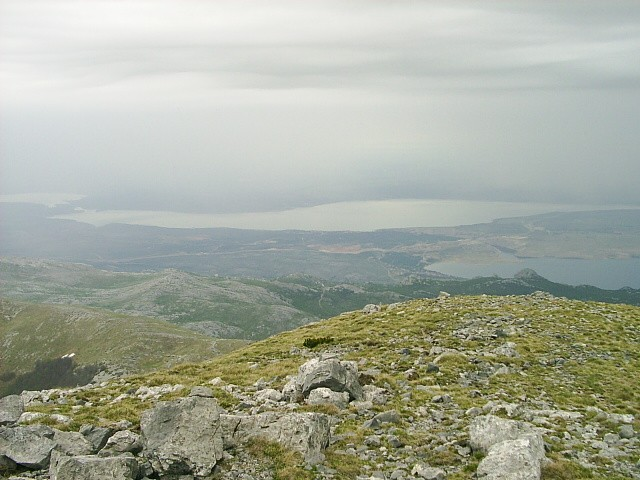
Sea of Karin (left), Novegradi Sea (center), and the end of the Velebit Channel (right).

== Geography ==
Southeast of the Novegradi Sea, the narrow Karinsko Ždrilo channel or Karin Strait (Karinsko Ždrilo), about two kilometers long and 100 to 200 meters wide, leads to the Bay of Karin. On the eastern side of the channel lies the village of Vozarica.

The Sea of Karin has an area of 5.4 km², measures 3.8 km by 2.4 km, and has a maximum depth of 11 m. Its main inflow is the Karišnica River (Karišnica), which flows into the southern part of the bay east of Donji Karin.

In a cove in the northwest part, south of Barbakan Point, lies the small Karinski Školj (Karinski Školj), about 180 m from the coast.

== Bibliography ==
- Alberi, Dario (2008). Dalmazia. Storia, arte, cultura [Dalmatia. History, Art, Culture] (in Italian). Trebaseleghe (PD): Lint Editoriale. ISBN 978-888-190-244-6.
- Rizzi, Alberto (2010). Guida della Dalmazia [Guide to Dalmatia] (in Italian). Vol. I. Trieste: Italo Svevo. ISBN 978-88-6268-060-8.
- Marieni, Giacomo (1845). i.r. Istituto Geografico Militare (ed.). Portolano del mare Adriatico [Pilot Book of the Adriatic Sea] (in Italian) (2nd ed.). Vienna: Tipografia dei PP. Mechitaristi.

=== Cartography ===
- "Mappa topografica della Croazia 1:25000" [Topographic Map of Croatia 1:25000] (in Croatian).
- Carta di cabottaggio del mare Adriatico [Coastal Map of the Adriatic Sea] (in Italian). Vol. sheet VII. Milan: Istituto Geografico Militare. 1822–1824.
