= Prso =

Prso or PRSO may refer to:

- Dado Pršo (born 1974), Croatian footballer
- Milan Pršo (born 1990), Serbian footballer
- Puerto Rico Symphony Orchestra
