= Krupa (Zrmanja) =

River in Dalmatia, Croatia

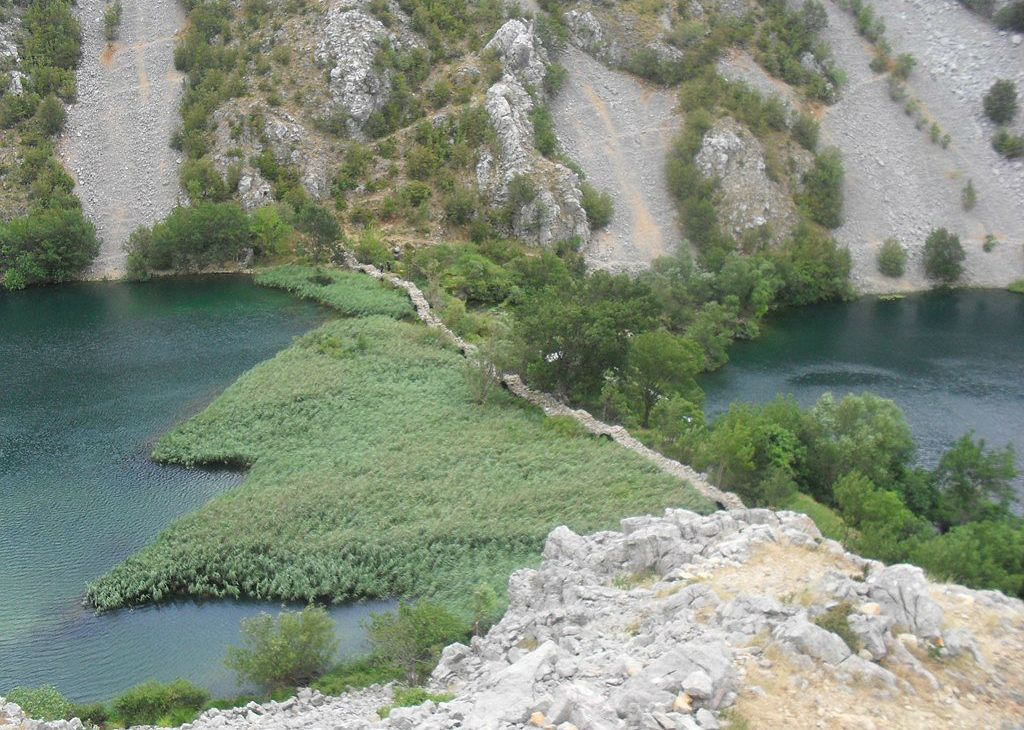
- Kude's Bridge on the Krupa

- Location within Croatia

Location
- Country: Croatia
- Region: Dalmatia
- District: Bukovica

Physical characteristics
- Source: Vrelo Krupe
  - location: Krupa
  - coordinates: 44°11′49.2″N 15°54′32.4″E
- 2nd source: Vrelo2
  - location: Krupa
  - coordinates: 44°11′45.2″N 15°54′37.8″E
- Mouth: Zrmanja
  - location: Sastavci
  - coordinates: 44°11′11.0″N 15°48′52.6″E
- Length: 108 km (67 mi)

Basin features
- River system: Adriatic
- Landmarks: Krupa Monastery
- Tributaries
  - right: Orlovača, Krnjeza
- Waterfalls: Babin Slap
- Bridges: Kude's Bridge

The Krupa is a river in Bukovica region, in northern Dalmatia, Croatia. It rises near the village of Krupa, and flows into the Zrmanja river near Sastavci (lit. 'Confluence'). The Krupa is the right and longest tributary of the Zrmanja River.

== Hydro and geomorphological characteristics and features ==
The Krupa River is the longest tributary of the Zrmanja River.

It rises under the southern slopes of Velebit, near the Krupa village hamlet of Mandići, from two typical karst springs, and here passes by the Orthodox Krupa Monastery. After passing monastery and its luke (riverside meadows), where Krupa receives its first tributary, the Orovača, the river flows in a westerly direction through a 50-meter deep cuts in the rocks, forming first stretch of its canyon on the 10.8 km long way to Zrmanja.

=== Tributaries ===
The first tributary is the water rich Orovača stream, which flows into Krupa from the right, just before it enters monastery plains.

Approximately halfway along its course total length, it receives its second tributary, the Krnjeza, almost at 90-degree angle from the right. The Krnjeza springs out from a huge cave at the foot of Velebit and after a short course flow into the Krupa. It is the shortest river in Bukovica region, only 600 meters long, and in places up to 45 meters deep, with a very cold and clear waters, which is potable.

=== Features ===
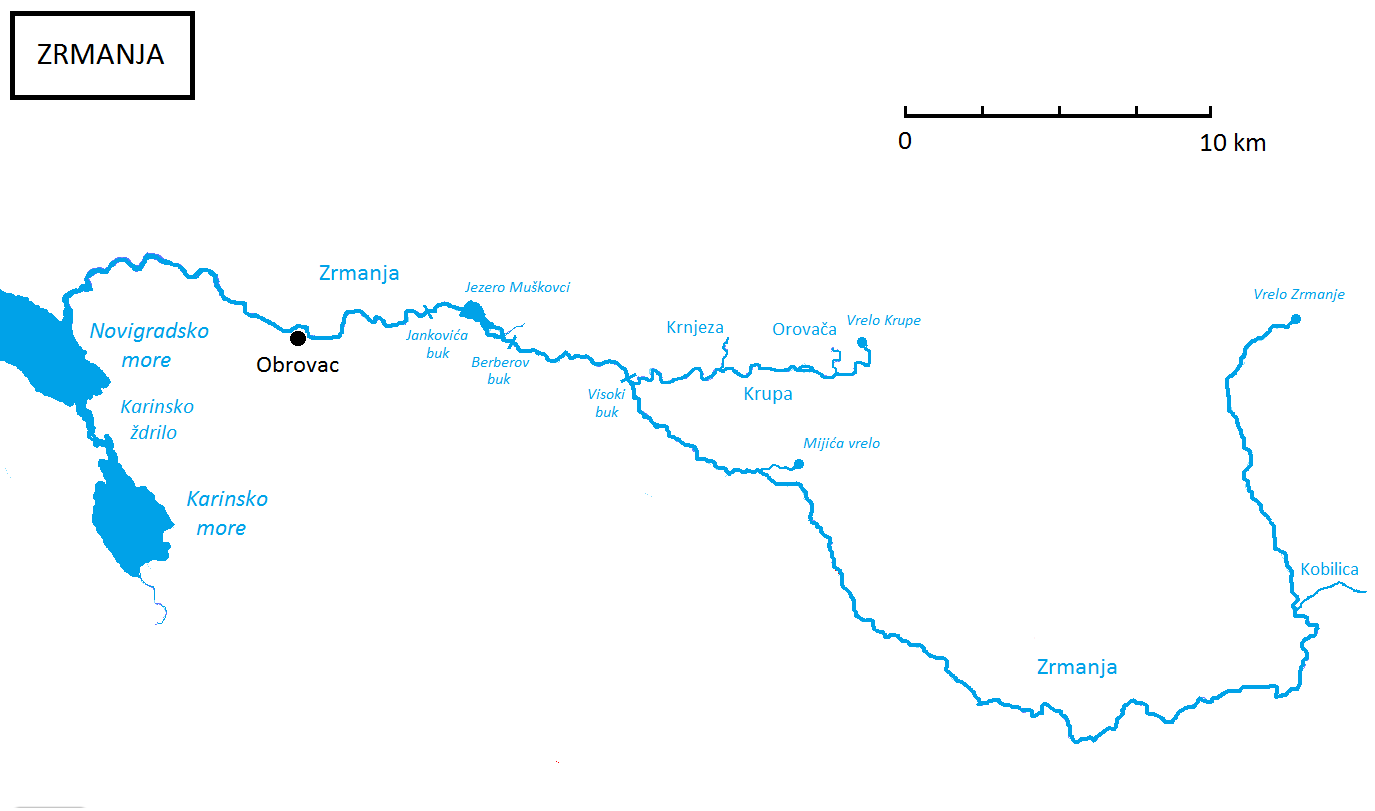
The map of the river Zrmanja basin.

Along its course, the Krupa has built 19 waterfalls (if counting the Deveterac cascades as individual waterfalls), most of which, in terms of height and shape, are among the most impressive waterfalls in Croatia and the Balkans. Downstream from the confluence of the Krnjeza, the narrow Krupa canyon suddenly opens up into a vast grassy travertine barrier called Deveterac. Deveterac got its name from the nine travertine cascades that end in a 13-meter-high waterfall over which the Kudin Most (Kude's Bridge) crosses. Although the last two arches on the left have been significantly damaged, the Kude's Bridge still defies time and high waters. Panin Buk (buk = a small cascade or series of closely packed rapids) follows, after which the canyon in the Veliča Luka area descends slightly, but only briefly. Already at the Punta peak, which drops sharply all the way to the river and forcing it to make almost a semi-circled turn, the canyon again reaches an enviable height, squeezing the river with a steep rock faces at the foot of Babin Grad into a narrow strait in which three waterfalls have been lined up, the last of which is the 12-meter Babin Slap (Grandma's Waterfall) and the 8-meter-high Dragičevića Buk. Below Dragičevića Buk, the Krupa forms elongated travertine sills, creating another series of picturesque rapids, after which falls over two more smaller waterfalls, and then flows into the Zrmanja River.

== Heritage ==
=== Krupa Monastery ===
The Krupa Monastery, built in 1317 on the Krupa banks, as well as the Kude's Bridge, are both protected cultural monument. Kude's Bridge was built in a drystone, at the turn of the 18th and 19th centuries. The bridge is 109 meters long, with an average width of 1.5 meters. It consists of 12 arches made of tufa that alternate with stone sections, as well as two water culverts. When the Krupa floods, it floods the entire bridge, which is why the last two left arches are significantly damaged. The bridge's natural protection is the sedge that grows on the upstream side. According to legend, the bridge was built by Jovan Veselinović, known as Kude, so that he and his wedding party could come to propose to his girlfriend.

=== Watermills ===
The local population used the Krupa River at its source to power mills and irrigate gardens. One of the most famous mills is the so-called Urošev Mlin, which is still in use, although it was built in 1913.

== See also ==
- List of rivers in Croatia

== Gallery ==
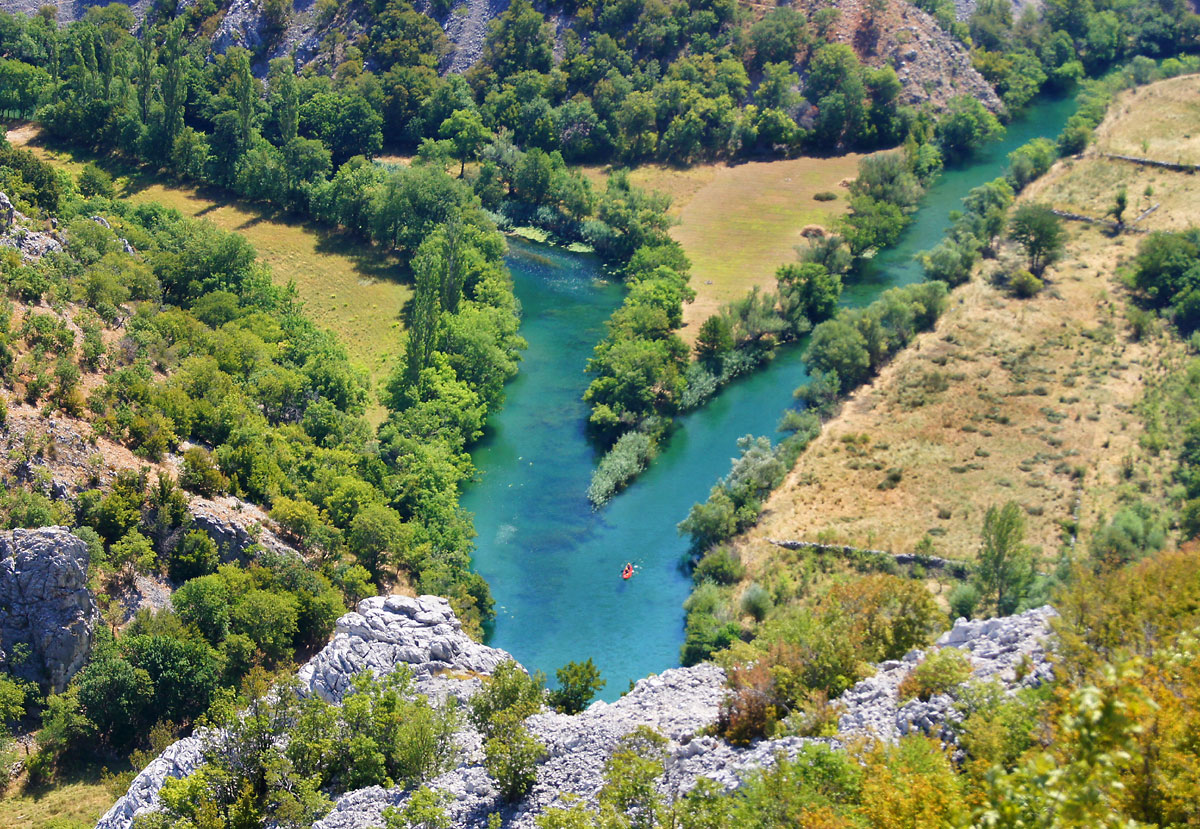
Confluence of Zrmanja and Krupa

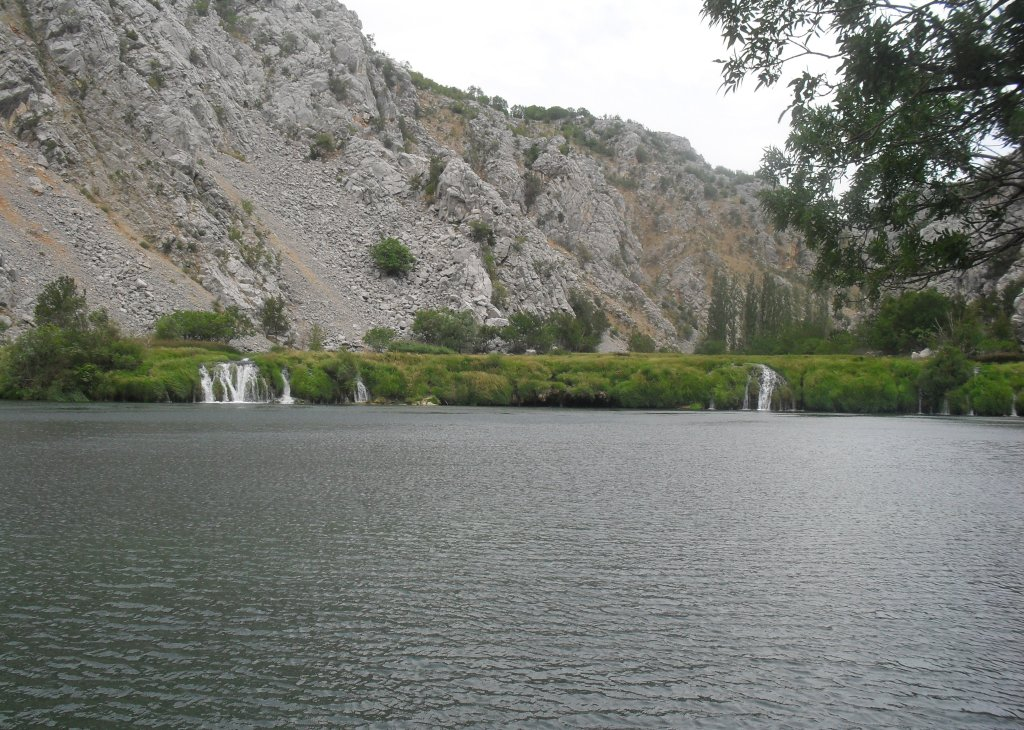
Krupa River

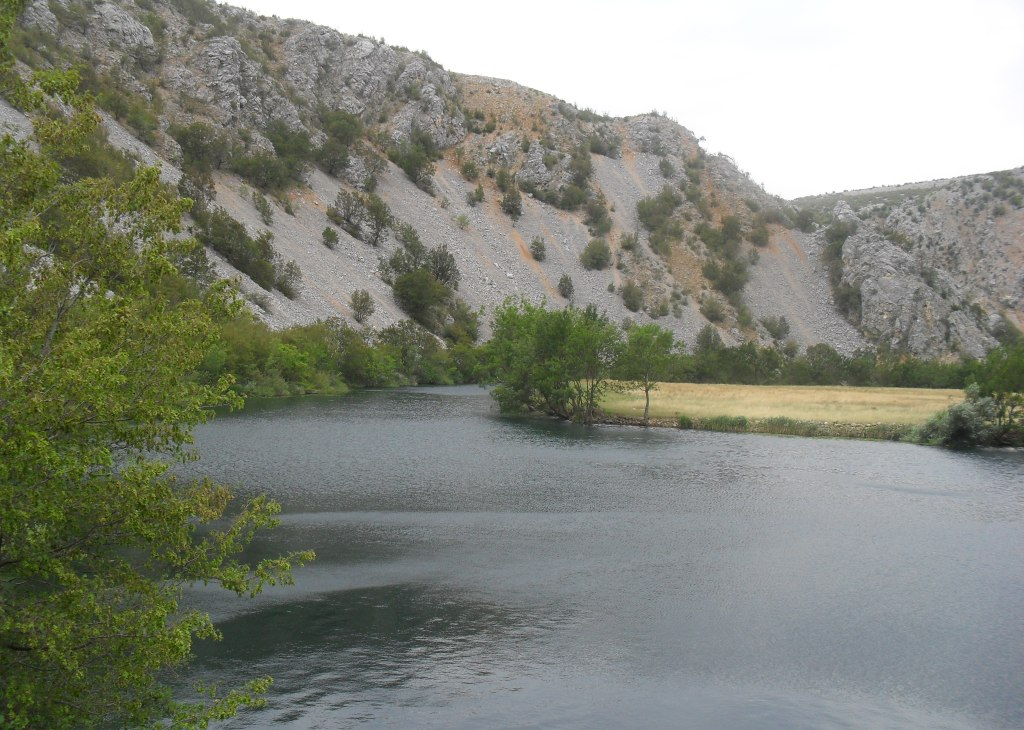
Krupa River
