= Golubić, Zadar County =

Settlement in Zadar County, Croatia

Golubić
- Settlement
- Interactive map of Golubić
- Location of Golubić in Croatia
- Coordinates: 44°11′58″N 15°49′13″E
- Country: Croatia
- County: Zadar County
- City: Obrovac

Area
  - Total: 31.9 km^{2} (12.3 sq mi)

Population (2021)
  - Total: 101
  - Density: 3.17/km^{2} (8.20/sq mi)
- Time zone: UTC+1 (CET)
  - Summer (DST): UTC+2 (CEST)
- Postal code: 23450 Obrovac

Golubić is a settlement in the City of Obrovac in Croatia. In 2021, its population was 101.

== Demographics ==
Golubić: Population trends 1857–2021
v

population	357	428	483	489	573	682	639	720	663	704	674	595	505	478	36	132	101
	1857	1869	1880	1890	1900	1910	1921	1931	1948	1953	1961	1971	1981	1991	2001	2011	2021

Sources: Croatian Bureau of Statistics publications
