= Muškovci =

Settlement in Zadar County, Croatia

- Settlement
- Interactive map of Muškovci
- Location of Muškovci in Croatia
- Coordinates: 44°13′12″N 15°44′12″E
- Country: Croatia
- County: Zadar County
- City: Obrovac

Area
  - Total: 39.6 km^{2} (15.3 sq mi)

Population (2021)
  - Total: 98
  - Density: 2.5/km^{2} (6.4/sq mi)
- Time zone: UTC+1 (CET)
  - Summer (DST): UTC+2 (CEST)
- Postal code: 23450 Obrovac

Muškovci is a settlement in the City of Obrovac in Croatia. In 2021, its population was 98.

== Demographics ==
Muškovci: Population trends 1857–2021
v

| population | 324 | 400 | 422 | 447 | 522 | 607 | 571 | 580 | 408 | 478 | 519 | 549 | 588 | 543 | 47 | 100 | 98 |
| | 1857 | 1869 | 1880 | 1890 | 1900 | 1910 | 1921 | 1931 | 1948 | 1953 | 1961 | 1971 | 1981 | 1991 | 2001 | 2011 | 2021 |

Sources: Croatian Bureau of Statistics publications
