= Gerasim Zelić =

Serbian archimandrite and writer

Gerasim Zelić Герасим Зелић
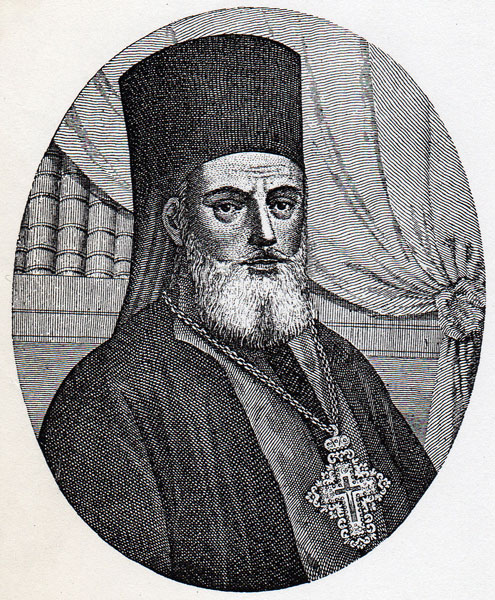
- Born: 11 June 1752 Žegar, Bukovica, Habsburg Empire (modern Obrovac, Croatia)
- Died: 26 March 1828 (aged 75) Buda, Hungary
- Resting place: Krupa monastery

Gerasim Zelić (Serbian: Герасим Зелић; 1752–1828) was a Serbian Orthodox Church archimandrite, traveller and writer. His chief work is Žitije (Lives), in three volumes. They are memoirs of his travels throughout western Europe, Russia and Asia Minor from the latter half of the 18th century to the first decade of the 19th century and the famous personalities (Napoleon, Eugène de Beauharnais, Viceroy of Italy, Joseph II, Holy Roman Emperor, Leopold II, Holy Roman Emperor, Francis II, Holy Roman Emperor, Semyon Zorich, Catherine the Great, Alexander I of Russia, Stanisław August Poniatowski, Dositej Obradović) he encountered. He left behind invaluable original notes on the people, religions, manners, customs, and trade of his era.

As much as Dositej Obradović is an emblematic figure of the 18th century Habsburg Serbian Enlightenment so is Gerasim Zelić. In many ways the east–west travel itineraries of the two men are similar, covering the Levant, the German lands, France and Russia, though Zelić went first to Russia (rather than to the Levant). While both lament their people's plight under the Ottoman rule and promote similar solutions, their perspectives are different, Dositej's cosmopolitanism contrasting with Zelić's clericalism, though their intentions are the same: the emancipation of their people from under the tyrannical yoke of the two empires, the Habsburg and the Ottoman.

Zelić was one of the earliest members of the Serbian Learned Society, better known as Matica srpska, founded at Budapest in 1826.

== Life ==
Ćirilo Zelić was born on 11 June 1752 in the village of Žegar, in the Žegar region, located in the Venetian-Ottoman frontier of Venetian Dalmatia. His father was Andreja and mother Jovana. He learnt to read from nun Ana in his village and was then further educated at Krupa and Krka monasteries. He took the name Gerasim upon monastic vows, and became a deacon in Stanjevići by Montenegrin vladika Sava Petrović on 3 June 1774. He stayed in Krupa, working under the hegumen. On 2 march 1778 he was made a priest, in Plaški by vladika Petar Petrović. Zelić spent some time in Syrmia and Bačka, then returned to Krupa. In 1782 he planned to go for Corfu to learn to paint icons, however, while staying in Venice his friends there told him to go to Russia. He arrived in Novorossiya (former Novoserbia) on 30 June 1782 and met many Serbs. He learnt to paint icons in Kiev, but it did not suit him, so he went to Constantinople and then to Mount Athos where he learnt Greek. He stayed in Constantinople and was given the archimandrite rank by Jerusalem Patriarch Abraham on 19 June 1785.

Zelić returned to Krupa and was recognized as the archimandrite. He then travelled to Russia again, via Austria and Poland, meeting Polish king Stanisław August Poniatowski. In Kiev, he met Russian empress Catherine II and Austrian emperor Joseph II. In St. Petersburg and Moscow he received donations for the Krupa monastery, which he gave upon his return in 1789. Some in Dalmatia accused him of being an enemy of the state and reported him to the authorities, and he was forced to flee to Trieste and then Vienna. He was safe to return and in 1796 he was named main "Vicar for affairs of the Orthodox Church in Dalmatia", as the Venetian authorities did not respect Orthodox bishops.

The Orthodox population in Dalmatia was pressured by the Republic of Venice to emigrate from the Venetian Dalmatia, through Catholic propaganda and Uniatization. The Habsburg Monarchy sought to populate their desolate lands and used the Habsburg Orthodox leadership to invite Orthodox Dalmatians, promising religious freedom. In the 1771–74 period some 634 families migrated according to archives; Gerasim Zelić, a witness to this, claimed 1,000 families migrating to Syrmia and Banat, and Ottoman Bosnia, explicitly due to Uniatization.

== Works ==
- Zelić, Gerasim (1897). Житије Герасима Зелића. Vol. 1. Штампано у Држ. штампарији Краљевине Србије.
- Zelić, Gerasim (1898). Житије Герасима Зелића. Vol. 2. Штампано у Држ. штампарији Краљевине Србије.

== See also ==
- Sava Ljubiša (fl. 1798–d. 1842), Serbian Orthodox archimandrite and Montenegrin envoy to Russia

== Sources ==
- Cvjetković, Kiril (1898). Аутобиографија протосинђела Кирила Цвјетковића и његово страдање за православље. Штампано у Држ. штампарији Краљевине Србије.
- Jačov, Marko (1984). Венеција и Срби у Далмацији у XVIII веку. Историјски институт, Просвета.
- Jačov, Marko (1980). "Одсељавање Срба из Далмације 1771-1774 године". Историјски часопис. 27. Историјски институт, Просвета – via Google Books (read free of charge).
- Milićević, Milan Đ. (1888). Поменик знаменитих људи у српског народа новијега доба. Издање Чупићеве задужбине. pp. 175–177 – via Archive.org.
