= Kaštel Žegarski =

- Village
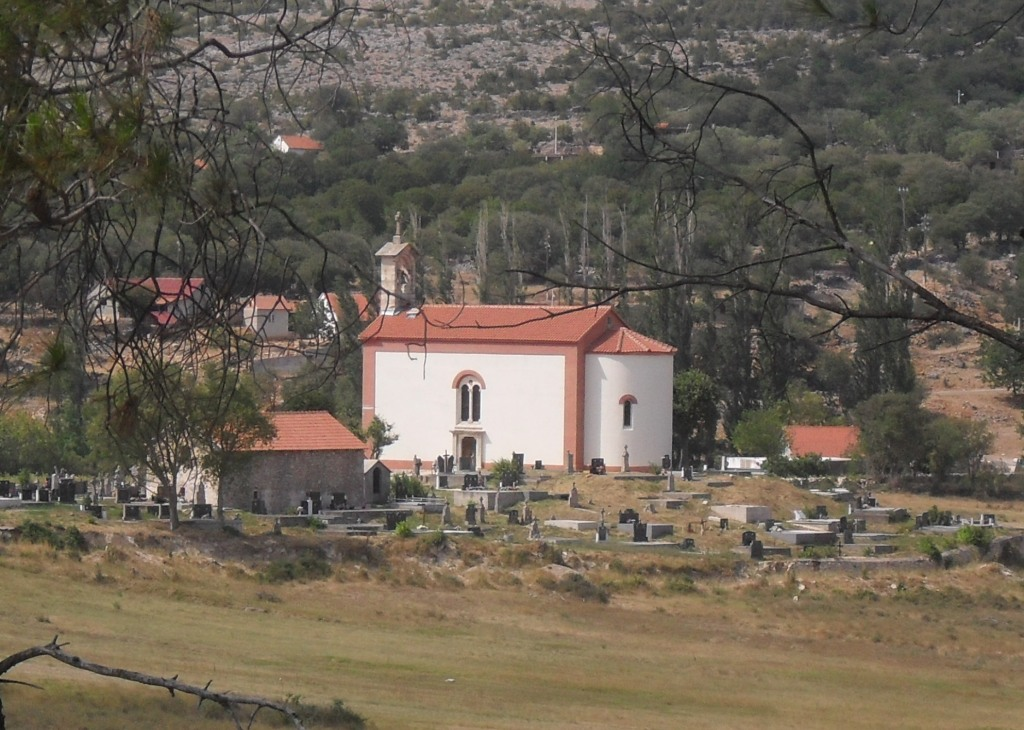
- Serb Orthodox church
- Interactive map of Kaštel Žegarski
- Location within Croatia
- Coordinates: 44°9′18″N 15°51′29″E
- Country: Croatia
- County: Zadar County
- Municipality: Obrovac, Croatia

Area
  - Total: 7.9 km^{2} (3.1 sq mi)
- Elevation: 76 m (249 ft)

Population (2021)
  - Total: 122
  - Density: 15/km^{2} (40/sq mi)
- Time zone: UTC+1 (CET)
- Postal code: 23451
- Area code: 023

Kaštel Žegarski (German: Schegar) is a village in northern Dalmatia which lies within the administrative area of Obrovac in Zadar County, Croatia.

== Location ==
It lies 15 kilometres (9 mi) south-southeast of Obrovac, 9 kilometres (6 mi) northeast of Ervenik and a short distance south of the Zrmanja River.

== Population/Demographics ==
The highest population of Kaštel Žegarski was 1,832 recorded in the census of 1921. In the census of 1991, Kaštel Žegarski had 480 inhabitants, almost all of whom were Serbs. The 2001 census recorded 53 residents. The 2011 census recorded 135 residents.

The Orthodox Church of Saint George, established in 1618, is located in the village.

From 1990 to 1995, Kaštel Žegarski was in the area controlled by the Republic of Serbian Krajina, the Serbian separatist movement.
