= Astrit Ajdarević =

Swedish-Albanian footballer (born 1990)

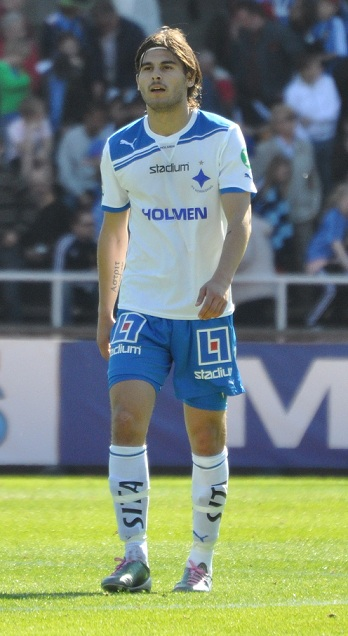
- Ajdarević playing for IFK Norrköping in 2011

Personal information
- Full name: Astrit Agim Ajdarević (Albanian: Astrit Agim Hajdari)
- Date of birth: 17 April 1990 (age 36)
- Place of birth: Pristina, SR Serbia, SFR Yugoslavia
- Height: 1.90 m (6 ft 3 in)
- Position: Midfielder

Youth career
- 1996–2000: Rinia IF
- 2001–2006: Falkenbergs FF
- 2007–2009: Liverpool

Senior career*
Years	Team	Apps	(Gls)
2006	Falkenbergs FF	5	(0)
2009	Liverpool	0	(0)
2009	→ Leicester City (loan)	5	(0)
2009–2010	Leicester City	0	(0)
2010	→ Hereford United (loan)	1	(0)
2010	Örebro SK	13	(5)
2011–2012	IFK Norrköping	40	(6)
2012–2015	Standard Liège	26	(2)
2014	→ Charlton Athletic (loan)	19	(2)
2015	→ Helsingborgs IF (loan)	13	(1)
2015–2016	Örebro SK	35	(6)
2016–2018	AEK Athens	35	(1)
2019–2020	Djurgårdens IF	30	(0)
2021	Akropolis IF	8	(0)
2026	Sollentuna FK	1	(0)
Total		231	(23)

International career
2005–2007	Sweden U17	20	(7)
2008–2010	Sweden U19	18	(2)
2011–2012	Sweden U21	15	(2)
2016	Sweden Olympic (O.P.)	3	(1)
2017	Albania	1	(0)
- * Club domestic league appearances and goals as of 20:40, 14 February 2022 (UTC)

Astrit Agim Ajdarević (Albanian pronunciation: [asˈtrid ajˈdarevic]; born 17 April 1990) is a former professional footballer who played as a midfielder. He most recently played for Akropolis IF. Having represented the Sweden U17, U19, U21, and Olympic teams, he made his full international debut for Albania in 2017.

== Early and personal life ==
Born in Pristina to Albanian parents originally from Medveđa, he moved with his family to Sweden in 1992. The family name was Hajdari but since his father played in Yugoslavian league, they switched it to "Ajdarević". His father Agim Ajdarević was a member of FK Spartak Subotica in the Yugoslav First League in the 1980s and 1990s, and moved to Sweden in 1992; he later signed with Falkenbergs FF.

His younger brothers, Arben and Alfred, are also footballers. Ajdarević said he considers himself Albanian.

Ajdarević is married to Albanian model Mimoza Ponosheci. In September 2018, he became a father when Mimoza gave birth to twins.

== Club career ==
=== Early career ===
Ajdarević began his career in 1996 in his adopted nation of Sweden. He first played for Rinia IF, and later signed with Falkenbergs FF, where he played in the 2006 season, making five appearances for the side.

=== Liverpool FC ===
On 5 December 2006, Ajdarević completed a second trial at Liverpool and transferred soon afterwards to the club, having impressed the club's coaching staff. He made his Liverpool youth team debut in the FA Youth Cup victory against Reading in January 2007. However, Ajdarević was unable to make a breakthrough into the first team at Liverpool.

==== Loan to Leicester City ====
Ajdarević joined Leicester City on trial in January 2009 and signed for the Foxes on the loan signing deadline for football league clubs on 26 March 2009 until the end of that season, when the Midlands-based club had the option to sign him permanently. He made his debut as a second-half substitute replacing Max Gradel after 70 minutes of Leicester's 2–2 draw with Carlisle United at the Walkers Stadium.

=== Leicester City ===
On 30 June 2009, Ajdarević joined Leicester permanently having been released by Liverpool, signing a one-year deal. However, Ajdarević struggled in the first team at Leicester City and a result, he went on trial at Brighton & Hove Albion.

==== Loan to Hereford ====
After a trial, Ajdarević joined Hereford United on loan until the end of the season, linking up with Leicester teammate Craig King on 25 March 2010. Ajdarević made his debut for the club on 3 April 2010, where he came on as a substitute and played 16 minutes, in a 2–1 win over Barnet. This turns out to be his only appearance for Hereford United, as he suffered a hamstring injury.

==== Release ====
On 17 May 2010, Ajdarević was released by Leicester City, along with Stephen Clemence, Levi Porter, Robbie Burns, Carl Pentney, Billy Kee and Alex Cisak.

=== Örebro SK ===
Ajdarević returned to Sweden in June 2010 and trained with Örebro SK before being offered a contract with them in early July.

Ajdarević made an impact on his debut when he scored his first goal for the club on 18 July 2010, in a 3–3 draw against IF Elfsborg on 18 July 2010, which was followed up in the next game on 26 July 2010 against Elfsborg for the second time this season, which Örebro win 3–0. Later in the 2010 season, Ajdarević scored two more goals against Brommapojkarna, which saw them draw 1–1 on 25 October 2010, and Göteborg, which turned out to be his last appearance on 1 January 2011. Ajdarević established himself in the first team at the club, where he scored five times in thirteen appearances.

=== IFK Norrköping ===
Ajdarević used a contractual clause that allowed him to find another club after the 2010 season had ended and despite Örebro SK's attempt to keep him by offering a new contract, IFK Norrköping managed to sign a long-term deal with the midfielder. Previously, Ajdarević had also been linked with a move to Italian side Cesena.

Ajdarević made his debut for the club, in the opening game of the season, in a 2–0 win over GAIS. In a match against his former club Örebro SK on 25 May 2011, Ajdarević was booed by Örebro's supporters throughout and even displayed a banner about him, which saw IFK Norrköping lose 2–0. Ajdarević then scored his first goal for the club, in a 2–2 draw against BK Häcken on 10 June 2011 and his second then came on 27 June 2011, in a 2–1 loss against Kalmar. Ajdarević went on to score two more goals later in the season against Trelleborg and Halmstad. Like at Örebro SK, Ajdarević established himself in the first team and had a successful season at Norrköping, where he made 29 appearances and scoring four times in all competitions.

Ahead of the 2012 season, Ajdarević was linked with a move to Champions side Helsingborg, but the move never came for it. In the opening game of the season, Ajdarević set up a goal for Gunnar Heiðar Þorvaldsson, in a 1–0 win over Helsingborgs. Ajdarević continued to be in the first team, having played in central midfield and in the last two games of his career, he scored two goals against AIK and Åtvidaberg. By the end of May, Ajdarević made twelve appearances and scoring two times.

=== Standard Liège ===
In late-June, IFK Norrköping agreed to sell Ajdarević to Belgium side Standard Liège with a transfer reportedly cost SEK 15 million and Ajdarević, himself, confirmed via Twitter that he left the club on 1 July 2012. The move was confirmed on 3 July 2012, where he signed a four-year contract.

In the opening game of the season, Ajdarević made his debut, coming on as a substitute for Yoni Buyens, in a 1–0 loss against Zulte Waregem. Several weeks later, on 19 August 2012, Ajdarević scored his first goal in a 6–2 win over Charleroi. In the round of 32 of Belgian Cup, Ajdarević scored and set up a goal for Jelle Van Damme, who scored a winning goal, as Liège beat KV Kortrijk 3–2. Despite becoming a regular in the first team under new manager Ron Jans until his sacking on 22 October 2012, Ajdarević soon lost his first team place later in the season and made 21 appearances and scoring two times in all competitions.

The 2013–14 season saw Ajdarević being kept out of the first team throughout the whole year and made no appearances for the side.

==== Loan to Charlton Athletic ====
Ajdarević signed a six-month loan deal with Charlton Athletic on 3 January 2014. Ajdarević made his first-team debut as a 77th-minute substitute in a 1–0 Championship away defeat to Middlesbrough on 18 January 2014. Seven days later, on 25 January 2014, he made his first start in the 1–0 fourth round of the FA Cup away win against Huddersfield Town. He scored his first and second goals in the month of April with one against Yeovoil Town in a 3–2 win at home and the other in the last minute of a 2–1 defeat to Barnsley, also at home. Despite hopes of joining the club on a permanent basis, Ajdarević returned to the club and made 23 appearances and scoring two times in all competitions. During his time there, Ajdarević was the club's fan favorite.

==== 2014–15 season ====
After his loan spell at Charlton Athletic came to an end, Ajdarević returned to the first team under the management of Guy Luzon and made his first appearance of the season on 25 July 2014, with a 3–0 win over Charleroi in the opening game of the season, followed up by scoring in the next game on 2 August 2014, with a 3–2 win over KV Kortrijk. However, Ajdarević lost his first team place at the club and only made eight appearances in the first half of the season.

==== Loan to Helsingborg ====
On 19 February 2015, Standard Liège loaned Ajdarević to the Sweden club Helsingborgs IF for the rest of the 2014–15 season. Ajdarević made a good start against Västerås SK when he scored his first goal for the club in the first round of Svenska Cupen, with a 4–0 win, on 1 March 2015. The following month on 4 April 2015, Ajdarević made his league debut for the club, in the opening game of the season, in a 0–0 draw against Kalmar. Despite suffering from a leg injury, Ajdarević returned to the first team and then scored his first goal for Helsingborg, in a 2–1 loss against Gefle on 9 May 2015. Ajdarević went on to make thirteen appearances before returning to his parent club in mid-July.

==== Departure ====
On 11 August 2015, Ajdarević left Standard Liège by mutual agreement. However, Ajdarević later stated that Manager Luzon left him out of the squad and ruined him.

=== Örebro SK ===
Two days after leaving Standard Liege, Ajdarević returned to Örebro SK for the 2016 season on 11 August 2015 in his second spell.

Ajdarević made his Örebro SK debut on 15 August 2015, where he made his first start, in a 1–0 loss against GIF Sundsvall. After serving a suspension, he scored on his return, as well as, setting up a goal, in a 2–1 win over Hammarby on 13 September 2015. Later in the season, Ajdarević provided assists, including a double twice in separate matches against Elfsborg, which see them win 4–2 on 21 September 2015 and his second came against Gefle, which see them drew 2–2 on 19 October 2015. Ajdarević finished the season, making twelve appearances. Following this, Ajdarević signed a new contract with the club, keeping him until 2017.

Like the previous season, Ajdarević continued to play as a centre-forward for the side in the 2016 season and then scored his first goal of the season on 11 April 2016, in a 2–1 win over Jönköpings Södra. Ajdarević then scored two more goals against Hammarby IF and Gelfe IF. After playing in the Summer Olympics, Ajdarević returned to the first team, but soon suffered a thigh injury that kept him out for weeks. After returning to the first team, Ajdarević scored on his return on 22 September 2016, in a 3–2 loss against Göteborg. Following a 5–1 defeat to Östersund on 31 October 2016, Ajdarević was verbally abused by a supporter of the club, who told him to leave the club. Ajdarević went on to finish the 2016 season, making 26 appearances and scoring four times in all competitions.

=== AEK Athens ===
On 13 December 2016, Ajdarević signed a contract with Greek side AEK Athens for two and a half years, keeping him until 2019. At the presentation, he was given a number six shirt for AEK Athens. Upon moving to AEK Athens, Ajdarević revealed that he lost seven kilos in just sixteen days.

==== 2016–17 season ====
Ajdarević made his AEK Athens debut on 4 January 2017, where he made his first start and played 85 minutes, in a 0–0 draw against Panetolikos. On 19 February 2017, he scored what proved to be the only goal in a home derby win against Olympiacos. After the match, Ajdarević was named MVP of the match. He became a first team regular for the side under the management of Manuel Jiménez. Despite missing out two matches, due to injury and suspension, Ajdarević went on to make 23 appearances and scoring two times in all competitions. He reflected his season at AEK Athens, speaking positively about his time there so far.

==== 2017–18 season ====
In the 2017–18 season, Ajdarević continued to regain his first team place at the start of the season for the side. In a 4–0 win over AEL on 10 September 2017, he set two of the four goals for the side. The following month, on 26 October 2017, Ajdarević scored his first goal of the season, in a 7–0 win over Apollon Larissa. However, he soon lost his first team place for the side, resulting him being demoted to the substitute bench and his own injury concern. As a result, Ajdarević was linked with a move to a Swiss club during the January transfer window but stayed at AEK Athens as a result of injury sustained in late–January. On 15 February 2018, he scored his first AEK Athens goal in the first leg of the Round of 32 UEFA Europa League, in a 1–1 draw against Dynamo Kyiv. However, in the second leg, AEK Athens were eliminated in the tournament via away goal following a 0–0 draw. At the end of the 2017–18 campaign, the club won the national championship for the first time in 24 years. He went on to make 27 appearances and scoring two times in all competitions.

==== 2018–19 season ====
Ahead of the 2018–19 season, Ajdarević continued to be linked a move away from AEK Athens, as his first team at the club was expected to be limited once more. It was proven correct, as Ajdarević spent the first half of the season away from the first team. But he did one make appearance in the 2018–19 season, which came on 12 October 2018 in the Greek Cup, in a 2–1 win over PAS Lamia. On 30 November 2018, it was announced that Ajdarević had his contract terminated at AEK Athens, with his contract expecting to expire at the end of the 2018–19 season. By the time of his departure, he made fifty–one appearances and scoring three times in all competitions for the side.

=== Djurgårdens IF ===
Ajdarević was presented as a player for Djurgårdens IF on 9 February 2019 during the half time of Djurgårdens IF's first home game of the 2019 season, against Norwegian side Lillestrøm of Eliteserien.

Ajdarević made his Djurgårdens IF debut in the opening game of the season, coming on as a substitute, in a 2–2 draw against GIF Sundsvall. However, he appeared in a number of matches, coming on as a substitute.

== International career ==
Ajdarević was eligible to play for Sweden by upbringing, Kosovo by birth and Albania.

=== Sweden ===
After previously played for Sweden U17 and Sweden U19, Ajdarević made his Sweden U21 debut on 7 October 2010, where he was sent–off for the second bookable offence, in a 1–1 draw against Austria U21. It wasn't until 2 June 2011 when he made another Sweden U21 appearance, in a 4–0 win over Norway U21. The following year on 6 June 2012, Ajdarević scored his first national team goal, in a 4–0 win over Malta U21. Three months later on 10 September 2012, he scored and set up the second goal of the game, in a 2–1 win over Ukraine U21.

Despite hopes of earning attention from the senior team, Ajdarević was on the stand-by instead for the UEFA Euro 2016 and was cut from the squad as a result.

Nevertheless, Ajdarević was called up by Sweden U23 team for 2016 Summer Olympics in Rio de Janeiro, Brazil and was appointed captain soon after. On 4 August 2016, Ajdarević scored in the opening game against Colombia, which saw them draw 2–2. However, in the next two games, Sweden lost against Nigeria U23 and Japan U23, which saw them out of the tournament.

=== Albania ===
In an interview for the Albanian program "Zona Gol" part of SuperSport Albania, Digitalb on 28 October 2017, he admitted that he has promised the Albania national team's coach Christian Panucci to play for Albania. He was called up immediately to Albania by coach Panucci for the friendly match against Turkey on 13 November 2017. He debuted for Albania against Turkey as an 81st-minute substitute for Eros Grezda in a 2–3 away win for his side.

== Career statistics ==
=== Club ===
As of 14 January 2018

Appearances and goals by club, season and competition
Club	Season	League			Cup		Europe (Note: Including continental competitions, such as UEFA Champions League and UEFA Europa League)		Other		Total	
Club	Season	Division	Apps	Goals	Apps	Goals	Apps	Goals	Apps	Goals	Apps	Goals
Falkenbergs FF	2006	Superettan	5	0	—		—		—		5	0
Leicester City (loan)	2008–09	League One	5	0	—		—		—		5	0
Hereford United (loan)	2009–10	League Two	1	0	—		—		—		1	0
Örebro SK	2010	Allsvenskan	13	5	—		—		—		13	5
IFK Norrköping	2011	Allsvenskan	28	4	1	0	—		—		29	4
IFK Norrköping	2012	Allsvenskan	12	2	—		—		—		12	2
IFK Norrköping	Total		40	6	1	0	—		—		41	6
Standard Liège	2012–13	Belgian Pro League	20	1	1	1	—		—		21	2
Standard Liège	2014–15	Belgian Pro League	6	1	—		2	0	—		8	1
Standard Liège	Total		26	2	1	1	2	0	—		29	3
Charlton Athletic (loan)	2013–14	Championship	19	2	3	0	—		—		22	2
Helsingborgs IF (loan)	2015	Allsvenskan	13	1	4	1	—		—		17	2
Örebro SK	2015	Allsvenskan	10	2	1	0	—		—		11	2
Örebro SK	2016	Allsvenskan	25	4	1	1	—		—		26	5
Örebro SK	Total		35	4	2	1	—		—		37	5
AEK Athens	2016–17	Super League Greece	19	1	4	0	—		—		23	1
AEK Athens	2017–18	Super League Greece	15	0	4	1	4	1	—		24	2
AEK Athens	Total		35	1	8	1	4	1	—		47	3
Career total			192	21	19	4	6	1	—		219	26

=== International ===
As of 13 November 2017

Appearances and goals by national team and year
National team	Year	Apps	Goals
Albania	2017	1	0
Total		1	0

== Honours ==
Leicester City

- League One: 2008–09

AEK Athens

- Super League Greece: 2017–18
- Greek Cup runner-up: 2016–17, 2017–18

Djurgårdens IF

- Allsvenskan: 2019
