= Agim Ajdarević =

Kosovo Albanian footballer

Personal information
- Birth name: Agim Hajdari
- Date of birth: 7 May 1969 (age 57)
- Place of birth: Medveđa, SR Serbia, SFR Yugoslavia
- Position: Forward

Senior career*
Years	Team	Apps	(Gls)
1986–1987	Ozren Sokobanja		
1988	Radnički Pirot	11	(5)
1988–1989	Radnički Niš	4	(0)
1989–1990	Liria Prizren	34	(13)
1990–1991	Sloboda Užice	18	(1)
1991–1992	Spartak Subotica	1	(0)
1992–1999	Falkenbergs FF	175	(105)
- * Club domestic league appearances and goals

Agim Ajdarević (Albanian: Agim Hajdari; born 7 May 1969) is a Yugoslav retired footballer.

== Club career ==
He started playing in Serbian lower-league side FK Ozren Sokobanja from where he joined second-level FK Radnički Pirot. Then, he played with Serbian side FK Radnički Niš in the 1988–89 Yugoslav First League, then with Serbian/Kosovar side Liria Prizren in the 1989–90 Yugoslav Second League, then with Serbian side FK Sloboda Užice in the 1990–91 Yugoslav Second League, and finally with Serbian side FK Spartak Subotica in the 1991–92 Yugoslav First League.

In 1992, while on holidays in Sweden, Yugoslav Wars started and Ajdarević family decided to stay. Several Swedish clubs were interested in signing him, but, since he had professional contract with Spartak Subotica, any club would need to pay a transfer-fee. Falkenbergs FF went ahead and Agim Ajdarević in the following years scored 105 goals in 175 games for FFF.

== Personal life ==
The family real surname was Hajdari but Yugoslavian Government switched it to "Ajdarević".

His sons, Astrit Ajdarević born in 1990, Arben Ajdarević born in 1995, and Alfred Ajdarević born in 1998, also became footballers.
