= Komazeci =

Settlement in Zadar County, Croatia

- Settlement
- Interactive map of Komazeci
- Location of Komazeci in Croatia
- Coordinates: 44°08′10″N 15°51′58″E
- Country: Croatia
- County: Zadar County
- City: Obrovac

Area
  - Total: 19.5 km^{2} (7.5 sq mi)

Population (2021)
  - Total: 14
  - Density: 0.72/km^{2} (1.9/sq mi)
- Time zone: UTC+1 (CET)
  - Summer (DST): UTC+2 (CEST)
- Postal code: 23450 Obrovac
- Area code: +385 (0)23

Komazeci is a settlement in the City of Obrovac in Croatia. In 2021, its population was 14.

== Demographics ==
Komazeci: Population trends 1857–2021
v

| population | | | | | | | | | 639 | 621 | 596 | 536 | 435 | 357 | 5 | 42 | 14 |
| | 1857 | 1869 | 1880 | 1890 | 1900 | 1910 | 1921 | 1931 | 1948 | 1953 | 1961 | 1971 | 1981 | 1991 | 2001 | 2011 | 2021 |

Sources: Croatian Bureau of Statistics publications
