= Roy Rudonja =

Slovenian footballer (born 1995)

Personal information
- Date of birth: 26 February 1995 (age 31)
- Place of birth: Koper, Slovenia
- Height: 1.89 m (6 ft 2 in)
- Position: Forward

Youth career
- –2010: Jadran Dekani
- 2011: Leicester City
- 2011–2013: Sheffield Wednesday
- 2014: Domžale

Senior career*
Years	Team	Apps	(Gls)
2013–2014	Domžale	1	(0)
2013	→ Ankaran Hrvatini (loan)	10	(0)
2015	Ankaran Hrvatini	22	(1)
2016	Tolmin	8	(0)
2016	Krško	1	(0)
2017–2018	RKC Waalwijk	1	(0)
2018–2019	Brežice 1919	0	(0)
2019	Drava Ptuj	4	(1)
2020	ASKÖ Oedt	0	(0)
2020–2021	Senglea Athletic	0	(0)
2023	Jadran Dekani	2	(0)

International career
2011–2012	Slovenia U17	10	(0)
2012–2013	Slovenia U18	7	(0)
- * Club domestic league appearances and goals

Roy Rudonja (born 26 February 1995) is a Slovenian former professional footballer who played as a forward.

== Personal life ==
He is the son of Mladen Rudonja, a former Slovenian footballer who represented the Slovenia national team at the 2000 UEFA European Football Championship and 2002 FIFA World Cup tournaments. After ending his professional football career in 2022, he became a rapper under the stage name BigRoy.
