= Bogatnik =

Settlement in Zadar County, Croatia

- Settlement
- Interactive map of Bogatnik
- Location of Bogatnik in Croatia
- Coordinates: 44°09′18″N 15°49′19″E
- Country: Croatia
- County: Zadar County
- City: Obrovac

Area
  - Total: 18.3 km^{2} (7.1 sq mi)

Population (2021)
  - Total: 120
  - Density: 6.6/km^{2} (17/sq mi)
- Time zone: UTC+1 (CET)
  - Summer (DST): UTC+2 (CEST)
- Postal code: 23450 Obrovac
- Area code: +385 (0)23

Bogatnik is a settlement in the City of Obrovac in Croatia. In 2021, its population was 120.

== Demographics ==
Bogatnik: Population trends 1857–2021
v

population			343	361	451	543		355	601	592	581	531	482	470	74	131	120
	1857	1869	1880	1890	1900	1910	1921	1931	1948	1953	1961	1971	1981	1991	2001	2011	2021

Sources: Croatian Bureau of Statistics publications
