= Dragiša Gudelj =

Serbian footballer (born 1997)

Personal information
- Date of birth: 8 November 1997 (age 29)
- Place of birth: Breda, Netherlands
- Height: 1.86 m (6 ft 1 in)
- Position: Centre-back

Youth career
- 2011–2015: NAC Breda

Senior career*
| Years | Team | Apps | (Gls) |
| 2015–2017 | Jong Ajax | 0 | (0) |
| 2017–2018 | Wohlen | 31 | (2) |
| 2018–2020 | Vitória Guimarães B | 17 | (2) |
| 2020–2022 | Cádiz B | 31 | (3) |
| 2022–2024 | Córdoba | 51 | (1) |
| Total | | 130 | (8) |

International career
| 2013 | Serbia U16 | 4 | (0) |
| 2013 | Serbia U17 | 1 | (0) |
| 2014–2016 | Serbia U18 | 7 | (0) |
| 2015–2016 | Serbia U19 | 4 | (0) |
- * Club domestic league appearances and goals

Dragiša "Dragi" Gudelj (Serbian Cyrillic: Драгиша Гудељ; born 8 November 1997) is a Serbian retired footballer. Mainly a centre-back, he also played as a left-back.

Gudelj also holds Dutch citizenship.

== Career ==
Born in Breda, Gudelj began his career with hometown side NAC Breda, but never played as a senior for the club. On 6 May 2015, it was announced that he signed his first professional contract with Jong Ajax, moving to the club with his older brother Nemanja who signed a contract with Ajax's first team while their father Nebojša became a scout for the club.

In July 2017, after failing to feature for Ajax, Gudelj moved to Swiss side FC Wohlen. He joined Vitória de Guimarães in the following year, but only played for their B-team.

On 31 August 2020, Gudelj signed a two-year deal with Cádiz CF, being assigned to the reserves in Segunda División B. On 12 January 2022, he moved to fellow Segunda División RFEF side Córdoba CF on a short-term contract.

On 25 March 2023, while playing a league match against Racing de Ferrol, Gudelj collapsed in the 11th minute. Urgent medical assistance arrived, and cardiopulmonary resuscitation and was performed. It is said that two defibrillations were needed in order to stabilize the player. After 10 minutes, Gudelj had to be put in an ambulance and taken to Hospital Universitario Reina Sofía, in Córdoba. The match was suspended with both teams level at 1–1. Soon after the collapse, it was confirmed by the club that Gudelj had suffered a cardiac arrest, and that he was in stable condition and undergoing tests in an intensive care unit.

Gudelj was fitted with an implantable cardioverter-defibrillator on 30 March 2023, and subsequently returned to play. On 9 July, he renewed his link with Córdoba until 2025.

Gudelj collapsed again on 3 December 2023, in the first half of a match against UD Melilla; he went down in the 28th minute, before getting up shortly after and looking to the opposite side of the ball. He was later replaced, and the match ended 2–0 for Córdoba. On 16 January 2024, his club confirmed that he would remain sidelined under a medical release for the remainder of the season.

On 24 July 2024, Córdoba announced Gudelj's retirement at the age of 26, due to his health issues.

== Personal life ==
Gudelj is the son of former player Nebojša Gudelj. His older brother Nemanja is also a footballer.
