= Alfred Ajdarević =

Swedish professional footballer (born 1998)

Personal information
- Date of birth: 20 June 1998 (age 28)
- Place of birth: Sweden
- Height: 1.88 m (6 ft 2 in)
- Position: Midfielder

Team information
- Current team: Tvååkers IF
- Number: 9

Youth career
- Rinia IF
- –2016: Falkenbergs FF
- 2016: Örebro

Senior career*
Years	Team	Apps	(Gls)
2016–2021	Örebro	5	(0)
2019	→ IFK Värnamo (loan)	18	(1)
2020	→ IK Frej (loan)	20	(6)
2022–2023	Örebro Syrianska IF	52	(18)
2024	Vllaznia	10	(0)
2024	Örebro Syrianska IF	15	(3)
2025	FC Rosengård 1917	29	(4)
2026–	Tvååkers IF	29	(9)
- * Club domestic league appearances and goals as of 16 November 2026

Alfred Ajdarević (born 20 June 1998) is a Swedish professional footballer who plays as a midfielder for Tvååkers IF.

== Early life ==
Alfred was born in Sweden, with origin from Medveđa, Serbia. Later, his family moved to Sweden in 1992. Albanian sources claim that the family real surname was Hajdari but since his father played in Yugoslav league they switched it to "Ajdarević". His father Agim Ajdarević was a member of FK Spartak Subotica in the Yugoslav First League in the 1980s and 1990s, and later when Agim moved to Sweden in 1992, he signed with Falkenbergs FF. His elder brother Astrit was also part of Falkenbergs FF such as their father and also started youth career at Rinia IF. His other elder brother, Arben is also a footballer.

== Club career ==
=== Early career ===
Ajdarević started his youth career at Rinia IF from where he moved at Falkenbergs FF. Then on 5 July 2016 he signed with Örebro SK joining his elder brother Astrit Ajdarević.

=== Örebro ===
He was included in the first team of Örebro SK for the match against his former team Falkenberg on 23 July 2016 where he was an unused substitute for the entire match. He made his professional debut on 6 November 2016 against Elfsborg coming on as a substitute in the 76th minute in place of Maic Sema.

On 28 January 2019, Ajdarević was loaned out to IFK Värnamo for the whole 2019 season.

On 30 June 2021, Ajdarević left Örebro.

On 22 July 2024, Ajdarević returned to Örebro Syrianska IF.

On 10 January 2025, Ajdarević signed for FC Rosengård 1917.

== International career ==
Ajdarević received his first international call-up at Albania national under-21 football team by coach Alban Bushi for a gathering in Durrës, Albania from 18 to 25 January 2017. In 2019, he was called up to the Kosovo national under-21 football team, but remained on the bench.

== Career statistics ==
=== Club ===
As of 29 November 2020

Club statistics
Club	Season	League			Cup		Other		Total	
Club	Season	Division	Apps	Goals	Apps	Goals	Apps	Goals	Apps	Goals
Örebro	2016	Allsvenskan	1	0	1	0	—		2	0
Örebro	2017	Allsvenskan	2	0	1	0	—		3	0
Örebro	2018	Allsvenskan	2	0	1	0	—		3	0
IFK Värnamo (loan)	2019	Division 1	18	1	0	0	—		18	1
IK Frej (loan)	2020	Division 1	20	6	0	0	—		20	6
IK Frej (loan)	Total		43	7	3	0	—		46	7
Career total			43	7	3	0	—		46	7
