= Nadvoda =

Settlement in Zadar County, Croatia

- Settlement
- Interactive map of Nadvoda
- Location of Nadvoda in Croatia
- Coordinates: 44°09′58″N 15°50′38″E
- Country: Croatia
- County: Zadar County
- City: Obrovac

Area
  - Total: 16.3 km^{2} (6.3 sq mi)

Population (2021)
  - Total: 135
  - Density: 8.28/km^{2} (21.5/sq mi)
- Time zone: UTC+1 (CET)
  - Summer (DST): UTC+2 (CEST)
- Postal code: 23450 Obrovac
- Area code: +385 (0)23

Nadvoda is a settlement in the City of Obrovac in Croatia. In 2021, its population was 135.

== Demographics ==
Nadvoda: Population trends 1857–2021
v

population			375	347	424	475			579	633	634	602	614	750	50	170	135
	1857	1869	1880	1890	1900	1910	1921	1931	1948	1953	1961	1971	1981	1991	2001	2011	2021

Sources: Croatian Bureau of Statistics publications
