= Mladen Rudonja =

Slovenian footballer

Personal information
- Date of birth: 26 July 1971 (age 55)
- Place of birth: Koper, SR Slovenia, Yugoslavia
- Height: 1.75 m (5 ft 9 in)
- Position: Winger

Youth career
- 1978–1990: Koper

Senior career*
Years	Team	Apps	(Gls)
1990–1992	Koper		
1992–1993	Izola	46	(16)
1994	Zagreb	6	(0)
1994	Koper	15	(3)
1995	Olimpija	26	(2)
1996	Marsonia	14	(1)
1996–1997	Gorica	16	(4)
1997	Primorje	9	(4)
1998–2000	Sint-Truiden	74	(21)
2000–2002	Portsmouth	13	(0)
2002–2004	Olimpija	48	(5)
2004–2005	Apollon Limassol	11	(2)
2005	Anorthosis Famagusta	3	(0)
2005–2007	Koper	14	(1)
2007–2009	Olimpija Ljubljana	34	(19)
2012	Koper	0	(0)
2014	SV Oberdrauburg	1	(0)

International career
1994–2003	Slovenia	65	(1)
2003	Slovenia B	2	(0)
- * Club domestic league appearances and goals

Mladen Rudonja (born 26 July 1971) is a Slovenian retired footballer. He most often played as a winger (usually on the left side) or striker.

== International career ==
Rudonja made his debut for the Slovenia national team in a February 1994 friendly match against Georgia. Despite being an attacker, he did not score a goal for the team until his 53rd cap – in the second leg of the 2002 FIFA World Cup qualifying playoffs against Romania in Bucharest. The match ended with a score of 1–1, a result that was enough to secure Slovenia's first-ever qualification for the main World Cup event. Rudonja played 65 matches for Slovenia.

== Personal life ==
His son Roy is a former professional footballer.
