= Elmir Asani =

Serbian footballer

Personal information
- Full name: Elmir Halil Asani
- Date of birth: 15 September 1995 (age 31)
- Place of birth: Novi Sad, FR Yugoslavia
- Height: 1.70 m (5 ft 7 in)
- Position: Left wing

Team information
- Current team: Tekstilac Odžaci

Youth career
- 2011–2014: Vojvodina

Senior career*
Years	Team	Apps	(Gls)
2014–2015	Vojvodina	14	(1)
2014	→ Sloga Temerin (loan)	12	(4)
2015–2017	Voždovac	25	(1)
2017–2018	Zemun	23	(0)
2018–2019	Mauerwerk	8	(3)
2019	Skënderbeu Korçë	2	(0)
2019–2020	OFK Bačka	20	(3)
2020–2021	Mladost Novi Sad		
2021–	Tekstilac Odžaci		
- * Club domestic league appearances and goals as of 23 November 2019

Elmir Halil Asani (Serbian Cyrillic: Елмир Халил Асани; born 15 September 1995) is a Serbian footballer who plays as a left-wing for Tekstilac Odžaci.

== Early life ==
Asani was born in Novi Sad, FR Yugoslavia is the son of player of Borac Novi Sad, Halil Asani.

== Club career ==
=== Vojvodina ===
In 2011, Asani signed scholarship contract with Vojvodina. He, along other players from Vojvodina youth team took part in the competition "The Chance", which is used for searching talents. On 17 April 2014, Asani made his Serbian SuperLiga debut for the first team in a 1–2 away win against Sloboda Užice after coming on as a substitute.

=== Tekstilac Odžaci ===
On 27 June 2021, he joined Serbian League Vojvodina club Tekstilac Odžaci.
