= Halil Asani =

Serbian footballer

Personal information
- Full name: Halil Asani
- Date of birth: 27 March 1974 (age 52)
- Place of birth: Dragash, SR Serbia, SFR Yugoslavia
- Height: 1.74 m (5 ft 9 in)
- Position: Left-back

Senior career*
Years	Team	Apps	(Gls)
199x–199x	Novi Sad		
199x–2000	ČSK Čelarevo		
2001	Vojvodina	8	(1)
2002–2007	ČSK Čelarevo	145	(6)
2007–2012	Proleter Novi Sad	113	(0)
2013–2014	ŽSK Žabalj		
2014–201x	Borac Novi Sad		
Total		266	(7)
- * Club domestic league appearances and goals

Halil Asani (Serbian Cyrillic: Халил Асани; born 27 March 1974) is a Serbian former professional footballer who played as a defender.

== Career ==
After playing for ČSK Čelarevo in the Second League of FR Yugoslavia, Asani was transferred to First League side Vojvodina in the 2001 winter transfer window. He made four appearances and scored one goal in the second half of the 2000–01 season. In the first half of the 2001–02 season, Asani appeared in four more games for Vojvodina, before returning to ČSK Čelarevo in the 2002 winter transfer window.

Between early 2002 and late 2012, Asani played for two clubs, ČSK Čelarevo and Proleter Novi Sad, spending five and a half seasons with each side.

== Personal life ==
Asani is of Gorani descent. He is the father of fellow footballer Elmir Asani.

== Honours ==
ČSK Čelarevo

- Serbian League Vojvodina: 1997–98

Proleter Novi Sad

- Serbian League Vojvodina: 2008–09
