= Krupa, Croatia =

Settlement in Zadar County, Croatia

Krupa
- Settlement
- Interactive map of Krupa
- Location of Krupa in Croatia
- Coordinates: 44°11′46″N 15°54′20″E
- Country: Croatia
- County: Zadar County
- City: Obrovac

Area
  - Total: 54.1 km^{2} (20.9 sq mi)

Population (2021)
  - Total: 83
  - Density: 1.5/km^{2} (4.0/sq mi)
- Time zone: UTC+1 (CET)
  - Summer (DST): UTC+2 (CEST)
- Postal code: 23450 Obrovac

Krupa is a settlement in the City of Obrovac in Croatia. In 2021, its population was 83.

== Demographics ==
Krupa: Population trends 1857–2021
v

population	508	569	564	580	749	860	883	879	948	893	839	656	484	412	57	127	83
	1857	1869	1880	1890	1900	1910	1921	1931	1948	1953	1961	1971	1981	1991	2001	2011	2021

Sources: Croatian Bureau of Statistics publications
