= Milan Pršo =

Serbian footballer

Personal information
- Full name: Milan Pršo
- Date of birth: 29 June 1990 (age 36)
- Place of birth: Knin, SR Croatia, Yugoslavia
- Height: 1.84 m (6 ft 1/2 in)
- Position: Midfielder

Youth career
- Crvena zvezda

Senior career*
| Years | Team | Apps | (Gls) |
| 2008–2013 | Rad | 60 | (4) |
| 2014 | Bežanija | 14 | (0) |
| 2017–2019 | FK Srbija Uzwil | | |
| 2019– | Zuce 2019 | | |

International career
| 2006–2007 | Serbia U17 | 5 | (3) |
| 2009 | Serbia U19 | 2 | (0) |
- * Club domestic league appearances and goals as of 26 August 2014

Milan Pršo (Serbian Cyrillic: Милан Пршо; born 29 June 1990) is a Serbian footballer who played as a midfielder.

== Career ==
Pršo played in youth categories of FK Crvena zvezda but he never played for their senior side. In 2008, he started his senior career with FK Rad. In the winter of 2014 he moved to the Serbian First League club Bežanija, and stayed with them for the rest of the season. He had two seasons in the Swiss Amateur leagues.

== Personal life ==
Pršo is a Croatian Serb by ethnicity, born in Knin, raised in Obrovac, at the time part of SR Croatia, Yugoslavia (now Croatia). After Operation Storm (4–7 August 1995), when his family fled Obrovac, they arrived in Belgrade, the capital of Serbia. His paternal uncle is former Croatian footballer Dado Pršo. He has declined call-ups to the Croatia national team, stating that he "only will perform for Serbia".
