= Gornji Karin =

Settlement in Zadar County, Croatia

- Settlement
- Interactive map of Gornji Karin
- Location of Gornji Karin in Croatia
- Coordinates: 44°08′06″N 15°37′55″E
- Country: Croatia
- County: Zadar County
- City: Obrovac

Area
  - Total: 42.7 km^{2} (16.5 sq mi)

Population (2021)
  - Total: 824
  - Density: 19.3/km^{2} (50.0/sq mi)
- Time zone: UTC+1 (CET)
  - Summer (DST): UTC+2 (CEST)
- Postal code: 23450 Obrovac
- Area code: +385 (0)23

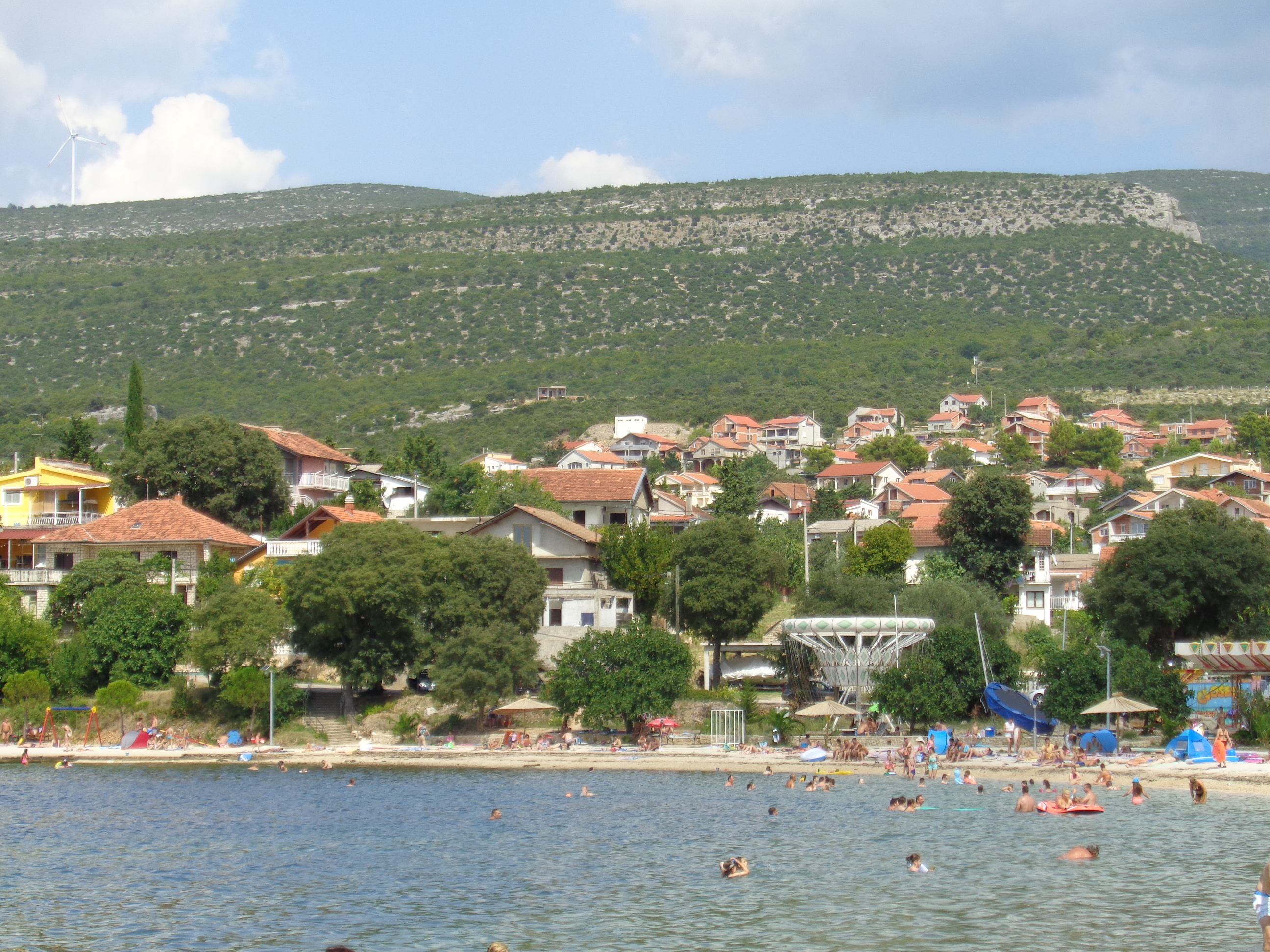
Gornji Karin village at Karin Sea, Zadar County, Croatia

Gornji Karin is a settlement in the City of Obrovac in Croatia. In 2021, its population was 824.

== Demographics ==
Gornji Karin: Population trends 1857–2021
v

population	1040	1146	1234	1235	1415	1655	1541	1637	1001	1123	1175	1089	949	876	859	1125	824
	1857	1869	1880	1890	1900	1910	1921	1931	1948	1953	1961	1971	1981	1991	2001	2011	2021

Sources: Croatian Bureau of Statistics publications
