= Zrmanja =

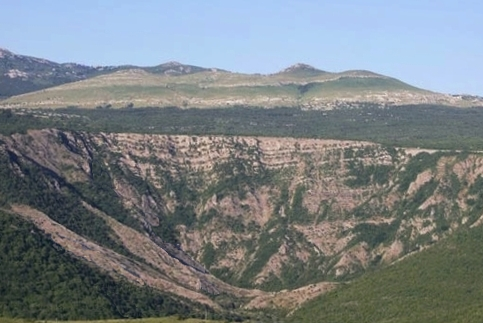
- Misije, a source of Zrmanja River

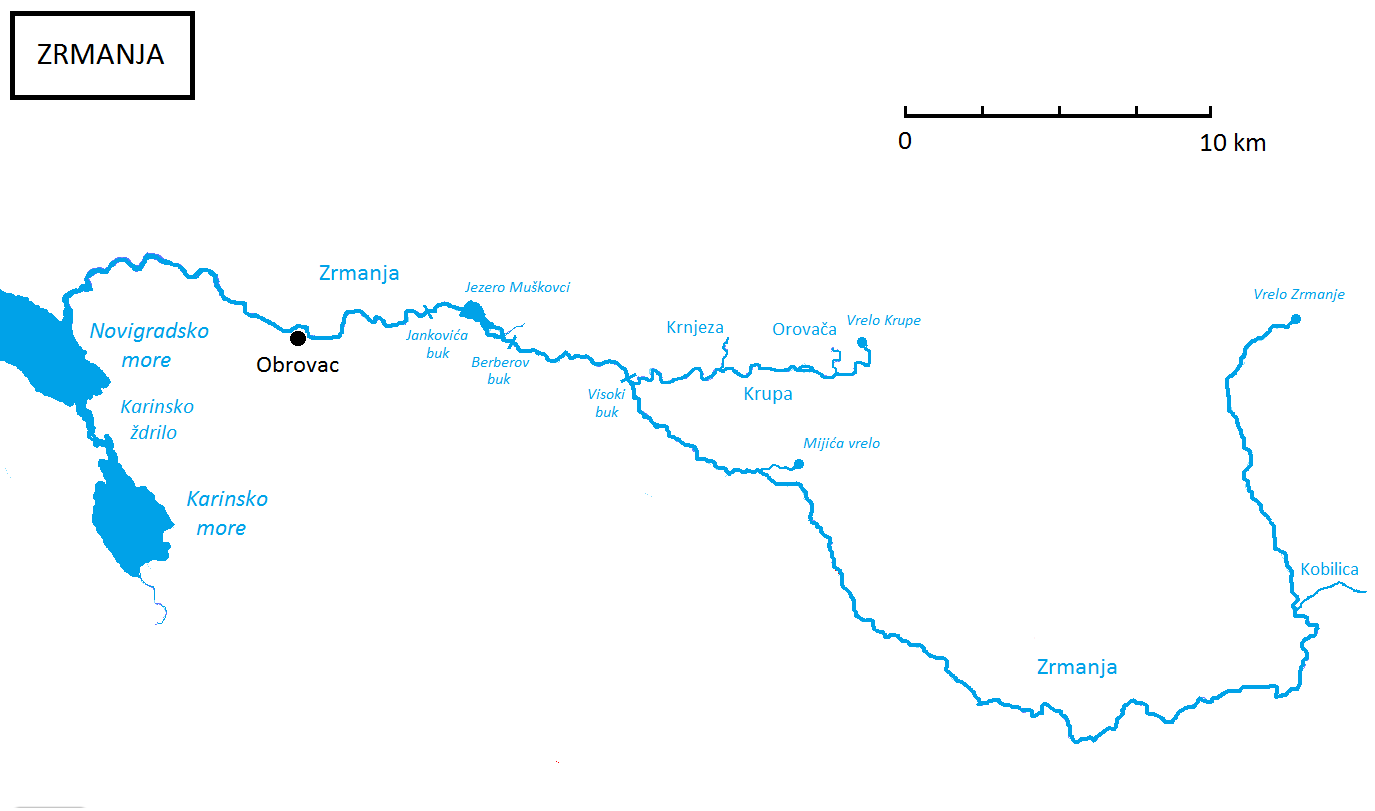
- Map of the river basin

Location
- Country: Croatia

Physical characteristics
- Mouth
  - location: Adriatic Sea
  - coordinates: 44.2017°N 15.5883°E
- Length: 69 km (43 mi)
- Basin size: 907 km^{2} (350 sq mi)

Zrmanja (pronounced [zř̩maɲa], Italian: Zermagna) is a river in southern Lika and northern Dalmatia, Croatia. It is 69 km (43 mi) long and its basin covers an area of 907 km^{2} (350 mi^{2}).

It was known to the ancient Romans as Tedanius. The spring of Zrmanja is located in southern part of Lika under Postak - the southern peak of Pljesevica mountain, and close to south end of Velebit mountain. It is characteristic for its spring located on the bottom of very steep, almost 200 m high funnel shape rock called Misije. It flows southward through the narrow and long arable valley which encircles the southern end of Velebit through a 200-metre-deep canyon, and then turns westwards, reaches Obrovac, and after a few kilometers flows into the Adriatic Sea in the bay named Novigradsko more. Its main tributary is right bank Krupa river, rich in tufa and travertine rock sediments forming around its numerous waterfalls.

In the 1990s the Velebit area was declared a nature park. Rafting trips on Zrmanja take place in spring and autumn, while kayaks and canoes are used during low water level period of July and August.

The river was hit by an ecological disaster in December 2019 when waste from a former alumina plant was washed into the karst underground. Alkaline mud has been kept in open pools since the closure of the plant.

== Gallery ==
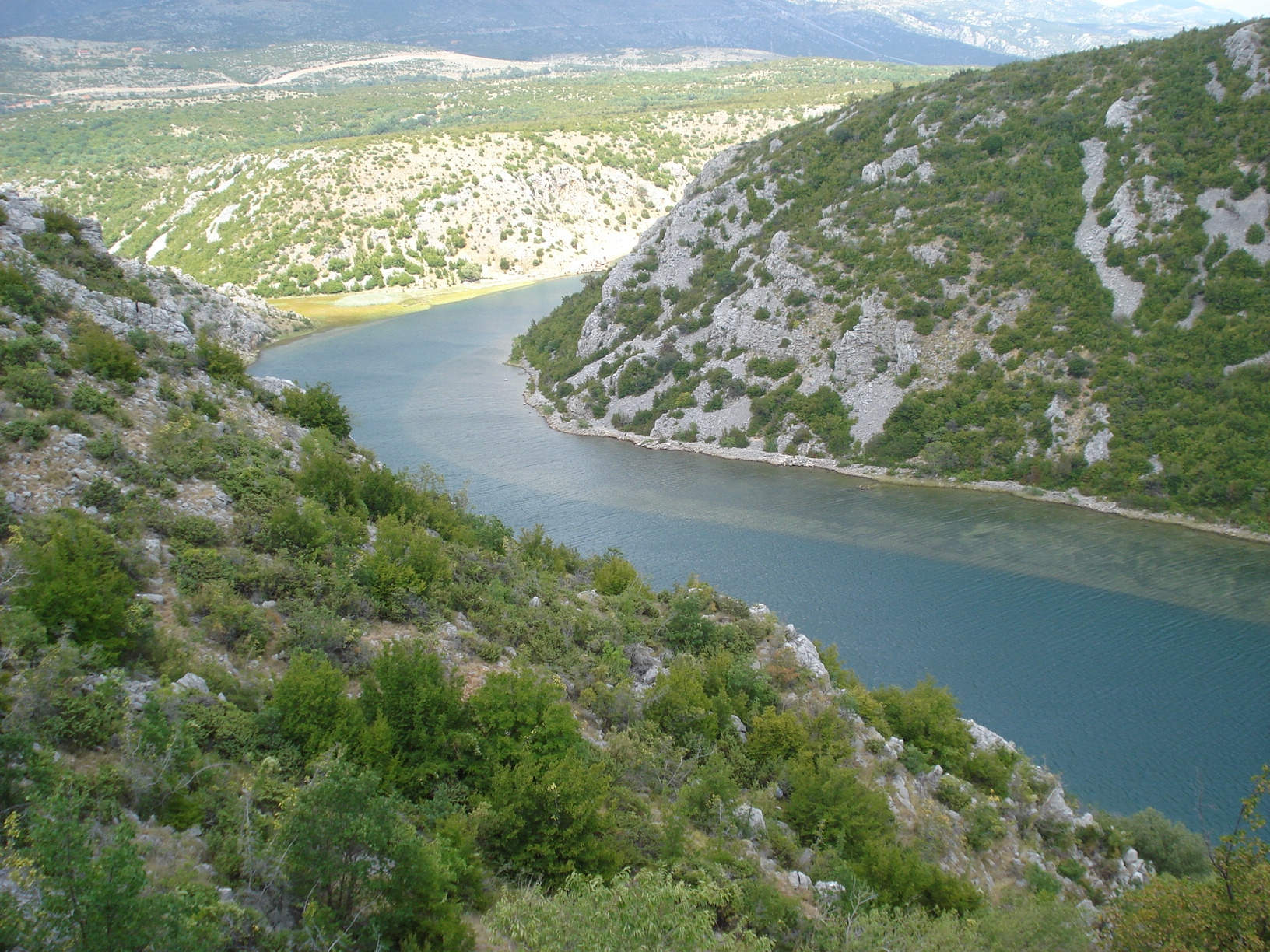
The river near Obrovac

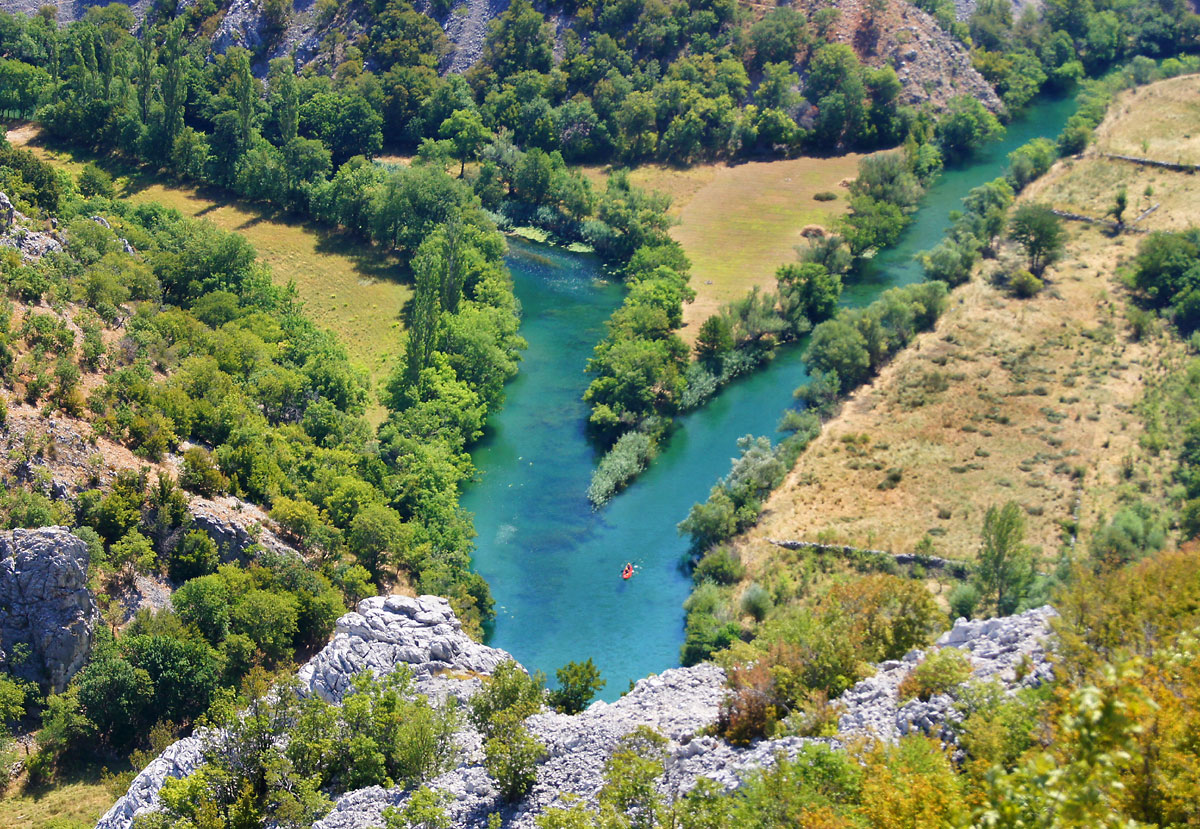
Krupa flows into Zrmanja from the left side on the photo.
