= 1991 Yugoslav campaign in Croatia =

Conflict between SFR Yugoslavia and Croatia

Coordinates: 45.29°N 18.98°E

- Part of the Croatian War of Independence
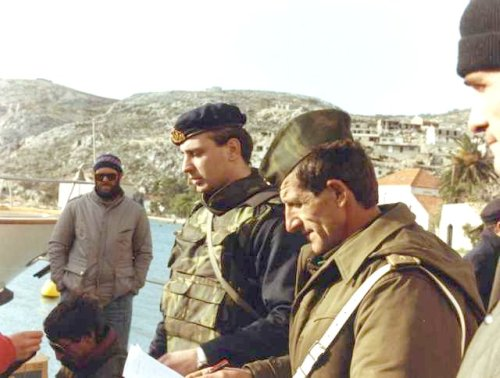
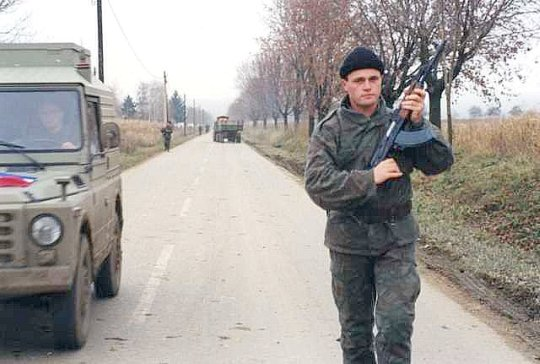
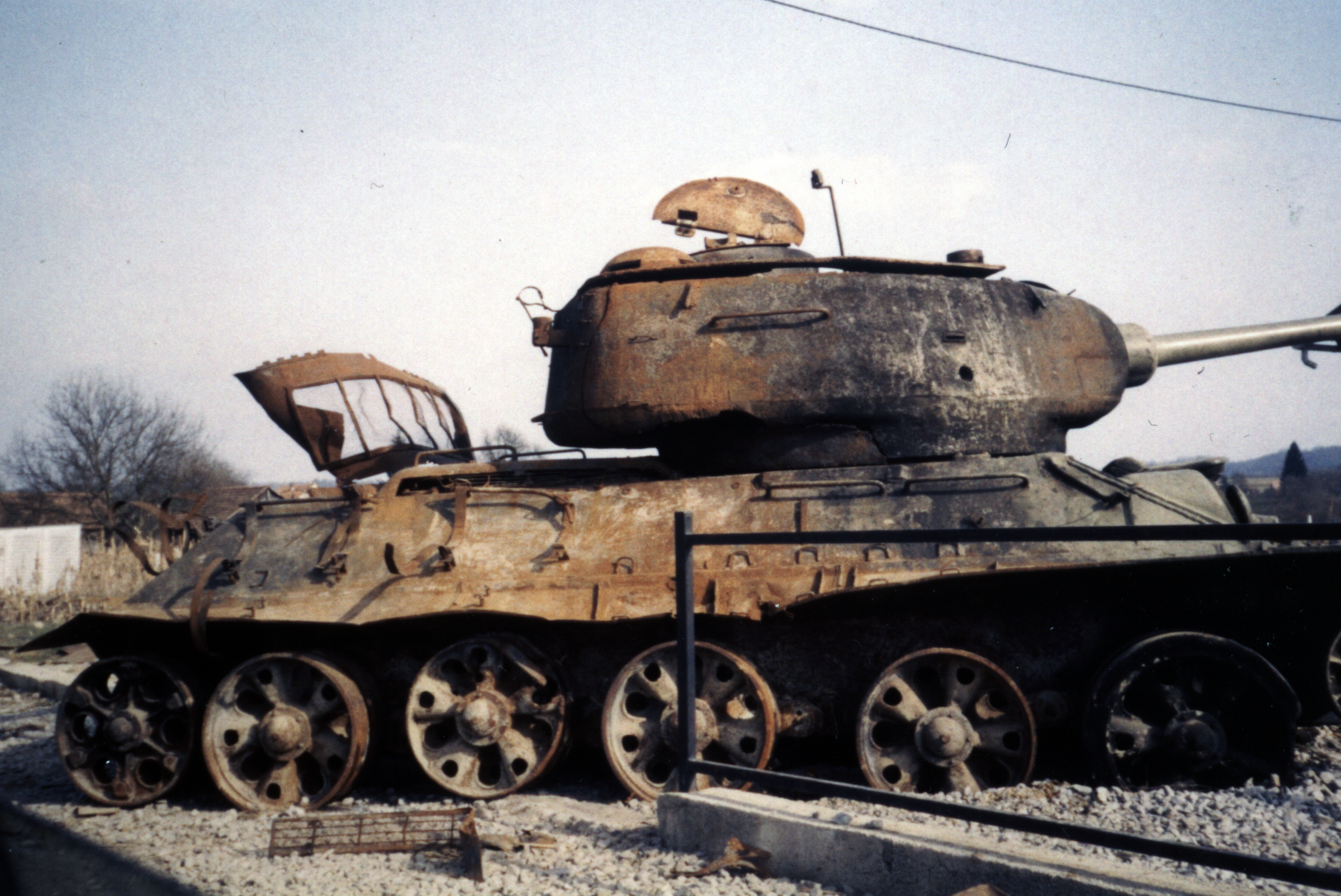
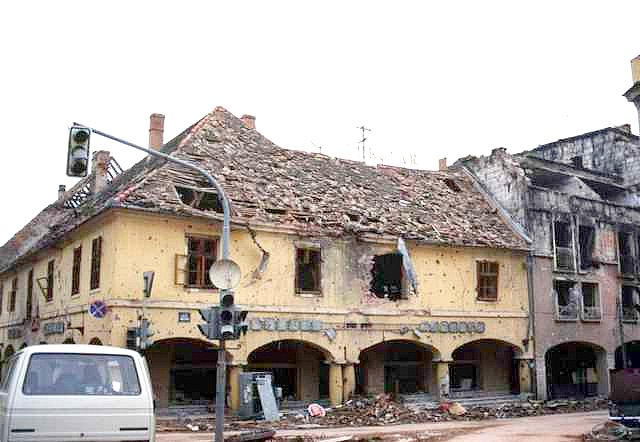
- (clockwise from top left): Yugoslav People's Army officers inspecting documents during the Siege of Dubrovnik; a Croatian Serb guerrilla marching near Erdut; bombardment damage on buildings in Vukovar; a destroyed Yugoslav People's Army T-34 tank near Karlovac
Date	20 September 1991 – 3 January 1992
Location	Croatia
Result	Yugoslav People's Army victory
Territorial changes	Croatia lost control of one-third of its territory: Republic of Serbian Krajina formed as a self-proclaimed Serb proto-state from Croatia; Establishment of Dubrovnik Republic

Belligerents
SFR Yugoslavia; SAO Krajina; SAO Eastern Slavonia, Baranja and Western Syrmia; SAO Western Slavonia; Dubrovnik Republic	Croatia

Commanders and leaders
(Socialist Federal Republic of Yugoslavia) Veljko Kadijević (Socialist Federal Republic of Yugoslavia) Blagoje Adžić; Slobodan Milošević (Socialist Republic of Montenegro) Momir Bulatović (Socialist Republic of Montenegro) Milo Đukanović (Socialist Republic of Montenegro) Pavle Bulatović; Milan Martić; Željko Ražnatović	(Croatia) Franjo Tuđman (Croatia) Gojko Šušak (Croatia) Martin Špegelj (Croatia) Anton Tus (Croatia) Milivoj Petković (Croatia) Ante Paradžik X

Units involved
Yugoslav People's Army; Yugoslav Ground Forces; Yugoslav Navy; Yugoslav Air Force; Territorial Defense; Serbian Territorial Defense; Montenegrin Territorial Defense; Serbian paramilitary units	Armed Forces of Croatia; Croatian National Guard; Croatian Army; Croatian Navy; Croatian Air Force; Croatian Police; Croatian Defence Forces

Strength
September 1991; 145,000 troops 1,100 tanks 700 APCs; 1,980 artillery pieces	September 1991; 58,000 troops January 1992; 155,772 troops 216 tanks 127 APCs; 1,108 artillery pieces

Casualties and losses
1,279 killed	3,761 killed
- Civilian casualties: See the Aftermath section

The 1991 Yugoslav campaign in Croatia was an armed conflict between the Yugoslav People's Army (JNA), the Yugoslav Navy and the Yugoslav Air Force, and the Croatian National Guard (ZNG) then the Croatian Army (HV) during the Croatian War of Independence. The JNA was originally deployed in order to preserve Yugoslavia, and the initial plan of the campaign entailed the military occupation of Croatia and the removal of the Croatian leadership elected in 1990. The JNA intervention was the culmination of its involvement in the confiscation of weapons from Croatia's Territorial Defence, and in the Croatian Serb revolt that had begun in August 1990. From that time, the JNA had been frequently deployed to form a buffer zone between the Croatian Serb guerrillas and the ZNG or the Croatian police. In effect, these JNA buffer zones often secured the territorial gains of the insurgents and led to an increasingly hostile relationship between the JNA and Croatia. The JNA campaign plan was amended shortly before the campaign to include the relief of JNA barracks besieged by the ZNG. The besieging and subsequent capture of several JNA facilities allowed Croatia to arm its previously poorly equipped military and to equip and recruit new ethnic Croat conscripts and officers of the Yugoslav People's Army.

The campaign effectively started on 20 September 1991, even though relatively minor offensive actions had already been undertaken. By the end of the month, it suffered from serious delays and manpower shortages caused by low call-up turnout in Serbia. In early October, the original campaign objectives were reduced as Serbian president Slobodan Milošević and his allies gained greater control of the JNA. Subsequently, the campaign objectives were redefined to deny the Croatian Government access to parts of Croatia that contained substantial Serb populations and to protect Croatian Serbs. The campaign culminated in late November and early December with the Battle of Vukovar and the Siege of Dubrovnik. A limited Croatian counterattack and the development of the Croatian Army led to a stalemate on the battlefield.

The strategic situation permitted the development of the Vance plan—a ceasefire supervised by United Nations peacekeepers designed to create conditions for the political settlement of the conflict in Croatia. The Sarajevo Agreement, regarding the implementation of the ceasefire, was signed on 2 January 1992, bringing the campaign to an end. Nonetheless, the JNA took several more months to withdraw from Croatia as it was replaced by the UN peacekeepers. In 1991 alone, the conflict caused more than 7,000 deaths and the internal displacement of 400,000–600,000 people. More than 1,700 persons remain missing as a result of the campaign.

== Background ==
In 1990, following the electoral defeat of the government of the Socialist Republic of Croatia, ethnic tensions increased. The Yugoslav People's Army (Jugoslovenska Narodna Armija – JNA) confiscated the weapons of Croatia's Territorial Defence (Teritorijalna obrana – TO) to minimize potential resistance. On 17 August, the tensions escalated into an open revolt by Croatian Serbs, centred on the predominantly Serb-populated areas of the Dalmatian hinterland around Knin, parts of the Lika, Kordun, Banovina regions and eastern Croatia. In January 1991, Serbia, supported by Montenegro and Serbia's provinces of Vojvodina and Kosovo, made two unsuccessful attempts to obtain approval from the Yugoslav Presidency to deploy the JNA to disarm Croatian security forces. After a bloodless skirmish between Serb Krajina Militia and Croatian special police in March, the JNA, supported by Serbia and its allies, asked the federal Presidency to grant it wartime powers and declare a state of emergency. The request was denied on 15 March, and by the summer of 1991, the JNA came under the control of the Serbian President Slobodan Milošević as the Yugoslav federation started to fall apart.

Milošević became de facto commander of the JNA once he secured control over the vacant federal presidency and through his influence over the federal defence minister General Veljko Kadijević and JNA chief of staff Blagoje Adžić. Milošević, preferring a campaign aimed at expanding Serbia rather than preserving Yugoslavia, publicly threatened to replace the JNA with a Serbian army and declared that he no longer recognized the authority of the federal presidency. This threat caused the JNA to gradually abandon plans to preserve Yugoslavia in favour of the expansion of Serbia. By the end of the month, the conflict had escalated and the first fatalities occurred. The JNA then stepped in to support the guerrillas and prevent Croatian police from intervening. In early April, leaders of the Serb revolt in Croatia declared their intention to integrate the area under their control with Serbia. The Government of Croatia considered this an act of secession.

At the beginning of 1991, Croatia had no regular army. In an effort to bolster its defence, it doubled police numbers to about 20,000. The most effective part of the force was the 3,000-strong special police deployed in 12 battalions which adopted principles of military organization. In addition, there were 9,000–10,000 regionally-organized reserve police; these were set up in 16 battalions and 10 independent companies, but the units lacked weapons. In May, in response to the deteriorating situation, the Croatian government established the Croatian National Guard (Zbor narodne garde – ZNG) by amalgamating the special police battalions into four guards brigades. The guards brigades initially comprised about 8,000 troops, and were subordinated to the Ministry of Defence headed by retired JNA General Martin Špegelj. The regional police, by then expanded to 40,000, was also attached to the ZNG and re-organized into 19 brigades and 14 independent battalions. The guards brigades were the only ZNG units that were fully equipped with small arms, while heavier weapons and an effective command and control structure were lacking throughout the ZNG. At the time, Croatian weapon stocks consisted of 30,000 small arms purchased abroad in addition to 15,000 previously owned by the police. A new 10,000-strong special police was established to replace the personnel transferred to the ZNG guards brigades.

The Croatian view of the JNA role in the Serb revolt gradually evolved between January and September 1991. The initial plan of Croatian President Franjo Tuđman was to win support for Croatia from the European Community (EC) and the United States, and he dismissed advice to seize JNA barracks and storage facilities in the country. Tuđman's stance was motivated by his belief that Croatia could not win a war against the JNA. The ZNG was limited to a defensive role even though the actions of the JNA appeared to be coordinated with Croatian Serb forces. This impression was reinforced by buffer zones the JNA established after armed conflicts between the Croatian Serb guerrillas and the ZNG—the JNA intervened after the ZNG lost ground, leaving the Croatian Serbs in control of the territory. Furthermore, the JNA provided some weapons to the Croatian Serbs, although the bulk of the weaponry was provided from Serbia's TO and Ministry of Internal Affairs stocks. After the start of the JNA intervention in Slovenia in late June, conscripts began deserting from the JNA and very few were drafted to replace them, except in Serbia.

== Prelude ==
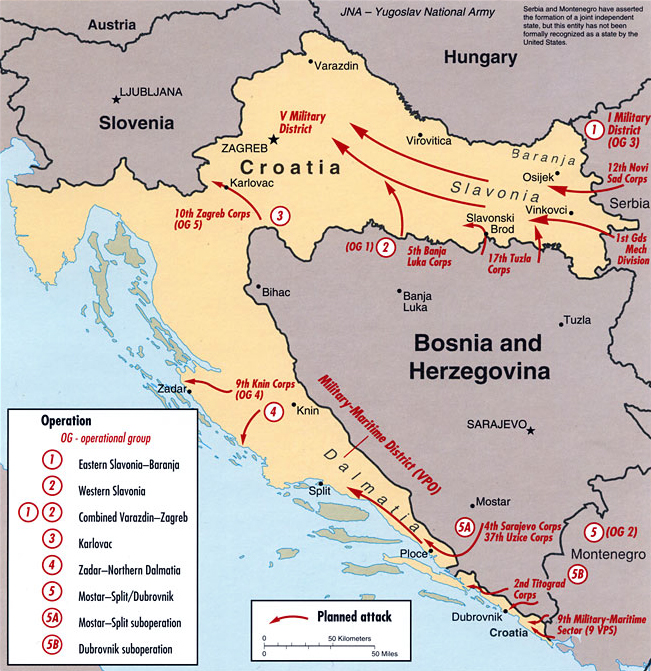
Map showing the JNA plan for its 1991 campaign in Croatia

The JNA intervened directly against Croatia in early July in Baranja, north of the city of Osijek. On 1 August, they drove Croatian forces out of Erdut, Aljmaš and Dalj, and out of Baranja around 22 August. During the summer of 1991, the Croatian Serb military consolidated in the territory under its control. In Banovina, Glina was captured from the ZNG on 26 July. That same day, two Croatian police stations near Hrvatska Kostajnica were captured, isolating the town. The attacks, codenamed Operation Stinger, were carried out by the 7th Banija Division, spearheaded by the Knin special police led by Dragan Vasiljković. In the aftermath of capture of the Kozibrod police station, Serb forces committed the first mass killing, involving the deaths of ten captured policemen and seventeen civilians.

The ZNG successfully defended Hrvatska Kostajnica until mid-September. In August, Croatian Serbs acting under the operational control of the JNA clashed with the ZNG around Osijek, Vukovar and Vinkovci in eastern Slavonia. Fighting in eastern Slavonia led to ZNG blockades of JNA barracks in those cities and limited fighting against the garrisons there. In western Slavonia, the Croatian Serb militia attempted to advance into Daruvar but were held back by the ZNG in the area around Okučani and south of Pakrac before the JNA formed a buffer zone there. Following this fighting, Croatia was denied use of major transport routes between Zagreb and Slavonia. In northern Dalmatia, the JNA initiated several clashes with the ZNG and coordinated its advances with Croatian Serb forces. These attacks culminated in the capture of Kijevo on 26 August and the Maslenica Bridge on 11 September. The capture of the bridge severed the last remaining road link between Dalmatia and the rest of Croatia. In the summer of 1991, the performance of the ZNG was poor because it lacked manpower and weapons, and exerted inadequate command and control. The professional ZNG troops were better trained than their opponents, with the exception of the Knin special police set up by the Serbian State Security Service.

On 1 September 1991, Tuđman accepted an EC-proposed ceasefire and peace conference, despite his ultimatum demanding that the JNA return to its barracks by 31 August. After the Yugoslav Presidency also accepted it, the conference began on 7 September. Four days later, the Croatian member and chair of the federal presidency, Stjepan Mesić, ordered the JNA to return to its barracks within 48 hours. The move was motivated by Tuđman's impression that the conference would have continued endlessly while the ZNG lost ground. The order was disputed by other members of the presidency, but it gave Croatia justification to openly confront the JNA. On 14 September, the ZNG and the Croatian police blockaded and cut utilities to all JNA facilities it had access to, beginning the Battle of the Barracks. The ZNG blockaded 33 large JNA garrisons in Croatia, and numerous smaller facilities including border posts and weapons and ammunition storage depots. The ZNG quickly captured isolated facilities and depots, as well as several major JNA posts, and seized large quantities of weapons—including the capture of entire stocks of the JNA 32nd (Varaždin) Corps and nearly all the weapons confiscated from Croatia's TO. The JNA lost control of eight brigades—including one armoured and two mechanized brigades, and three artillery regiments—while additional forces in the JNA Fifth Military District and its Military-Maritime District remained besieged. The significance of the Battle of the Barracks was reinforced by the introduction of a United Nations (UN) arms embargo on 25 September. In September, Anton Tus was appointed the Chief of the General Staff of the Armed Forces of the Republic of Croatia.

== Order of battle ==
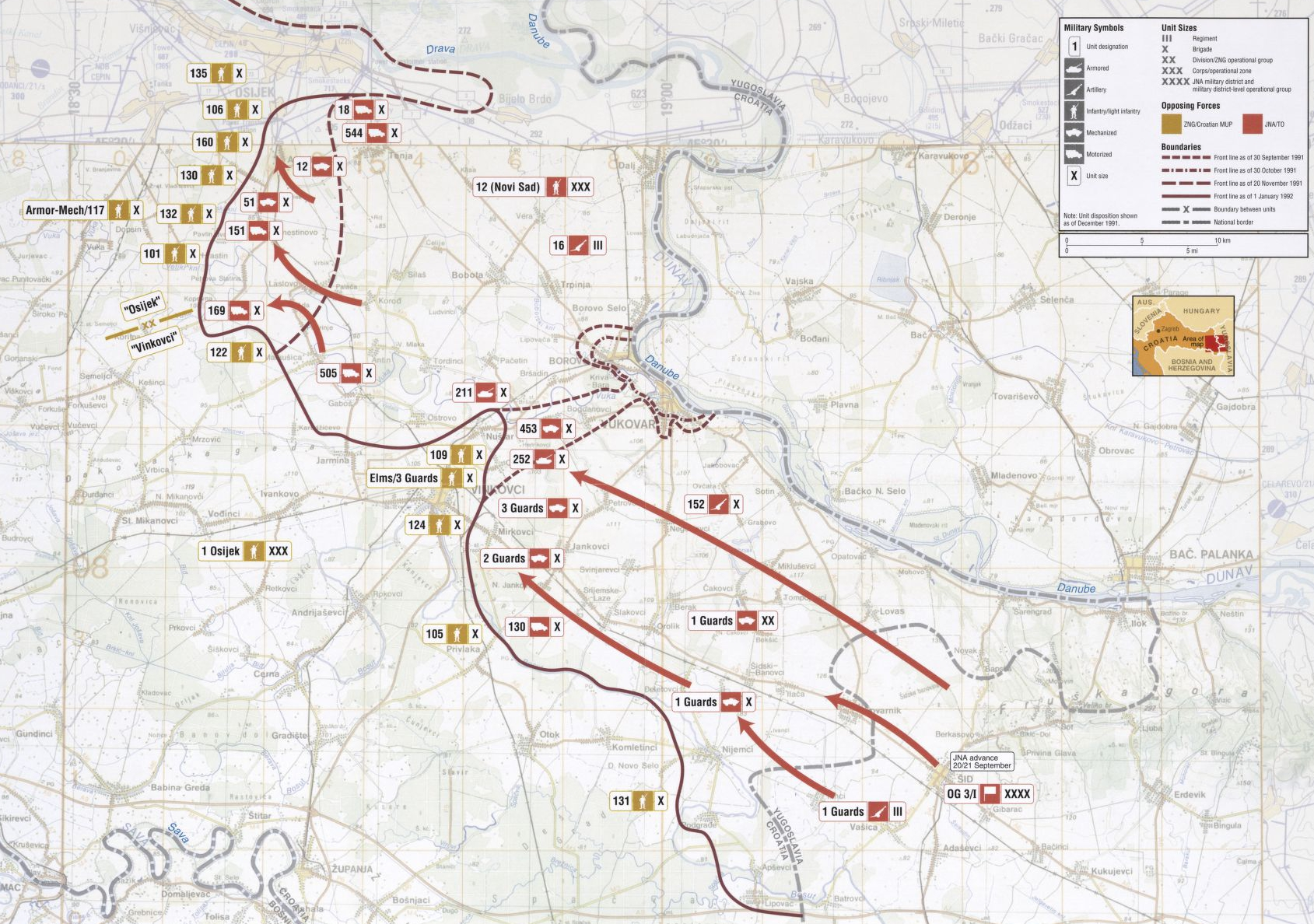
Map showing the fighting in eastern Slavonia, September 1991 – January 1992

In early September 1991, the ZNG had 8,000 full-time and 40,000 reserve troops. The four guards brigades of full-time troops were the only units of the ZNG that were fully equipped with small arms, but even they lacked heavy weapons. A 10,000-strong special police force was established to replace the personnel transferred from the original special police units to the guards brigades. In September, the Croatian small arms stockpile consisted of 30,000 purchased abroad in addition to 15,000 previously owned by the police. The Battle of the Barracks resulted in a large increase to ZNG weapon holdings—allowing full arming of its existing units, raising of an additional 40–42 brigades and fielding a total of 200,000 troops and 40,000 police by the end of the year. The ZNG captured 250 tanks, 400–500 heavy artillery pieces, 180,000 small arms and 2,000,000 long tons (2,200,000 short tons) of ammunition. In addition, 3,000 officers, mostly Croatian by nationality, changed allegiance and left the JNA to join the ZNG. In 1991, the ZNG was supported by the Croatian Defence Forces (Croatian: Hrvatske obrambene snage, HOS)—a militia raised by the Croatian Party of Rights. The party stated it had as many as 3,000 troops, but the police estimated it at 250 armed militiamen.

The JNA planned a two-stage mobilisation of troops. The first wave of call-ups was performed in July, and was meant to intimidate Croatia without an actual offensive being launched and allow timely deployment of crucial units. After the first stage of the mobilisation failed to deter Croatian forces, the second stage commenced on 15 September; it was met with a large-scale refusal of mobilised personnel to report to their designated units, desertions and an overall lack of enthusiasm for the campaign. This resulted in low troop availability, forcing the JNA to deploy fewer infantry units and to abandon some operations. Response to the mobilisation was particularly poor in Central Serbia, where only 26% of those called-up reported for service. Nonetheless, in September 1991, the JNA discharged conscripts that had completed their terms of service, and reached 73% of planned troop levels. The mobilisation problems demoralised JNA troops and commanders. A request made by JNA general command to Milošević for general mobilisation to strengthen troop levels was denied because he did not believe the campaign was needed nor feasible. Despite the mobilisation problems, the JNA and the TO forces deployed in support of the campaign consisted of approximately 145,000 troops, 1,100 tanks, 700 other armoured vehicles and 1,980 artillery pieces, supported by the Yugoslav Air Force and the Navy.

== Timeline ==
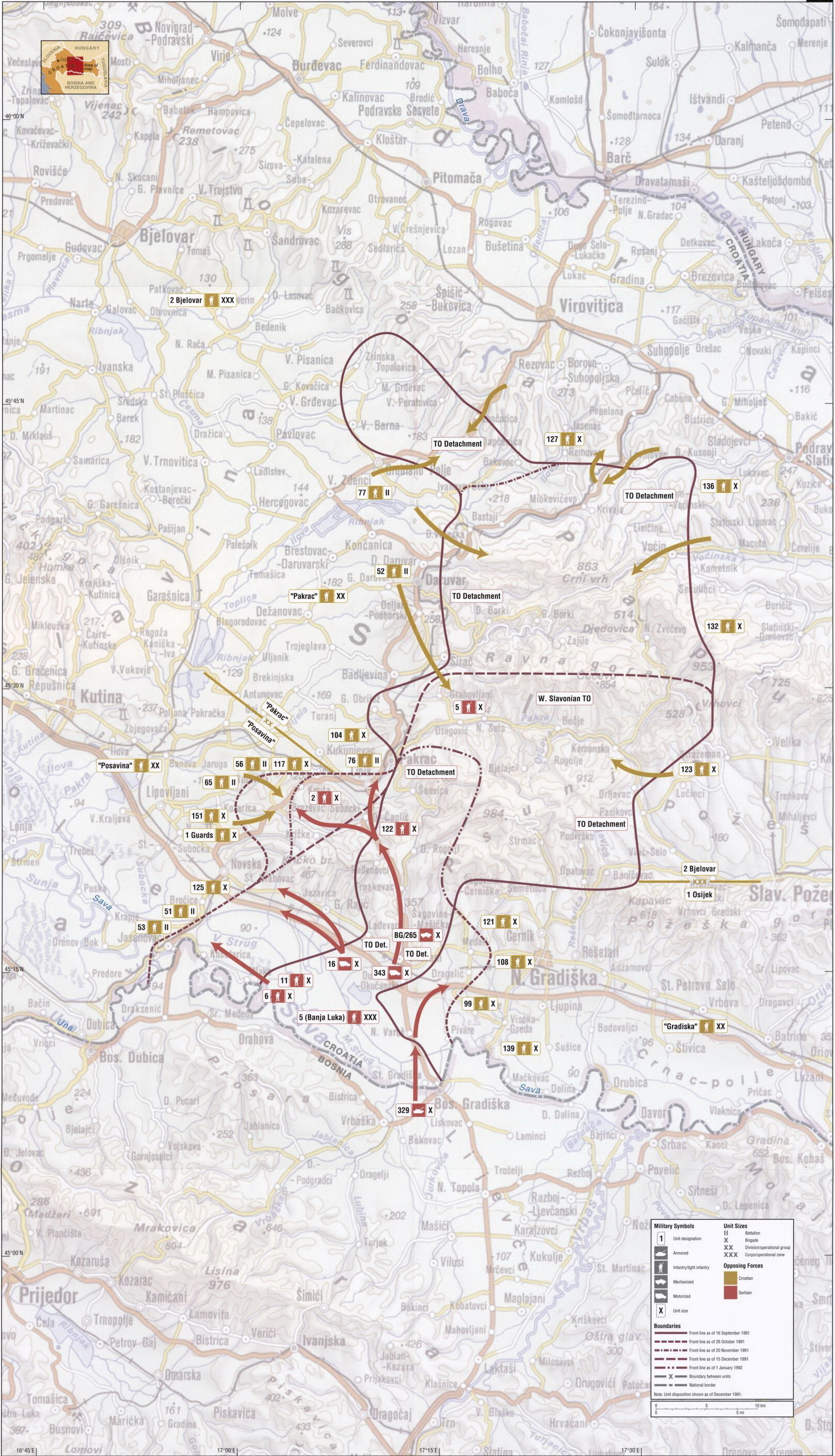
Map showing the fighting in western Slavonia, September 1991 – January 1992

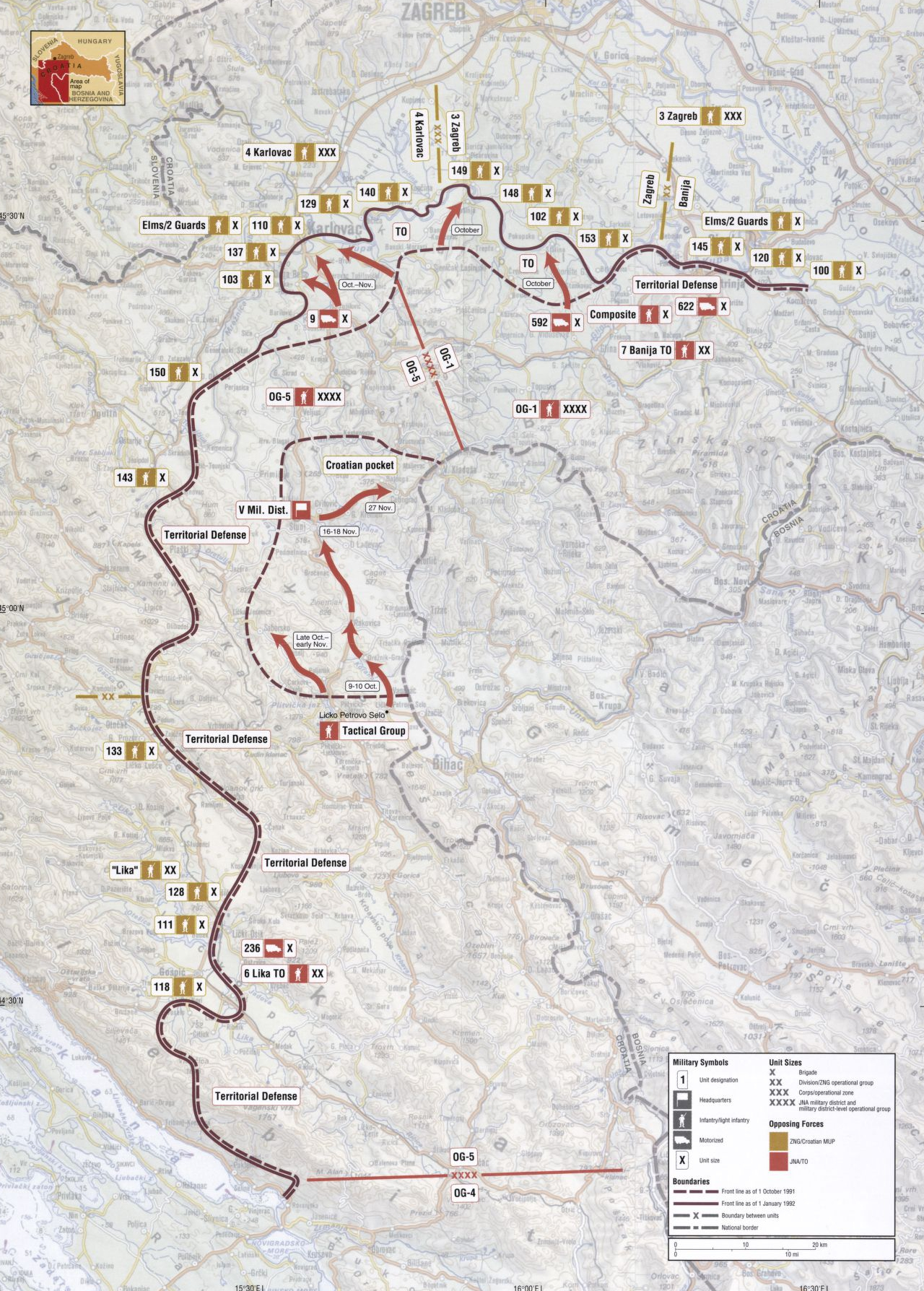
Map showing the fighting in the Banovina, Kordun and Lika regions, October 1991 – January 1992

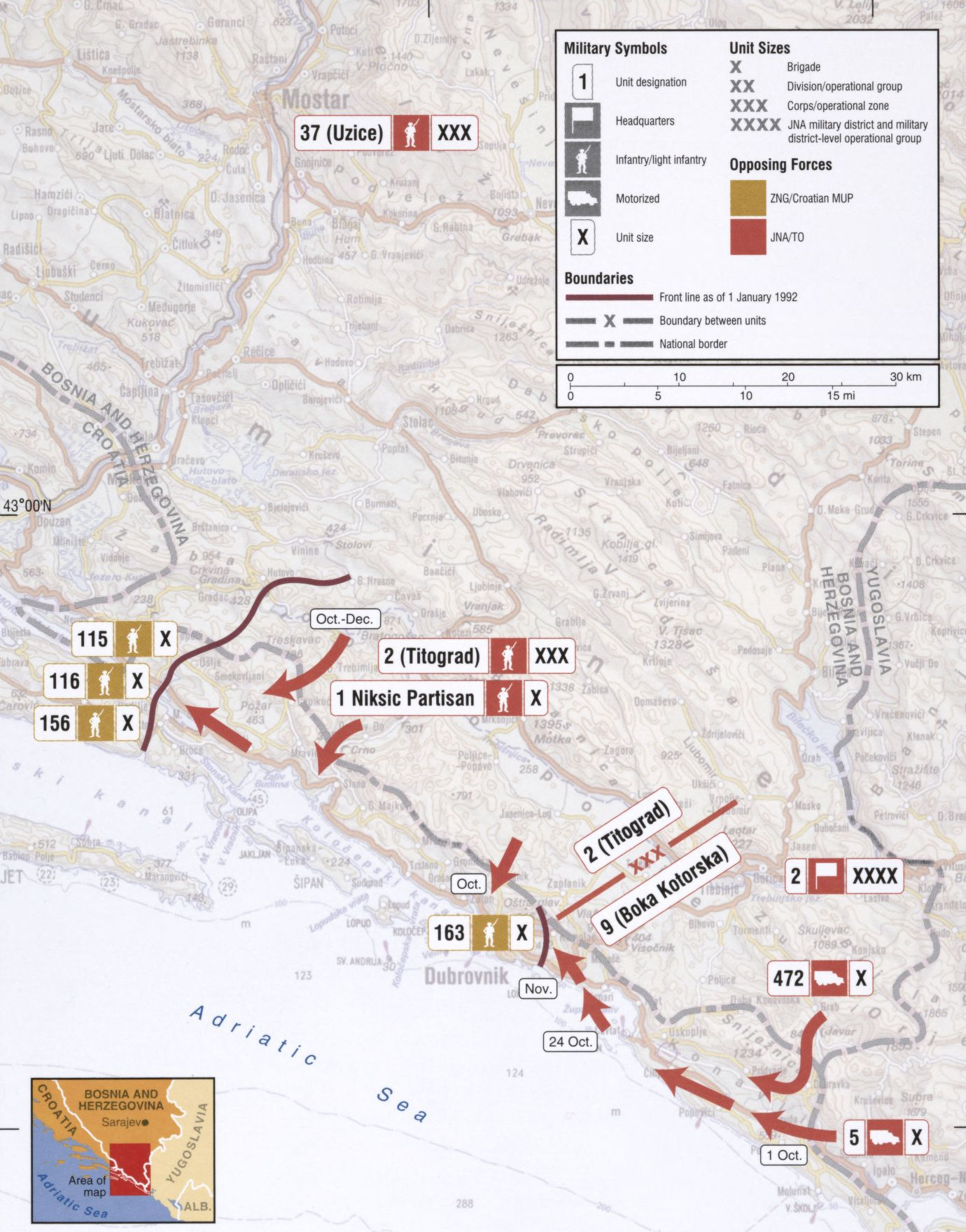
Map showing the fighting in the Dubrovnik area, October 1991 – January 1992

The JNA developed a plan to defeat Croatia militarily, overthrow its government and create conditions necessary for the continued existence of Yugoslavia. The plan was amended in September 1991 to accommodate the besieging of JNA garrisons by the ZNG, incorporating the lifting of the blockade into the campaign objectives. The plan entailed five corps-level campaigns designed to impose an air and naval blockade of Croatia, capture territory populated by Serbs and relieve barracks under ZNG siege. The axes of attack were specified as Gradiška–Virovitica, Bihać–Karlovac–Zagreb, Knin–Zadar and Mostar–Split. Armoured and mechanized forces were tasked with the capture of eastern Slavonia and advances west towards Zagreb and Varaždin. This was identified as the main effort of the campaign. Finally, a land blockade of Dubrovnik was planned, coupled with an advance west towards the Neretva River to support the drive to Split. The plan may have proposed withdrawal of the JNA to Serb-populated areas of Croatia or from the whole of Croatia after the objectives were completed, but sources conflict on that issue.

=== September offensive ===
In eastern Slavonia, the JNA responded to the ZNG siege of its garrison in Vukovar, and on 14 September 1991 it deployed troops to relieve the barracks. Independent of that effort, the main thrust of the campaign against Croatia was initially planned to start on 21 September. The southern operational group of the thrust, spearheaded by the 1st Guards Mechanised Division, was expected to lift the ZNG siege of the JNA barracks in Vinkovci, and reach Našice and Slavonski Brod in two to three days. Over the next four to five days, the group was expected to reach the line Okučani–Suhopolje by advancing via the Đakovo–Požega road and the Zagreb–Belgrade motorway, avoiding major population centres. The northern operational group, subordinated to the 12th (Novi Sad) Corps, was to advance from Osijek to Našice and then further west towards Bjelovar. The two operational groups were assigned approximately 57,000 troops and 5,000 supporting personnel. The 17th (Tuzla) Corps was probably tasked with crossing the Sava River—marking the border of Croatia—at Slavonski Brod and Slavonski Šamac to join the westward drive along the motorway, but the crossing never occurred.

The campaign was brought forward by one day to 20 September. The change of schedule caused the JNA 1st Guards Mechanised Division to commit to battle as it arrived in eastern Slavonia with no reconnaissance or preparation. The resulting traffic jam on the Šid–Tovarnik–Stari Jankovci road prevented bridging units from reaching the Bosut River. That in turn prevented the 1st Guards Division from crossing the river and confined it to the area between the Bosut and the Danube, east of Vinkovci. Besides the bridging units, the division did not receive the 80th Motorised Brigade—which appears to have disintegrated before reaching the Croatian frontier—and the 2nd Guards Mechanised Brigade—a victim of friendly fire bombardment in the area between Tovarnik and Ilača adjacent to the border. Several units of the Novi Sad Corps also disintegrated when morale declined after a number of friendly fire incidents.

The Banja Luka Corps was tasked with the main axis of advance from Okučani to Daruvar and Virovitica in western Slavonia, and a secondary drive from Okučani towards Kutina. This task was consistent with the line expected to be reached by the main thrust of the JNA advancing from the east in about a week. The Corps had already deployed a battlegroup of the 265th Mechanised Brigade near Okučani to support the advance that started on 21 September, and reached the Papuk Mountains. The Corps received two motorised brigades and one artillery brigade as reinforcements during the advance, but the problems with morale and desertions experienced in eastern Slavonia were also present in the Banja Luka Corps. In one such instance, the 130th Mechanised Brigade, sent as a reinforcement, had been reduced to a 280-strong battalion by 29 September. The JNA was stopped by the ZNG between Novska, Nova Gradiška and Pakrac, even though some Croatian Serb militia units took positions on the Bilogora and Papuk north of Pakrac near Virovitica, and Slatina, with no JNA support.

The JNA Knin Corps, which had already fully mobilised and deployed, started the campaign in northern Dalmatia and southern Lika on 16 September 1991. It captured Drniš on 18 September, but sustained defeats at Pakovo Selo two days later and near Šibenik on 22 September as it attempted to capture the city. After this defeat, the Corps ceased its attacks, except for those around Gospić in Lika, for the rest of the month. Five days after the JNA and the Serbian Guard paramilitaries lost their positions in the city on 22 September, the Knin Corps captured Lovinac. JNA troops assembling near the southern tip of Croatia in the Dubrovnik hinterland consisted of elements of the Užice and Titograd Corps. They had not advanced onto Croatian soil by the end of September because of mobilisation problems in Bosnia and Herzegovina. In Banovina, the JNA captured Petrinja on 21 September, but failed to make further progress. Because of the failure of JNA mobilisation, the planned campaign in Kordun was limited to the consolidation of positions held around Karlovac. On 15 September, the Yugoslav Navy blockaded the Croatian Adriatic ports of Pula, Rijeka, Zadar, Split and Dubrovnik for a week.

=== Reduced objectives ===
On 30 September, the general staff of the JNA reduced the objectives of the campaign because it had not followed the initial plan and had become bogged down. The reduced objectives called for offensive and defensive actions, the inflicting of decisive defeats on Croatian forces in Dalmatia and eastern Slavonia, and strikes against vital infrastructure in Croatia, to obtain an agreement on the evacuation of besieged JNA facilities. While some units on the ground started to implement the new orders the same day, they did not take effect completely before 4 October. On 3 October, Serbian and Montenegrin representatives in the Yugoslav Presidency declared that they alone had become the acting federal presidency and assumed control of the JNA. Two days later, the JNA requested that the presidency authorize a general mobilization of forces needed for the campaign, but this was refused by Milošević. By 9 October, the JNA effort was considered a failure. Its commanders formally accepted the role forced on the JNA by Milošević and limited its strategic objectives in Croatia to the protection of Serb-populated areas.

The JNA effort to relieve its Vukovar barracks turned into a protracted siege, delaying 36,000 troops and a significant proportion of armoured units slated for the thrust towards Zagreb and Varaždin. Vukovar was captured in mid-November but the victory proved pyrrhic because it completely disrupted the overall campaign. During the Battle of Vukovar, the JNA formally approved the use of paramilitary volunteers to fill its ranks. These included the White Eagles and the Serb Volunteer Guard (SDG), which were trained by the Serbian Ministry of Interior. On 12 October, the federal presidency authorized the JNA to enlist the volunteers as an estimated 150,000 people had emigrated from Yugoslavia, while others had taken refuge with friends or relatives to avoid the JNA draft. After capturing Vukovar, the JNA 12th Corps and the SDG advanced south-west across the Bosut on 15–16 November, and west between Vinkovci and Osijek, on 20 November. However, the Croatian National Guard (ZNG)—officially renamed the Croatian Army (Hrvatska vojska – HV) that month—contained their advances. According to General Života Panić, commander of the JNA 1st Military District at the time, the immediate objectives of the advances were Osijek and Županja.

In Banovina, the JNA reached the Kupa River and captured its entire southern bank, except for ZNG bridgeheads in the areas of Nebojan, Sunja and Sisak, on 30 September. No further advances were achieved there. The JNA attempted an additional push towards the Nebojan bridgehead via Novi Farkašić on 17–18 October, and another towards Sunja on 2 November, but both attempts failed. On 4 October, the JNA initiated an attack in Kordun, in the area of Karlovac, pushing the ZNG back in the area of Slunj two days later. On 8 October, it reached the banks of the Kupa and Korana Rivers and the intensity of fighting died down. The greatest flare-up of hostilities in the area occurred on 4–5 November when a JNA garrison based in a suburb of Karlovac broke through the ZNG siege in the Battle of Logorište and reached JNA-held territory to the east of the city. Further south, the JNA captured Slunj on 17 November and Cetingrad on 29 November, eliminating a ZNG pocket in Kordun. JNA activity in Lika was limited to shelling and air raids on Gospić and Otočac, peaking on 4 October.

On 1 October, the JNA Banja Luka Corps initiated probing attacks in western Slavonia, presaging a major effort employing the bulk of the corps three days later. The advance established defensive positions just outside Novska and Nova Gradiška, and captured Jasenovac on 8 October. Lipik and a part of Pakrac were captured four days later. By that time, the JNA campaign in western Slavonia had lost its momentum.

In northern Dalmatia, the JNA Knin Corps attacked Zadar on 4 October, reaching its outskirts and lifting the ZNG siege of the Šepurine Barracks the next day. The advance was blocked by the ZNG and a truce was agreed on 7 October. Two days later, it was followed by an agreement to evacuate JNA facilities in Zadar, including equipment stored there. Further south, the JNA Titograd Corps and its Military-Maritime District forces advanced from eastern Herzegovina and the Bay of Kotor, and pushed east and west of Dubrovnik on 1 October, placing besieging the city by the end of the month. The JNA was supported by Montenegro's TO in the area. Even though the Croatian troops defending the city were few, the city held out, sustaining increasingly intensive artillery, naval and air bombardment until a ceasefire was agreed in the area on 7 December. As the siege shaped international opinion on the Croatian War of Independence, it became a major contributor to a shift towards the international diplomatic and economic isolation of Serbia and rump Yugoslavia, and resulted in the creation of a perception of Serbia and rump Yugoslavia as an aggressor state.

The JNA attacks on Dubrovnik and Zadar were supported by the Yugoslav Navy, which blockaded the coast on two more occasions. On 3 October, all shipping off Croatia, except for ferry lines to Pag and islands in the Kvarner Gulf, was halted. The blockade, except for that of Dubrovnik, was lifted on 11 October. The final blockade, restricting access to Rijeka, Zadar, Šibenik and Split in addition to Dubrovnik, started on 8 November. On 15 November, the Yugoslav Navy sustained losses when it unsuccessfully attacked Split and the island of Brač. The Yugoslav blockade in the northern Adriatic ended on 22 November, but in the southern Adriatic—except off Dubrovnik—it was lifted on 3 December.

=== Croatian counter-offensive ===
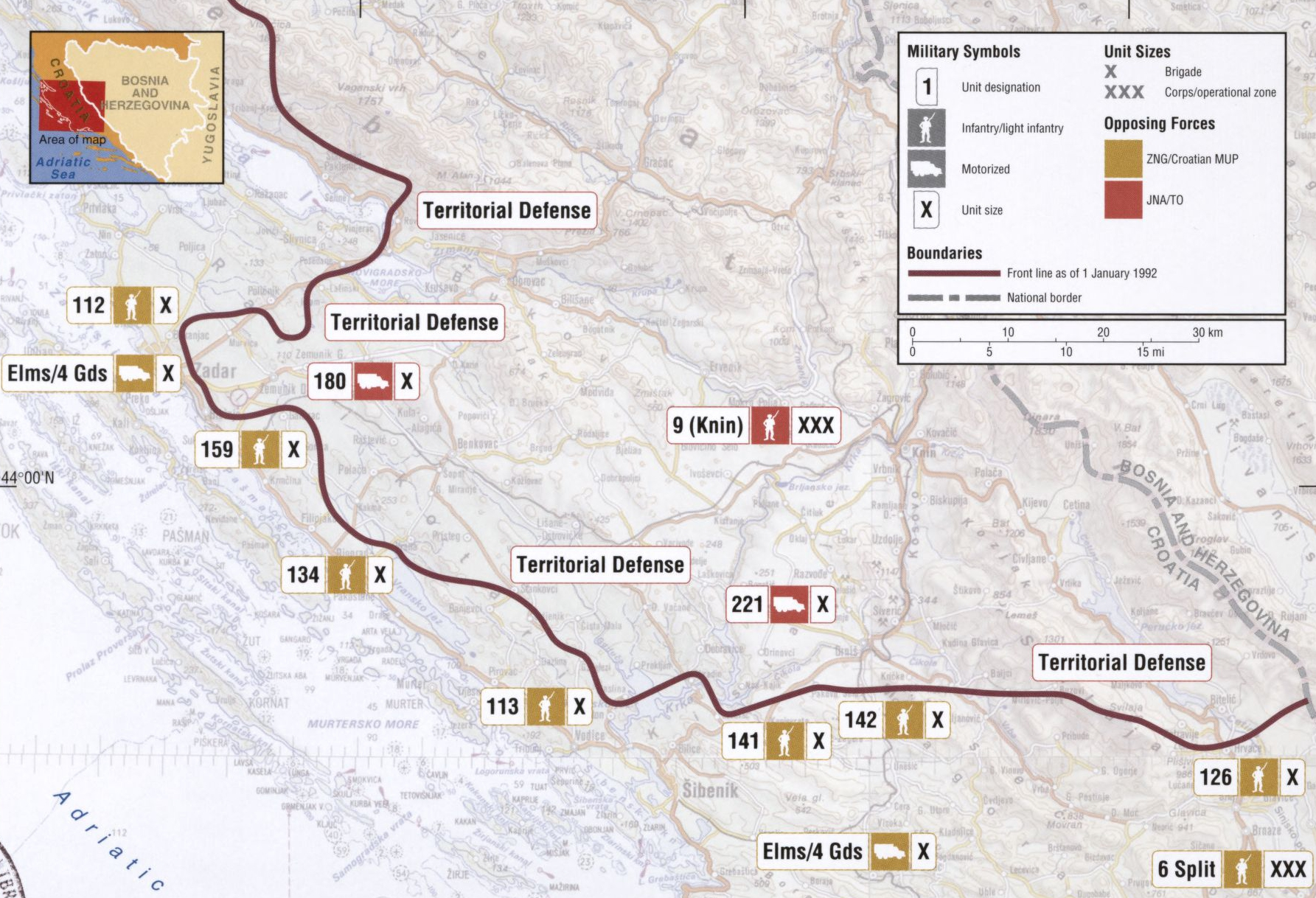
Map showing the situation in northern Dalmatia, January 1992

On 8 October, Croatia declared independence from Yugoslavia. Even though the declaration had been preceded the day before by a Yugoslav Air Force attack on the presidential office in Zagreb, the Croatian authorities considered that the war situation was no longer critical. This assessment was followed by an order to prepare plans for a counter-offensive on 12 October, and three more orders to commence offensive operations, which were issued by 20 November. The plans involved containing the JNA south of Osijek, advancing to the Bosut River south of Vinkovci, recapturing Jasenovac and the Okučani–Lipik road to secure the Papuk and Psunj mountains, advancing towards Petrinja, Glina, Slunj, Korenica and Gračac, recapturing the Maslenica Bridge and the Obrovac–Gračac road, and stopping the JNA advance north-west of Dubrovnik.

The most significant results were produced in western Slavonia, where Croatian forces began pushing the JNA away from Grubišno Polje towards Lipik on 31 October, and away from Nova Gradiška towards Okučani on 12 November. In mid-November, another push along the Novska–Okučani axis recaptured several villages by 9 December, while Lipik was recaptured by the Croatian forces—now renamed the HV—on 7 December. The mountains of Papuk and Bilogora, north of Pakrac where the Croatian Serb militia was not supported by the JNA, were brought under Croatian control in the same period. A HV offensive to recapture the Okučani area, codenamed Operation Orkan 91, commenced in the final days of December. The area was attacked from the directions of Pakrac, Novska and Nova Gradiška. The effort made no progress except west of Nova Gradiška—but even there it was very limited. Under international pressure, Tuđman called off the offensive on 26 December.

The second significant HV offensive was Operation Whirlwind, launched across the Kupa River on 11 December. The HV was tasked with advancing towards Glina but the operation failed after a shallow bridgehead was established within two days. In Lika, battles were fought for individual villages but little progress was made by either side. The JNA captured four villages south of Osijek between 21 November and 16 December but the front lines generally became static.

== Aftermath ==
Map showing JNA-held areas of Croatia in January 1992 (red)

The end to the campaign came in January 1992. Real progress toward ending the fighting came only after the Serbian political leaders concluded that their war aims of achieving military control over Serb areas in Croatia had been fulfilled. Between September and December 1991, the HV captured many weapons and significantly increased its capabilities. In mid-January 1992, it commanded 155,772 troops and had 216 tanks, 127 other armoured vehicles and 1,108 artillery pieces at its disposal. Even though JNA positions in western Slavonia were on the brink of military collapse, the HV struggled elsewhere and its munitions stockpiles were depleted, while the UN arms embargo prevented its quick resupply. By the end of 1991, the conflict had killed 6,000 Croatians. Another 23,000 were wounded and 400,000 became internally displaced persons (IDPs). Some sources report that there were as many as 600,000 IDPs. The 6,000 killed include 3,761 soldiers. JNA losses were officially reported at 1,279 killed in action, but the figure may have been considerably higher because casualties were consistently under-reported during the war. The HV counter-offensive in western Slavonia created 20,000 Serb refugees. They fled from the area when the JNA ordered the Croatian Serb forces to withdraw, and were subsequently settled in JNA-held Baranja.

In 1991 and early 1992, approximately 18,000 Croatian citizens were missing or held by the JNA or its allies. Approximately 8,000 of these were imprisoned in internment camps in Serbia, Montenegro, Bosnia and Herzegovina, or in Croatian territory controlled by the JNA. The camps were set up in Begejci, Stajićevo, Sremska Mitrovica, Niš, Aleksinac, Manjača, Banja Luka, Knin, Bučje, Beli Manastir, Negoslavci, Vukovar and Morinj. Approximately 300 prisoners died while detained in the camps. Most of the prisoners had been released by August 1992. As of May 2013 1,703 were people still missing as a result of the 1991 campaign. Both sides committed numerous atrocities during the conflict. The most significant one committed by Croatian forces was the Gospić massacre. The atrocities committed by Serb forces were far greater in scale. The most significant ones were those committed in Kijevo, the killing of more than 200 prisoners of war in the aftermath of the Battle of Vukovar, and the bombardment of Dubrovnik. Those war crimes were subsequently prosecuted by the International Criminal Tribunal for the former Yugoslavia, which was set up in 1993 under the terms of UN Security Council Resolution 827.

The atrocities prompted Germany to grant Croatia diplomatic recognition in mid-November. It overcame opposition to the move from the United Kingdom, France and the United States by late December, and formally recognized Croatia on 23 December 1991. The German decision was followed by recognition from other EC member states on 15 January 1992. The Croatian Serbs in turn declared the establishment of the Republic of Serbian Krajina (RSK) on 21 December 1991 in JNA-held areas comprising approximately 30% of Croatian territory. The RSK was entirely dependent on Serbia economically and financially.

The battlefield stalemate allowed the implementation of the Vance plan—an outcome of the diplomatic mission to Yugoslavia by the Special Envoy of the Secretary-General of the United Nations Cyrus Vance, aided by United States diplomat Herbert Okun, and Under-Secretary-General of the United Nations for Special Political Affairs Marrack Goulding. It was aimed at producing a negotiated end to hostilities in Croatia. The plan proposed a ceasefire, the protection of civilians in specific areas designated as UN Protected Areas and deployment of UN peacekeepers in Croatia. The plan was endorsed by Milošević, Kadijević, and Tuđman, and the three signed the Geneva Accord to that effect in Geneva, Switzerland, on 23 November 1991. The accord provided for the end of the Croatian blockade of JNA barracks, the withdrawal of JNA personnel and equipment from Croatia, the implementation of a ceasefire and the facilitation of delivery of humanitarian aid. The parties to the accord also agreed to the deployment of a UN peacekeeping mission in Croatia. The mission was subsequently authorised through United Nations Security Council Resolution 721 of 27 November, following a formal request for the deployment of UN peacekeepers submitted by the Yugoslav government the previous day. The Implementation Agreement, ensuring the ceasefire required for the deployment of peacekeepers, was signed by Croatian Defence Minister Gojko Šušak and deputy commander of JNA 5th Military District General Andrija Rašeta in Sarajevo, Bosnia and Herzegovina, on 2 January. The ceasefire generally held after it took effect on 3 January at 6 pm, except in the Dubrovnik area, where the JNA remained in positions around the town and in Konavle until July 1992. The naval blockade of Dubrovnik was lifted on 26 May 1992. As a consequence of organizational problems and breaches of the ceasefire agreement, the deployment of UN peacekeepers did not start until 8 March. The historian Marko Attila Hoare believes that the Vance plan saved the Croatian Serb rebels from defeat.
