= Roksandić =

Roksandić (Serbian Cyrillic: Роксандић) is a Serbo-Croatian surname, derived from the Serbian name Roksanda, a variant of the name Roxana. In Croatia, it is found in the region of Banija, in places such as Glina and Petrinja. It may refer to:

- Simeon Roksandić, Serbian sculptor and academic
- Drago Roksandić, Croatian historian from Petrinja
- Slobodan Roksandić, Serbian actor in Greh njene majke
