= Mačkovo Selo =

- Village
- Location of Mačkovo Selo in Croatia
- Coordinates: 45°17′39″N 16°17′40″E
- Country: Croatia
- Region: Continental Croatia (Banovina)
- County: Sisak-Moslavina
- Municipality: Petrinja

Area
  - Total: 3.9 km^{2} (1.5 sq mi)

Population (2021)
  - Total: 18
  - Density: 4.6/km^{2} (12/sq mi)
- Time zone: UTC+1 (CET)
  - Summer (DST): UTC+2 (CEST)
- Postal code: 44204 Jabukovac
- Area code: (+385) 44

Mačkovo Selo is a village in central Croatia, in the Town of Petrinja, Sisak-Moslavina County. It is connected by the D30 highway.

== Demographics ==
According to the 2011 census, the village of Mačkovo Selo has 36 inhabitants. This represents 19.57% of its pre-war population according to the 1991 census.

Population change 1857-2011
v

population	325	403	394	309	309	619	574	636	265	272	278	237	194	184	23	36
	1857	1869	1880	1890	1900	1910	1921	1931	1948	1953	1961	1971	1981	1991	2001	2011

Sources: Croatian Bureau of Statistics publications

Note: Data for years 1910-1931 also includes data for the village of Miočinovići.
