= Slana, Croatia =

Slana
- Village
- Location within Croatia
- Coordinates: 45°27′N 16°08′E
- Country: Croatia
- Region: Continental Croatia (Banovina)
- County: Sisak-Moslavina
- Municipality: Petrinja

Area
  - Total: 9.4 km^{2} (3.6 sq mi)

Population (2021)
  - Total: 54
  - Density: 5.7/km^{2} (15/sq mi)
- Time zone: UTC+1 (CET)
  - Summer (DST): UTC+2 (CEST)

Slana is a village administratively located in the Town of Petrinja in Sisak-Moslavina County, Croatia.
