= Donja Bačuga =

- Village
- Location of Donja Bačuga in Croatia
- Coordinates: 45°21′27″N 16°15′05″E
- Country: Croatia
- Region: Continental Croatia (Banovina)
- County: Sisak-Moslavina
- Municipality: Petrinja

Area
  - Total: 8.5 km^{2} (3.3 sq mi)
  - Land: 10.11 km^{2} (3.90 sq mi)
- Elevation: 130 m (430 ft)

Population (2021)
  - Total: 78
  - Density: 7.7/km^{2} (20/sq mi)
- Time zone: UTC+1 (CET)
  - Summer (DST): UTC+2 (CEST)
- Postal code: 44204
- Area code: (+385) 44

Donja Bačuga is a village in central Croatia, in the Town of Petrinja, Sisak-Moslavina County. It is connected by the D30 highway.

== Demographics ==
According to the 2011 census, the village of Donja Bačuga had 142 inhabitants. This represents 25.68% of its pre-war population according to the 1991 census.

Population change 1857-2011
v

population	545	653	727	563	688	1374	661	1514	664	664	730	684	606	553	184	142
	1857	1869	1880	1890	1900	1910	1921	1931	1948	1953	1961	1971	1981	1991	2001	2011

Sources: Croatian Bureau of Statistics publications

== Notable people ==
Dušan Ćorković (1921-1980)) - antifascist, partisan, general and People's Hero of Yugoslavia
