= Jabukovac =

Jabukovac may refer to:

- Jabukovac, Negotin, a village in the municipality of Negotin, Serbia
- Jabukovac, the old name for Deligrad, a village in the municipality of Aleksinac, Serbia
- Jabukovac, Croatia, a village in the municipality of Petrinja, Croatia
