= Jošavica =

Jošavica may refer to:

- Jošavica, Croatia, Croatian village near Petrinja
- Jošavica, Bosnia and Herzegovina, Bosnian village near Vukosavlje
