= Donja Mlinoga =

- Village
- Location of Donja Mlinoga in Croatia
- Coordinates: 45°21′N 16°18′E
- Country: Croatia
- Region: Continental Croatia (Banovina)
- County: Sisak-Moslavina
- Municipality: Petrinja

Area
  - Total: 3.4 km^{2} (1.3 sq mi)

Population (2021)
  - Total: 84
  - Density: 25/km^{2} (64/sq mi)
- Time zone: UTC+1 (CET)
  - Summer (DST): UTC+2 (CEST)
- Postal code: Postal code
- Area code: 44204

Donja Mlinoga is a village in central Croatia, in the Town of Petrinja, Sisak-Moslavina County. It is connected by the D30 highway.

== Demographics ==
According to the 2011 census, the village of Donja Mlinoga had 96 inhabitants. This represents 40.00% of its pre-war population according to the 1991 census.

Population change 1857-2011
v

population				370	394				307	319	319	280	259	240	127	96
	1857	1869	1880	1890	1900	1910	1921	1931	1948	1953	1961	1971	1981	1991	2001	2011

Sources: Croatian Bureau of Statistics publications
