= Luščani =

- Village
- Location of Luščani in Croatia
- Coordinates: 45°21′N 16°13′E
- Country: Croatia
- Region: Continental Croatia (Banovina)
- County: Sisak-Moslavina
- Municipality: Petrinja

Area
  - Total: 4.7 sq mi (12.2 km^{2})

Population (2021)
  - Total: 87
  - Density: 18/sq mi (7.1/km^{2})
- Time zone: UTC+1 (CET)
  - Summer (DST): UTC+2 (CEST)
- Postal number: 44205
- Area code: (+385) 44

Luščani is a village in central Croatia, in the Town of Petrinja, Sisak-Moslavina County.

== Demographics ==
According to the 2011 census, the village of Luščani had 163 inhabitants. This represents 24.33% of its pre-war population according to the 1991 census.

Population change 1857-2011:
v

population	700	717	691	910	999	1175	1191	1350	869	986	1050	920	800	670	156	163
	1857	1869	1880	1890	1900	1910	1921	1931	1948	1953	1961	1971	1981	1991	2001	2011

Sources: Croatian Bureau of Statistics publications

== Notable people ==
- Đuro Bakrač (1915-1996) – Partisan general and People's Hero of Yugoslavia
