= Gornja Mlinoga =

- Village
- Location of Gornja Mlinoga in Croatia
- Coordinates: 45°20′N 16°20′E
- Country: Croatia
- Region: Continental Croatia (Banovina)
- County: Sisak-Moslavina
- Municipality: Petrinja

Area
  - Total: 4.3 km^{2} (1.7 sq mi)

Population (2021)
  - Total: 21
  - Density: 4.9/km^{2} (13/sq mi)
- Time zone: UTC+1 (CET)
  - Summer (DST): UTC+2 (CEST)
- Postal code: Postal code
- Area code: 44204

Gornja Mlinoga is a village in central Croatia, in the Town of Petrinja, Sisak-Moslavina County. It is connected by the D30 highway.

== Demographics ==
According to the 2011 census, the village of Gornja Mlinoga has 33 inhabitants. This represents 13.58% of its pre-war population according to the 1991 census.

Population change 1857-2011
v

population	504	682	688	458	473	966	947	950	368	388	428	371	295	243	45	33
	1857	1869	1880	1890	1900	1910	1921	1931	1948	1953	1961	1971	1981	1991	2001	2011

Sources: Croatian Bureau of Statistics publications
