= Glinska Poljana =

Coordinates: 45°25′N 16°09′E

- Village
- Interactive map of Glinska Poljana
- Country: Croatia
- Region: Continental Croatia (Banovina)
- County: Sisak-Moslavina
- Municipality: Petrinja

Area
  - Total: 9.7 km^{2} (3.7 sq mi)

Population (2021)
  - Total: 83
  - Density: 8.6/km^{2} (22/sq mi)
- Time zone: UTC+1 (CET)
  - Summer (DST): UTC+2 (CEST)

Glinska Poljana is a village in Croatia.

== Religion ==
=== Serbian Orthodox Church of the Transfiguration of the Lord ===
Serbian Orthodox Church of the Transfiguration of the Lord in Glinska Poljana was constructed in 1802. During the World War II Genocide of Serbs in the Independent State of Croatia the church was converted to a Roman Catholic one and was a site of forced religious conversion. Church's valuable iconostasis was dismantled and transferred to the Catholic Parish Seat in Petrinja. It was returned to the church after the end of war and the building reconstruction was completed in 1991, just before the beginning of the Croatian War of Independence. On 9 October 1991, Croatian Army mined and destroyed the church which was at the front line between the government forces and self-declared Republic of Serbian Krajina. The church was not reconstructed after the end of war and the site was potentially minefield.
