= Hrvatski Čuntić =

- Village
- Location of Hrvatski Čuntić in Croatia
- Coordinates: 45°27′N 16°15′E
- Country: Croatia
- Region: Continental Croatia (Banovina)
- County: Sisak-Moslavina
- Municipality: Petrinja

Area
  - Total: 0.89 sq mi (2.3 km^{2})

Population (2021)
  - Total: 42
  - Density: 47/sq mi (18/km^{2})
- Time zone: UTC+1 (CET)
  - Summer (DST): UTC+2 (CEST)
- Postal number: 44250 Petrinja
- Area code: (+385) 44

Hrvatski Čuntić is a village in central Croatia, in the Town of Petrinja, Sisak-Moslavina County. It is connected by the D30 highway.

== History ==
Archaeological site of the ruins of the Čuntić Tower is in recent years available for visitors after the excessive vegetation was removed. The tower was constructed in 1551 by the Kaptol to overlook the passage on a medieval road.

== Demographics ==
According to the 2011 census, the village of Hrvatski Čuntić has 86 inhabitants. This represents 38.57% of its pre-war population according to the 1991 census.

Population change 1857-2011
v

population	309	358	394	470	514	571	604	612	292	289	330	310	259	223	125	86
	1857	1869	1880	1890	1900	1910	1921	1931	1948	1953	1961	1971	1981	1991	2001	2011

Sources: Croatian Bureau of Statistics publications

Note: Settlements of Hrvatski Čuntić and Srpski Čuntić were reported separately from the 1948 census onwards. From 1857 to 1931, Hrvatski Čuntić and Srpski Čuntić were reported as single settlement of Čuntić.
