= Mokrice =

Mokrice may refer to several places:

- Mokrice, Bosnia and Herzegovina, a village near Bosanska Gradiška
- Mokrice, Croatia, a village near Oroslavje
- Mokrice Castle in Slovenia
- Gornje Mokrice, a village near Petrinja, Croatia
