= Moštanica =

- Village
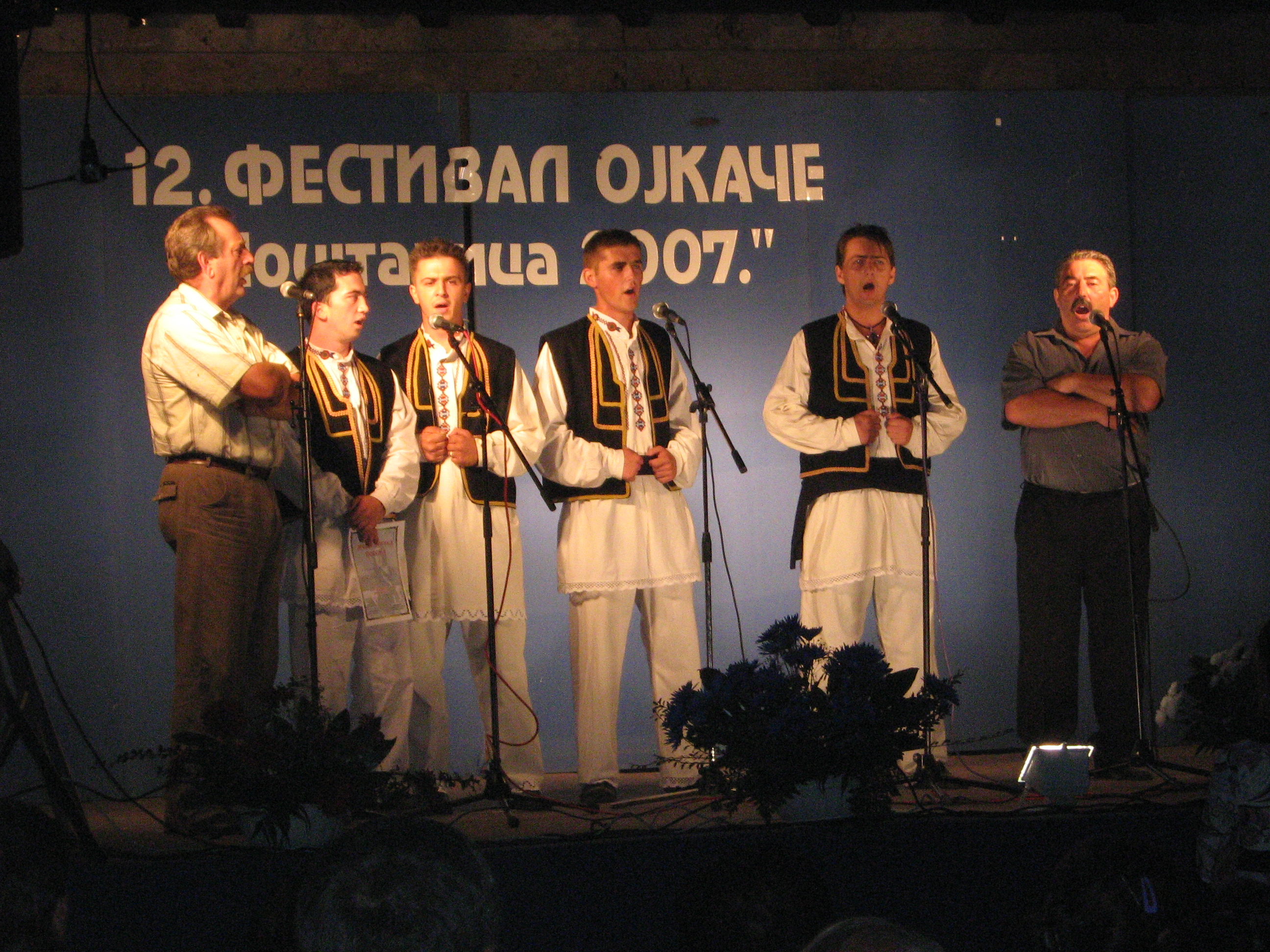
- 2007 Ojkanje festival in Moštanica

- Location of Moštanica in Croatia
- Coordinates: 45°22′N 16°21′E
- Country: Croatia
- Region: Continental Croatia (Banovina)
- County: Sisak-Moslavina
- Municipality: Petrinja

Area
  - Total: 8.0 km^{2} (3.1 sq mi)

Population (2021)
  - Total: 67
  - Density: 8.4/km^{2} (22/sq mi)
- Time zone: UTC+1 (CET)
  - Summer (DST): UTC+2 (CEST)
- Postal number: 44211 Blinjski Kut
- Area code: (+385) 44

Moštanica is a village in central Croatia, in the Town of Petrinja, Sisak-Moslavina County. It is connected by the D30 highway.

== Demographics ==
According to the 2011 census, the village of Moštanica had 93 inhabitants. This represents 34.44% of its pre-war population according to the 1991 census.

Population change 1857-2011
v

population	367	405	363	473	547	613	540	581	450	450	393	338	293	270	89	93
	1857	1869	1880	1890	1900	1910	1921	1931	1948	1953	1961	1971	1981	1991	2001	2011

Sources: Croatian Bureau of Statistics publications
