= Cepeliš =

- Village
- Location of Begovići in Croatia
- Coordinates: 45°24′39″N 16°16′13″E
- Country: Croatia
- Region: Continental Croatia (Banovina)
- County: Sisak-Moslavina
- Municipality: Petrinja

Area
  - Total: 3.6 km^{2} (1.4 sq mi)

Population (2021)
  - Total: 38
  - Density: 11/km^{2} (27/sq mi)
- Time zone: UTC+1 (CET)
  - Summer (DST): UTC+2 (CEST)
- Postal code: 44250
- Area code: (+385) 44

Cepeliš is a village in central Croatia, in the Town of Petrinja, Sisak-Moslavina County. It is connected by the D30 highway.

== Demographics ==
According to the 2011 census, the village of Cepeliš has 59 inhabitants. This represents 27.70% of its pre-war population according to the 1991 census.

Population change 1857-2011
v

population	150	138	143	170	189	231	237	274	300	310	280	249	225	213	70	59
	1857	1869	1880	1890	1900	1910	1921	1931	1948	1953	1961	1971	1981	1991	2001	2011

Sources: Croatian Bureau of Statistics publications
