= Gornja Bačuga =

- Village
- Location of Gornja Bačuga in Croatia
- Coordinates: 45°22′59″N 16°16′01″E
- Country: Croatia
- Region: Continental Croatia (Banovina)
- County: Sisak-Moslavina
- Municipality: Petrinja

Area
  - Total: 6.2 km^{2} (2.4 sq mi)
- Elevation: 140 m (460 ft)

Population (2021)
  - Total: 49
  - Density: 7.9/km^{2} (20/sq mi)
- Time zone: UTC+1 (CET)
  - Summer (DST): UTC+2 (CEST)
- Postal code: 44204 Jabukovac
- Area code: (+385) 44

Gornja Bačuga is a village in central Croatia, in the Town of Petrinja, Sisak-Moslavina County. It is connected by the D30 highway.

== Demographics ==
According to the 2011 census, the village of Gornja Bačuga had 79 inhabitants. This represents 19.90% of its pre-war population according to the 1991 census.

Population change 1857-2011
v

population				397	446		660		531	566	567	522	444	397	83	79
	1857	1869	1880	1890	1900	1910	1921	1931	1948	1953	1961	1971	1981	1991	2001	2011

Sources: Croatian Bureau of Statistics publications
