= Veliki Šušnjar =

- Village
- Location of Veliki Šušnjar in Croatia
- Coordinates: 45°19′07″N 16°15′09″E
- Country: Croatia
- Region: Continental Croatia (Banovina)
- County: Sisak-Moslavina
- Municipality: Petrinja

Area
  - Total: 9.5 km^{2} (3.7 sq mi)

Population (2021)
  - Total: 65
  - Density: 6.8/km^{2} (18/sq mi)
- Time zone: UTC+1 (CET)
  - Summer (DST): UTC+2 (CEST)
- Postal code: 44204 Jabukovac
- Area code: (+385) 44

Veliki Šušnjar is a village in central Croatia, in the Town of Petrinja, Sisak-Moslavina County.

== Demographics ==
According to the 2011 census, the village of Veliki Šušnjar had 141 inhabitants. This represents 27.71% of its pre-war population according to the 1991 census.

Population change 1857-2011
v

population	802	919	861	990	926	972	929	988	623	626	644	603	514	455	108	117
	1857	1869	1880	1890	1900	1910	1921	1931	1948	1953	1961	1971	1981	1991	2001	2011

Sources: Croatian Bureau of Statistics publications
