= Dumače =

Coordinates: 45°28′N 16°10′E

- Village
- Interactive map of Dumače
- Country: Croatia
- Region: Continental Croatia (Banovina)
- County: Sisak-Moslavina
- Municipality: Petrinja

Area
  - Total: 2.5 km^{2} (0.97 sq mi)

Population (2021)
  - Total: 240
  - Density: 96/km^{2} (250/sq mi)
- Time zone: UTC+1 (CET)
  - Summer (DST): UTC+2 (CEST)

Dumače is a village in Croatia.
