= Čuntić =

- Village
- Location of Čuntić in Croatia
- Coordinates: 45°21′N 16°17′E
- Country: Croatia
- Region: Continental Croatia (Banovina)
- County: Sisak-Moslavina
- Municipality: Petrinja

Area
  - Total: 0.73 sq mi (1.9 km^{2})

Population (2021)
  - Total: 16
  - Density: 22/sq mi (8.4/km^{2})
- Time zone: UTC+1 (CET)
  - Summer (DST): UTC+2 (CEST)
- Postal number: 44250 Petrinja
- Area code: (+385) 44

Čuntić (known as Srpski Čuntić until 2001 census) is a village in central Croatia, in the Town of Petrinja, Sisak-Moslavina County. It is connected by the D30 highway.

== Demographics ==
According to the 2011 census, the village of Čuntić had 27 inhabitants. This represents 25.23% of its pre-war population according to the 1991 census.

Population change 1857-2011
v

| population | | | | | | | | | 131 | 144 | 158 | 138 | 114 | 107 | 21 | 27 |
| | 1857 | 1869 | 1880 | 1890 | 1900 | 1910 | 1921 | 1931 | 1948 | 1953 | 1961 | 1971 | 1981 | 1991 | 2001 | 2011 |

Sources: Croatian Bureau of Statistics publications

Note: Settlements of Hrvatski Čuntić and Srpski Čuntić were reported separately from the 1948 census onwards. Srpski Čuntić was renamed to Čuntić prior to the 2001 census. From 1857 to 1931, Hrvatski Čuntić and Srpski Čuntić were reported as single settlement of Čuntić.
