= Petrinja killings =

1991 mass murder of Croat civilians

- Part of the Croatian War of Independence
- Petrinja on the map of Croatia, JNA/SAO Krajina-held areas in late 1991 are highlighted in red
- Location: 45.440128°N 16.279020°E; Petrinja, Croatia
- Date: September 1991 - June 1992
- Target: Croats
- Attack type: Mass murder, ethnic cleansing
- Deaths: 250+ (according to Croatian sources)
- Perpetrators: JNA, Serb rebels, Serb paramilitaries

The Petrinja Killings refers to a series of mass murders and other crimes that were committed by various Serb forces against Croat POWs and civilians, from September 1991 until June 1992, in the town of Petrinja and in surrounding areas.

Croats were killed over several months, both during the battle to control the town and later during the occupation; in indiscriminate artillery attacks against civilian areas and in instances of wilful killings against civilians and POWs. Croatian sources state that over 250 people were killed (including at least 120 civilians) during these crimes.

== Background ==
A crisis emerged in Yugoslavia with the weakening of the communist states in Eastern Europe towards the end of the Cold War. In Croatia, the regional branch of the League of Communists of Yugoslavia, the League of Communists of Croatia, had lost its ideological potency. The Republics of Slovenia and Croatia advocated decentralization. Republic of Serbia, headed by Slobodan Milošević, adhered to centralism and single-party rule. On 8 July 1989, a large Serb nationalist rally was held in Knin, during which banners threatening Yugoslav People's Army (JNA) intervention in Croatia, as well as Chetnik iconography, were displayed. In 1990, ethnic tensions between Serbs and Croats worsened after the electoral defeat of the government of the Socialist Republic of Croatia by the Croatian Democratic Union (Croatian: Hrvatska demokratska zajednica – HDZ). The Yugoslav People's Army (Serbian: Jugoslovenska Narodna Armija – JNA) confiscated Croatia's Territorial Defence (Croatian: Teritorijalna obrana – TO) weapons to minimize resistance. On 17 August, the tensions escalated into an open revolt of the Croatian Serbs, centred on the predominantly Serb-populated areas of the Dalmatian hinterland around Knin (approximately 60 kilometres (37 miles) north-east of Split), parts of the Lika, Kordun, Banovina and eastern Croatia. In January 1991, Serbia, supported by Montenegro and Serbia's provinces of Vojvodina and Kosovo, unsuccessfully tried to obtain the Yugoslav Presidency's approval for a JNA operation to disarm Croatian security forces. The request was denied and a bloodless skirmish between Serb insurgents and Croatian special police in March prompted the JNA itself to ask the Federal Presidency to give it wartime authority and declare a state of emergency. Even though it was backed by Serbia and its allies, the JNA request was refused on 15 March. Serbian President Slobodan Milošević, preferring a campaign to expand Serbia rather than to preserve Yugoslavia with Croatia as a federal unit, publicly threatened to replace the JNA with a Serbian army and declared that he no longer recognized the authority of the federal Presidency. The threat caused the JNA to abandon plans to preserve Yugoslavia in favour of expansion of Serbia as the JNA came under Milošević's control. By the end of March, the conflict had escalated with the first fatalities. In early April, leaders of the Serb revolt in Croatia declared their intention to amalgamate the areas under their control with Serbia. These were viewed by the Government of Croatia as breakaway regions.

At the beginning of 1991, Croatia had no regular army. To bolster its defence, Croatia doubled its police numbers to about 20,000. The most effective part of the Croatian police force was 3,000-strong special police comprising twelve battalions organised along military lines. There were also 9,000–10,000 regionally organised reserve police in 16 battalions and 10 companies, but they lacked weapons. In response to the deteriorating situation, the Croatian government established the Croatian National Guard (Croatian: Zbor narodne garde – ZNG) in May by expanding the special police battalions into four all-professional guards brigades. Under Ministry of Defence control and commanded by retired JNA General Martin Špegelj, the four guards brigades comprised approximately 8,000 troops. The reserve police, also expanded to 40,000, was attached to the ZNG and reorganised into 19 brigades and 14 independent battalions. The guards brigades were the only units of the ZNG that were fully equipped with small arms; throughout the ZNG there was a lack of heavier weapons and there was poor command and control structure above the brigade level. The shortage of heavy weapons was so severe that the ZNG resorted to using World War II weapons taken from museums and film studios. At the time, the Croatian weapon stockpile consisted of 30,000 small arms purchased abroad and 15,000 previously owned by the police. To replace the personnel lost to the guards brigades, a new 10,000-strong special police was established.

JNA and other Serb forces led an attack against Petrinja and surrounding areas from 2 September until the town fell on 21 September 1991.

== Timeline ==
On the 2, 16 and 21 September 1991, JNA commander, Slobodan Tarbuk, ordered the indiscriminate shelling of civilian populated areas of Petrinja, in order to deter HV forces from approaching the "Vasilj Gaćeša" military barracks. These attacks caused heavy damage to private homes, businesses and two churches and caused civilian casualties. Between 2 and 21 September 1991, 26 residents were killed during these attacks. The deadliest attack occurred on 16 September 1991, when Tarbuk ordered a mortar attack on civilians in Petrinja, causing five civilian deaths and 13 injuries.

Tarbuk was alleged to have said "I swear on their Ustaša mothers that I will flatten Petrinja to the ground".

Mass killings were perpetrated against Croat civilians and POWs during the Battle of Petrinja and during the occupation. On 16 September, a group of 25 Croatian soldiers and MUP police officers attempted to surrender to members of the Serb Territorial Defence and SAO Krajina police forces at Vila Gavrilović, a pre-war catering facility. Once disarmed, the 25 POWs were executed. Four of the prisoners survived with serious injuries while the remainder were killed. A mass grave with the remains of 19 victims was exhumed by Croatian authorities on 14 September 1995.

Executions of POWs were also alleged to have taken place at the Vasilj Gaćeša barracks. On 16 September 1991, a group of 23 Croatian soldiers were interrogated and tortured by JNA troops and Serb paramilitaries for several hours before being executed by firing squad.

Petrinja fell to Serb forces on 21 September 1991. In occupied Petrinja and surrounding villages, Serb forces committed numerous crimes against Croatian civilians who did not want to leave their homes, but also some Serb civilians who did not agree with such a policy.

Throughout September 1991, Serb territorial defence and local militia forces killed 31 Croats in five surrounding villages, many more were injured or expelled.

The highest number of murders committed against the remaining Croatian civilians in this area was recorded in the period from September to December 1991, and even until June 1992, when several entire families were killed in their homes, in the streets or disappeared, in addition to numerous individual killings and abductions of civilians. The highest number of casualties in the city of Petrinja, occurred in September 1991, when 98 people were killed, and in just three days of that same month, 53 people were killed or disappeared.

On 6 October 1991, Serb paramilitaries burned down the nearby village of Nova Drenčina, killing at least two Croats; a civilian and a ZNG POW.

On the 5 November 1991, four members of the Kozbašić family (including two young children, 8 and 13 years of age) were murdered by SAO Krajina forces.

On 22 or 23 December 1991, Serb paramilitaries murdered three members of the Križević family.

Members of the Serb unit that murdered the Križević family also abducted and killed Stjepan and Paula Cindrić, both local dentists, on 6 January 1992.

From October 1991 to June 1992, JNA, TO units and Serb paramilitaries killed 80 Croats in surrounding areas of the Petrinja municipality.

On 16 July 1993, Serb forces fired on a group of young Croats sunbathing on the bank of the Kupa River during a ceasefire. Zrinka Gmaz (aged 19) was killed, while her younger brother (aged 16) and cousin (aged 17) were both wounded in the shooting.

== Mass graves ==
After the liberation of Petrinja and surrounding areas during Operation Storm, Croatian authorities have found and exhumed 45 mass graves. In 1995, Croatian authorities found four mass graves with the remains of 46 Croat civilians (38 male and 8 female).

The remains of 21 elderly civilians were also found in a grave in the vicinity of a JNA barracks, outside of Petrinja.

On 16 March 2012, eight bodies (believed to be Croats killed in 1991) were discovered in the city's rubbish dump.

== War crime trials ==
Several Serbs have been indicted by Croatian authorities for crimes committed in Petrinja. Jovo Begović was arrested in 2006 in Germany, on the basis of an Interpol warrant, and was extradited to Croatia. On 25 April 2007, Begović was found guilty of conducting deadly and indiscriminate mortar attacks against civilians in September 1991. He was sentenced by a district court in Sisak to five years in prison.

In February 2018, Slobodan Mutić was extradited from the United States, accused of involvement in the murder of Stjepan and Paula Cindrić in 1992. He was acquitted in December 2019. However, another Serb fighter, Dragan Perenčević, was found guilty and sent to 15 years imprisonment in absentia.

In July 2015, the Croatian Justice Ministry confirmed plans to seek the extradition of Predrag Japranin from Australia, accused of murdering three Croat civilians from Petrinja in November 1991.

On 31 October 2017, three former-Krajina Serb fighters were given sentences of between 5 1/2 and 7 1/2 years for burning down the Croatian village of Nova Drenčina. All three were tried and sentenced in absentia.

== Sources ==
- Hoare, Marko Attila (2010). "The War of Yugoslav Succession". In Ramet, Sabrina P. (ed.). Central and Southeast European Politics Since 1989. Cambridge: Cambridge University Press. pp. 111–136. ISBN 978-1-139-48750-4.
- Ramet, Sabrina P. (2006). The Three Yugoslavias: State-Building And Legitimation, 1918–2006. Bloomington, Indiana: Indiana University Press. ISBN 978-0-253-34656-8.
- "Roads Sealed as Yugoslav Unrest Mounts". The New York Times. Reuters. 19 August 1990. Archived from the original on 21 September 2013.
- "The Prosecutor vs. Milan Martic – Judgement" (PDF). International Criminal Tribunal for the former Yugoslavia. 12 June 2007.
- Engelberg, Stephen (3 March 1991). "Belgrade Sends Troops to Croatia Town". The New York Times. Archived from the original on 2 October 2013.
- Sudetic, Chuck (2 April 1991). "Rebel Serbs Complicate Rift on Yugoslav Unity". The New York Times. Archived from the original on 2 October 2013.
- Central Intelligence Agency, Office of Russian and European Analysis (2002). Balkan Battlegrounds: A Military History of the Yugoslav Conflict, 1990–1995. Washington, D.C.: Central Intelligence Agency. ISBN 9780160664724. OCLC 50396958.
- Eastern Europe and the Commonwealth of Independent States. London, England: Routledge. 1999. ISBN 978-1-85743-058-5.
