= Donja Budičina =

- Village
- Location within Croatia
- Coordinates: 45.381331°N 16.314526°E
- Country: Croatia
- Region: Continental Croatia (Banovina)
- County: Sisak-Moslavina
- Municipality: Petrinja

Area
  - Total: 5.3 km^{2} (2.0 sq mi)
- Elevation: 159 m (522 ft)

Population (2021)
  - Total: 196
  - Density: 37/km^{2} (96/sq mi)
- Time zone: UTC+1 (CET)
  - Summer (DST): UTC+2 (CEST)
- Postal code: 44250
- Area code: 044

Donja Budičina is a village in Banovina region of Croatia. The settlement is administratively located the Town of Petrinja and the Sisak-Moslavina County. According to the 2001 census, the village has 247 inhabitants. It is connected by the D30 state road.

== Religion ==
=== Roman Catholic Chapel of the Immaculate Conception ===
Historical wooden Roman Catholic Chapel of the Immaculate Conception stood in the village until 1991 when it was completely destroyed by the Yugoslav People's Army and the forces of the self-proclaimed Republic of Serbian Krajina. The chapel was constructed in 1740, in 1741 its baroque altar was installed and the new roof was constructed in 1779. Today there are only foundations of the building visible at the site.

=== Serbian Orthodox Church of the Saint Stephen ===
Serbian Orthodox Church of the Saint Stephen was constructed in 1846. It was destroyed in 1941 by the local communists and its reconstruction started in 1977 but was never completed.
