= Jošavica, Croatia =

Jošavica
- Village
- Location of Jošavica in Croatia
- Coordinates: 45°19′35″N 16°21′40″E
- Country: Croatia
- Region: Continental Croatia (Banovina)
- County: Sisak-Moslavina
- Municipality: Petrinja

Area
  - Total: 9.3 km^{2} (3.6 sq mi)
- Elevation: 362 m (1,188 ft)

Population (2021)
  - Total: 62
  - Density: 6.7/km^{2} (17/sq mi)
- Time zone: UTC+1 (CET)
  - Summer (DST): UTC+2 (CEST)
- Postal number: 44231 Blinja
- Area code: (+385) 44

Jošavica is a village in central Croatia, in the Town of Petrinja, Sisak-Moslavina County. It is connected by the D30 highway.

== Demographics ==
According to the 2011 census, the village of Jošavica has 84 inhabitants. This represents 19.44% of its pre-war population according to the 1991 census.

According to the 1991 census, 98.38% of the village population were ethnic Serbs (425/432), 0.23% were ethnic Croats (1/432), while 1.39% were of other ethnic origin (6/432).

Population change 1857-2011
v

population	585	682	743	850	908	1004	893	981	672	661	641	555	501	432	82	84
	1857	1869	1880	1890	1900	1910	1921	1931	1948	1953	1961	1971	1981	1991	2001	2011

Sources: Croatian Bureau of Statistics publications

== Religion ==
Serbian Orthodox Church of Saint George was built in the village in the mid 19th century. Most probably it was constructed on the site of earlier wooden church. The building was damaged during the World War II and its reconstruction was completed in 1968. As of 2008 a new reconstruction of deteriorated building, funded by the Ministry of Culture, was not completed.

== Notable natives and residents ==
- Živko Juzbašić (1924–2015) - antifascist and partisan fighter, politician
