= Nebojan =

Coordinates: 45°29′N 16°12′E

- Village
- Interactive map of Nebojan
- Country: Croatia
- Region: Continental Croatia (Banovina)
- County: Sisak-Moslavina
- Municipality: Petrinja

Area
  - Total: 12.6 km^{2} (4.9 sq mi)

Population (2021)
  - Total: 141
  - Density: 11.2/km^{2} (29.0/sq mi)
- Time zone: UTC+1 (CET)
  - Summer (DST): UTC+2 (CEST)

Nebojan is a village in Croatia.

== History ==
At the meeting of the Sabor of Croatia and Slavonia in 1588, it was ordered that a tower be constructed immediately in Nebojan, owing to the Turkish threat.
