= Nova Drenčina =

Coordinates: 45°27′22″N 16°19′24″E

- Village
- Interactive map of Nova Drenčina
- Country: Croatia
- Region: Continental Croatia (Banovina)
- County: Sisak-Moslavina
- Municipality: Petrinja

Area
  - Total: 6.5 km^{2} (2.5 sq mi)

Population (2021)
  - Total: 315
  - Density: 48/km^{2} (130/sq mi)
- Time zone: UTC+1 (CET)
  - Summer (DST): UTC+2 (CEST)

Nova Drenčina is a village in Croatia. It is located between Petrinja and Sisak.
