= Novi Farkašić =

Coordinates: 45°29′N 16°09′E

- Village
- Interactive map of Novi Farkašić
- Country: Croatia
- Region: Continental Croatia (Banovina)
- County: Sisak-Moslavina
- Municipality: Petrinja

Area
  - Total: 9.2 km^{2} (3.6 sq mi)

Population (2021)
  - Total: 67
  - Density: 7.3/km^{2} (19/sq mi)
- Time zone: UTC+1 (CET)
  - Summer (DST): UTC+2 (CEST)

Novi Farkašić is a village in Croatia.
