= Gornje Mokrice =

Coordinates: 45°26′20″N 16°12′18″E

- Village
- Interactive map of Gornje Mokrice
- Country: Croatia
- Region: Continental Croatia (Banovina)
- County: Sisak-Moslavina
- Municipality: Petrinja

Area
  - Total: 4.9 km^{2} (1.9 sq mi)

Population (2021)
  - Total: 84
  - Density: 17/km^{2} (44/sq mi)
- Time zone: UTC+1 (CET)
  - Summer (DST): UTC+2 (CEST)

Gornje Mokrice is a village in Croatia.
