= Miočinovići =

Coordinates: 45°16′29″N 16°17′16″E

- Village
- Interactive map of Miočinovići
- Country: Croatia
- Region: Continental Croatia (Banovina)
- County: Sisak-Moslavina
- Municipality: Petrinja

Area
  - Total: 15.9 km^{2} (6.1 sq mi)

Population (2021)
  - Total: 26
  - Density: 1.6/km^{2} (4.2/sq mi)
- Time zone: UTC+1 (CET)
  - Summer (DST): UTC+2 (CEST)

Miočinovići is a village in Croatia.
