= Knin camp =

Serbian detention camp (1991–1992)

- Concentration camp
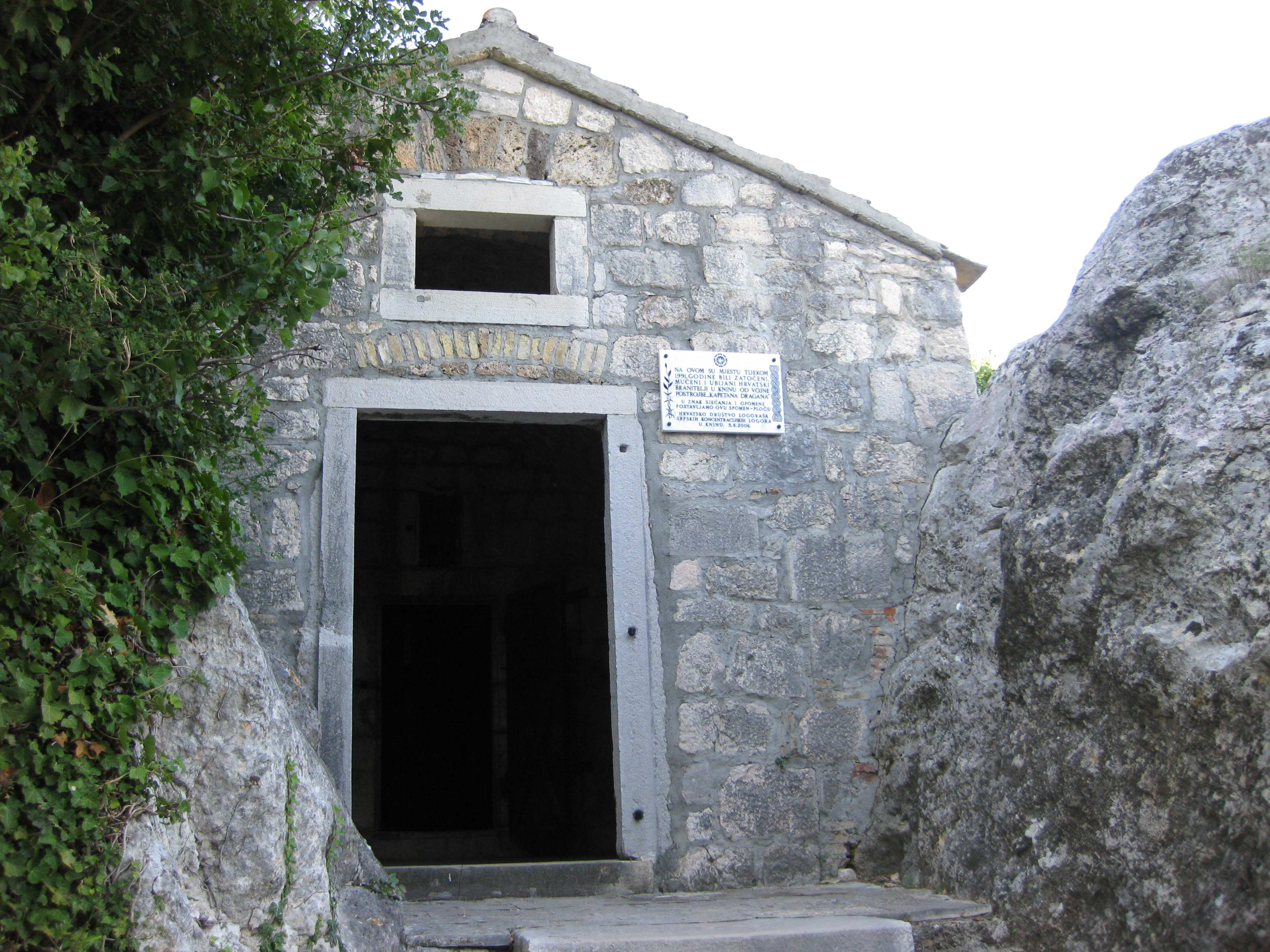
- Memorial place in Knin where Croats were once detained and tortured by Serbian troops in 1991

- Location of Knin in Croatia
- Coordinates: 44°02′29″N 16°11′55″E
- Location: Knin, Croatia
- Operated by: Yugoslav People's Army and Croatian Serb forces
- Operational: 1991–1992
- Inmates: Croat detainees, soldiers and civilians
- Number of inmates: c. 120 – 150
- Killed: 2

Knin camp was a detention camp run by the Serbian Army of Krajina in Knin, the capital of the Serb-held part of Croatia known as Republic of Serbian Krajina, that held Croatian detainees, soldiers and civilians, from 1991 until 1992, during the Croatian War of Independence.

== History ==
It consisted out of at least two facilities. The ICTY stated that a prison in Knin, run by the Yugoslav People's Army, held approximately 150 detainees, while the old hospital in Knin, run by "Martic's Militia", held approximately 120 detainees. At least two prisoners perished.

Former prisoners testified that they were arrested by Serb paramilitary forces and then deported into Knin camp. The detainees were beaten, mistreated and humiliated. Some were threatened to read a written testimony in front of TV cameras from Belgrade and confess crimes against Serbs which they did not commit. One Croatian soldier testified that he was interrogated for 68 consecutive days and received food and water only once a day. Two Catholic priests, Mirko Barbarić and Franjo Halužan, were arrested in Benkovac and then brought to the Knin prison. There one Serb soldier ordered Halužan to make the sign of the cross with three fingers. After that gesture, the soldier kicked his arm with a baton. Other prisoners testified they were forced to eat two full spoons of salt and then drink 0,4 gallons of water at once. Some were tortured with electro shocks, had to eat cigarette ash, wash the toilette floors with their tongues and perform oral sex under threat of murder.

In July 1991, Ivica Knez succumbed to heavy beatings and became the first Croatian casualty in a Krajina camp. Detainees were exchanged and released from the camp at the end of 1991 and beginning of 1992.

== Trials ==
On July 3, 2008, the War Crimes Council of the Šibenik County Court found the defendant Saša Počuča guilty of a war crime against civilians and a war crime against war prisoners in Knin camp and sentenced him to 8 years in prison. He was found to have been a guard in the prison where he tortured and mistreated prisoners.

The ICTY indicted Slobodan Milošević for abuses in Knin camp. Milan Martić was sentenced to 35 years in prison, among others for abuses in the camp. Dragan Vasiljković was also indicted for crimes at Knin camp. He fled to Australia where he was arrested in 2010 and is expecting transfer to Croatian authorities.

== Notes ==
1. At the time the camp was in operation, Knin was part of the self-proclaimed Republic of Serbian Krajina.
