= Drago Roksandić =

Croatian historian

- Born: 12 January 1948 (age 77); Petrinja, PR Croatia, PFR Yugoslavia
- Occupation: historian

Drago Roksandić (Serbian Cyrillic: Драго Роксандић; born 12 January 1948) is a Croatian historian and a former professor emeritus at the University of Zagreb. He was a full professor at the Department of History, Faculty of Humanities and Social Sciences and served as the head of the Chair of the History of Central and Southeastern Europe.

He was the leader of the Triplex Confinium international research project, focused on Croatia's borders in the Euro-Mediterranean context, which was founded in 1996, and the long-term cultural program Desničini susreti. Roksandić has been involved in many influential research projects, including the Local Approaches to the Second World War in Southeastern Europe at Humboldt University in Berlin. He has held various academic roles, including visiting lecturer at Yale University (1990), researcher at the Institute for Human Sciences in Vienna, and visiting professor at the Central European University in Budapest (1995–2002). Roksandić has participated in over 200 conferences in more than 30 countries.

== Biography ==
=== Early life ===
Drago Roksandić was born on January 12, 1948 in Petrinja. He attended elementary school in several cities, including Sisak and Zagreb, and later completed high school in Zagreb.

=== Education ===
Drago Roksandić studied philosophy and sociology in Zagreb (1966–67) before completing a history degree in Belgrade in 1975. He earned his doctorate in Zagreb in 1988 with a dissertation on the Military Frontier during the French Empire (1809–1813).

== Academic career ==
In 1978, he was appointed as an assistant at the Department of History of Yugoslav Peoples in the Modern Age at the University of Belgrade, and by 1980, he became an assistant at the same department. Roksandić worked as an assistant at the Faculty of Philosophy in Belgrade until 1989, then as a docent at the Faculty of Humanities and Social Sciences in Zagreb (1990–96), becoming an associate professor in 1997 and a full professor in 2003.

== Controversies ==
In 2019 Roksandić was accused of sexual harassment by five female students. Despite these allegations, the University of Zagreb, under Rector Damir Boras, awarded him the title of professor emeritus, overlooking the accusations. In 2021, further media reports surfaced, alleging sexual misconduct based on testimonies from former anonymous students. One key allegation stemmed from an incident in 2016, where Roksandić was accused of inappropriate behavior. In response, Roksandić issued a public statement on February 10, 2021, denying the accusations and claiming he was the victim of a media lynching. He suggested that the allegations were linked to a personal dispute with Professor Neven Budak, following a proposal for Roksandić to become a professor emeritus. Roksandić claimed that Budak and others orchestrated a media campaign against him, spreading falsehoods and damaging his reputation. In May 2021, a committee investigating the case concluded that Roksandić had committed repeated and severe sexual misconduct, damaging the reputation of the faculty. The committee recommended that he lose his rights and privileges as a professor emeritus, including access to his faculty email account.

== Publications ==
=== Books ===
Publication list of Drago Roksandić include following books:

- Drago Roksandić (1991). Srbi u Hrvatskoj od 15. stoljeća do naših dana [Serbs in Croatia from the 15th Century to the Present Day]. Zagreb: Vjesnik.
- Drago Roksandić (1991). Srpska i hrvatska povijest i »nova historija« [Serbian and Croatian History and the "New History"]. Zagreb: Stvarnost.
- Drago Roksandić (1996). Protiv rata: prilozi povijesti iluzija [Against War: Contributions to the History of Illusions]. Zagreb: SKD Prosvjeta.
- Drago Roksandić (2003). Triplex Confinium ili o granicama i regijama hrvatske povijesti 1500–1800 [Triplex Confinium or On the Borders and Regions of Croatian History 1500–1800]. Zagreb: Barbat.
- Drago Roksandić (2004). Etnos, konfesija, tolerancija [Ethnos, Confession, Tolerance]. Zagreb: SKD Prosvjeta.
- Drago Roksandić (2006). Svetozar Borojević od Bojne (1856 – 1920). Lav ili Lisica sa Soče [Svetozar Borojević von Bojna (1856–1920): The Lion or the Fox of the Soča]. Zagreb: Council of the Serbian National Minority of the City of Zagreb.
- Drago Roksandić (2011). U NIN-u i Danasu [In NIN and Danas]. Zagreb: SKD Prosvjeta.
- Drago Roksandić; Vlatka Filipović Maligec (2016). Kultura hrvatskog antifašizma. Prvi kongres kulturnih radnika Hrvatske (Topusko, 25. – 27. lipnja 1944.). Između "mjesta pamćenja" i kritičke refleksije [The Culture of Croatian Antifascism. The First Congress of Cultural Workers of Croatia (Topusko, June 25–27, 1944). Between "Sites of Memory" and Critical Reflection]. Zagreb: Center for Comparative Historical and Intercultural Studies.
- Drago Roksandić (2017). Iluzija slobode. Ogledi o Vladanu Desnici [The Illusion of Freedom: Essays on Vladan Desnica]. Zagreb: Politička kultura, nakladno-istraživački zavod.
- Drago Roksandić (2018). Čovjek i prostor, čovjek u okolišu. Ekohistorijski ogledi [Human and Space, Man in the Environment: Ecohistorical Essays]. Zagreb & Zaprešić: Center for Comparative Historical and Intercultural Studies.
- Drago Roksandić (2018). Historiografija u tranziciji [Historiography in Transition]. Zagreb: SKD Prosvjeta.
