= Jabukovac, Croatia =

Jabukovac
- Village
- Location of Jabukovac in Croatia
- Coordinates: 45°19′44″N 16°17′42″E
- Country: Croatia
- Region: Croatia proper (Banovina)
- County: Sisak-Moslavina
- Municipality: Petrinja

Area
  - Total: 6.6 km^{2} (2.5 sq mi)
- Elevation: 140 m (460 ft)

Population (2021)
  - Total: 110
  - Density: 17/km^{2} (43/sq mi)
- Time zone: UTC+1 (CET)
  - Summer (DST): UTC+2 (CEST)
- Postal code: 44204 Jabukovac
- Area code: (+385) 44

Jabukovac is a village in central Croatia, in the Town of Petrinja, Sisak-Moslavina County. It is connected by the D30 highway.

== Demographics ==
According to the 2011 census, the village of Jabukovac had 141 inhabitants. This represents 43.38% of its pre-war population according to the 1991 census.

The 1991 census recorded that 86.77% of the village population were ethnic Serbs (282/325), 6.46% were Yugoslavs (21/325), 4.62% were ethnic Croats (15/325), while 2.15% were of other ethnic origin (7/325).

Historical population 1857-2011
v

population	315	370	408	528	614	561	552	596	365	328	356	351	333	325	163	141
	1857	1869	1880	1890	1900	1910	1921	1931	1948	1953	1961	1971	1981	1991	2001	2011

Sources: Croatian Bureau of Statistics publications

== Culture ==
- Zvuci Banije - an amateur group nurturing traditional folk singing and dancing

== Sights and events ==
- Banijsko prelo
