= Petrinja =

- Town
- Grad Petrinja; Town of Petrinja
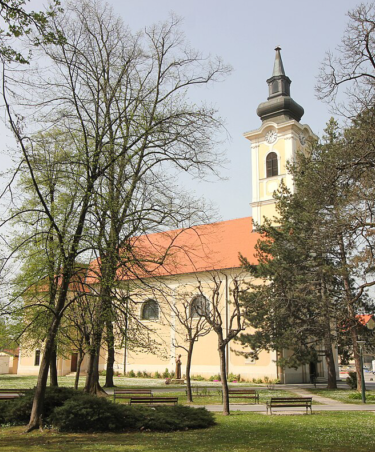
- St. Lawrance church

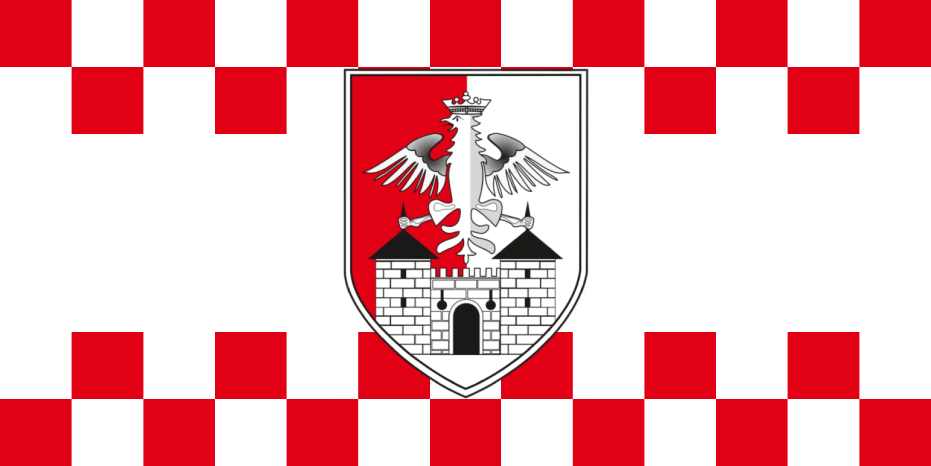
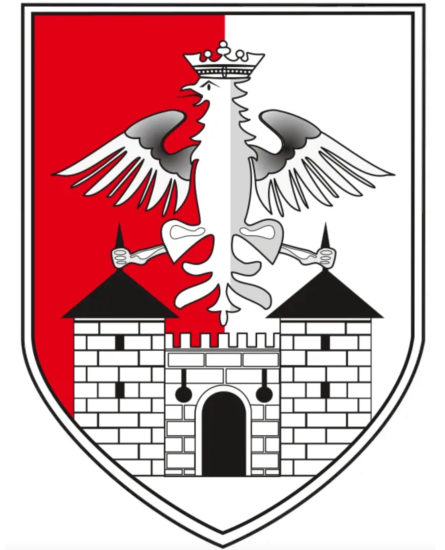
- Flag Seal
- Interactive map of Petrinja
- Location of Petrinja in Croatia
- Coordinates: 45°26′26″N 16°16′42″E
- Country: Croatia
- Region: Central Croatia (Banovina, Pokuplje)
- County: Sisak-Moslavina County

Government
  - Mayor: Magdalena Komes (HDZ)

Area
  - Town: 379.3 km^{2} (146.4 sq mi)
  - Urban: 39.4 km^{2} (15.2 sq mi)
- Elevation: 106 m (348 ft)

Population (2021)
  - Town: 19,950
  - Density: 52.60/km^{2} (136.2/sq mi)
  - Urban: 12,963
  - Urban density: 329/km^{2} (852/sq mi)
- Time zone: UTC+1 (CET)
  - Summer (DST): UTC+2 (CEST)
- Postal code: 44 250
- Area code: 044
- Vehicle registration: SK
- Website: petrinja.hr

Petrinja (pronounced [pětriːɲa]) is a town in central Croatia near Sisak in the historic region of Banovina. It is administratively located in Sisak-Moslavina County.

On December 29, 2020, the town was hit by a strong earthquake with a magnitude of 6.4 M_{w}, causing significant damage to the town.

== Name ==
The name of Petrinja has its roots in Greek πέτρα - pétra, meaning "stone" through Latin petrus. Another possibility is that Petrinja was named after the church of St. Peter from the time of the Diocese of Sisak. It is said that the town existed in Roman era in the area of Zrinska Gora, which is very rich in stone.

== Climate ==
Since records began in 1981, the highest temperature recorded at the local weather station was 39.1 °C (102.4 °F), on 14 August 2003. The coldest temperature was −27.6 °C (−17.7 °F), on 12 January 1985.

== History ==
=== Middle Ages ===
West of Petrinja is Petrova gora (Peter's mountain), site of the 1097 Battle of Gvozd Mountain between King Petar Snačić of Croatia and Coloman of Hungary.

The first written record of Petrinja as an inhabited settlement is the one about the benefits awarded to the inhabitants of Petrinja by the Slavonian duke Koloman in 1240. This old medieval Petrinja belongs to the time of warring with the Ottoman Empire.

=== 16th and 17th centuries ===
The old fortress was abandoned and destroyed in 1543, to prevent it from coming under Ottoman control. In 1592, Petrinja was given a new location with the construction and building of an Ottoman fortress at the confluence of the Petrinjčica and Kupa rivers. The fortress was to serve the Ottomans in their offensives in central Croatia, such as the 1593 battle of Sisak.

On August 10, 1594, the fortress was first liberated by the Croatian army. Therefore, August 10 has become the day of gratitude towards God and St. Lawrence, and this saint has been chosen for the patron saint of the parish and the town of Petrinja. Over time, Petrinja attracted craftsmen and merchants whose arrival marks the beginning of the town's development.

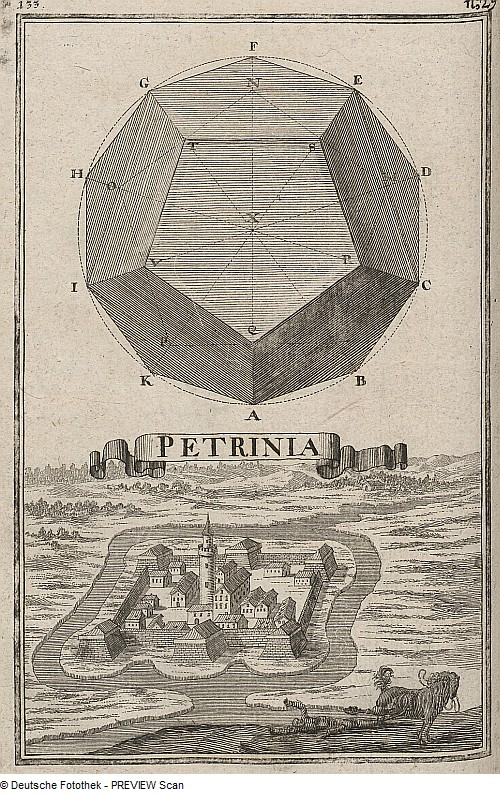
Petrinja–town and fortress, as an example of the use of geometry in fortress architecture, A.E.B. von Birckenstein, 1698

In the year 1773, Austrian empress Maria Theresa decided that Petrinja was to be a craft guild center for the entire territory of the Military Frontier.

=== 18th and 19th centuries ===
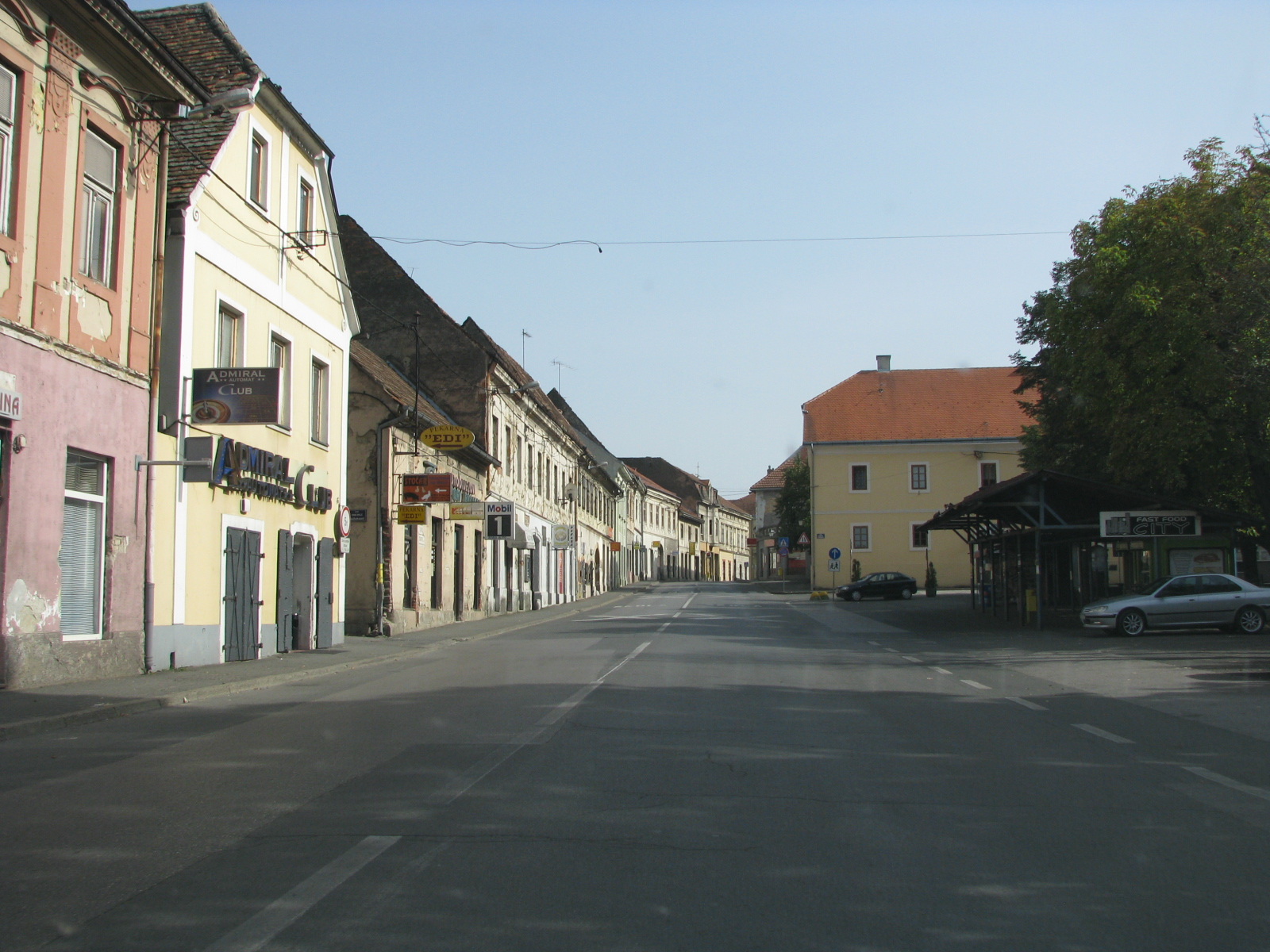
Old street in Petrinja, 2011

Petrinja was part of Napoleon's Illyria from 1809 till 1813 when the town became a significant trade and traffic center. In the same period, the French army planted the linden trees that stand to this day.

The influence of Croatian national revival in the 19th century was felt in Petrinja. That was the time of the founding of the Town Orchestra (1808), Music Department (1841), Library and reading-room (1842), Teachers' Training School (1862), Croatian Choir "Slavulj" (1864), Town fire-brigade (1880), First printing-house (1881).

In the late 19th and early 20th century, Petrinja was a district capital in the Zagreb County of the Kingdom of Croatia-Slavonia.

=== 20th and 21st centuries ===
From 1929 to 1939, Petrinja was part of the Sava Banovina and from 1939 to 1941 of the Banovina of Croatia within the Kingdom of Yugoslavia.

During the Second World War, with the establishment of the so-called Independent State of Croatia (a fascist puppet state), Petrinja and the surrounding area were the scene of persecution of the Serbian, Jewish and Roma minorities, but also of harsh repression of many Croatian anti-fascists, in a context of armed struggle between partisans and local collaborators of the Axis forces.

Recent history has witnessed the war in Croatia during which many people (Croats first, then the Serbs in 1995) were exiled from their hometown of Petrinja in the period from September 1991 to August 1995. The town itself has gone through severe damage. On November 25, 1991, the Serb mayor of Petrinja Radovan Marković sent a message to Željko Ražnatović to have his troops enter the city as part of a "2. motorized battalion" of the 622. Motorized Brigade of the then already Serbian-dominated Yugoslav People's Army.

During the occupation of Petrinja and surrounding areas, from September 1991 until August 1995, Serb forces committed numerous mass killings against Croat and other non-Serb civilians and POWs. More than 250 Croat and other non-Serb civilians and POWs were murdered during this period. After Operation Storm in August 1995, Croatian authorities were able to find and exhume 45 mass graves.

After Operation Storm in 1995, many monuments have been erected in memory of Croatian war heroes and victims of the war.

In reconstructing and rebuilding their town, the inhabitants of Petrinja took great care of the town's urban tradition by keeping the old customs alive, celebrating Catholic holidays, and organizing numerous cultural, social and sports events.

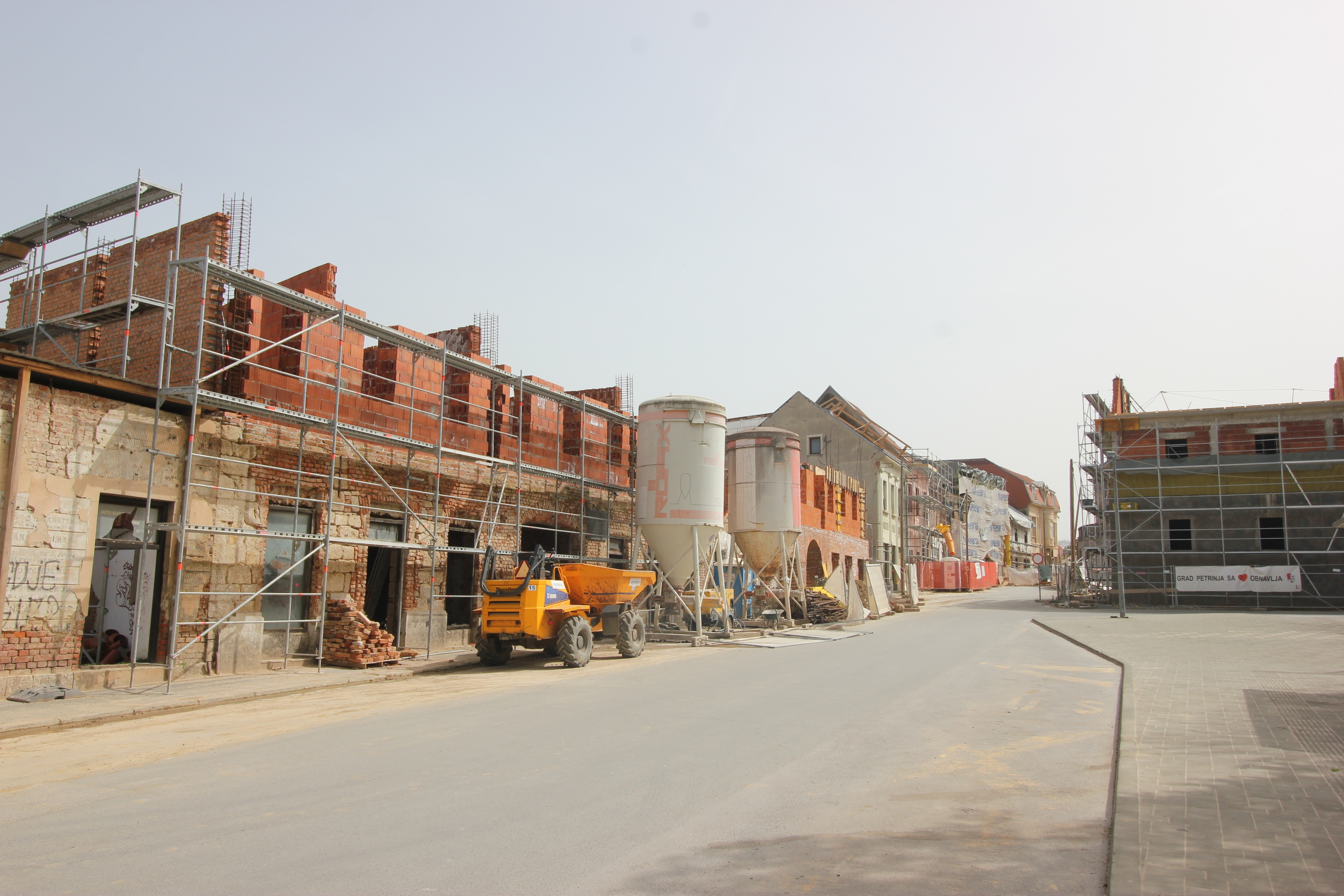
Reconstruction works in the city centre following the 2020 earthquake

On 29 December 2020, the town was struck by a violent earthquake of magnitude 6.4 M_{w}, killing seven people, including a seven-year-old girl. Half of the town was destroyed during the quake. At least 20 people were injured. A series of aftershocks continued to jolt the area, with 291 smaller tremors recorded during the subsequent days.

== Economy ==
City economy is in a major decline for the last 20 years. High impact of the war from the 1990s is felt through the abandonment and depopulation of many villages and closure of many farms which used to supply local meat packing plant Gavrilović and dairy processors from other cities. Gavrilović still remains the biggest company and employer in the city, currently employing about 800 workers.

Other notable industries are saw mills and wood flooring manufacturing. Former Finel furniture factory now mostly lays abandoned while there are current plans to activate part of its capacity for hardwood flooring manufacturing. Former Ciglana brick factory is now converted into a large saw mill called Nil-Ž and employs more than a 100 people.

Small entrepreneurship is still underdeveloped due to lack of a finished small business zone. City owned agency Poslovne Zone Petrinja has been announcing the opening of a small business zone at the suburb of Mošćenica for the last several years, but there are still no visible results.

Small family farming operations called O.P.G. have been registered by many small farmers but just a few are producing in larger quantity and being able to offer fresh or processed meat, fruits, vegetables, flowers and herbs to markets. Lack of local and national co-operative organization management is making small farmers not competitive enough to other EU producers. This stems from an inherent belief that co-op are a negative heritage from the socialist era of pre-1990 period and should not be established again, while at the same time people buy products produced by strong Italian, Austrian, French and German co-operatives.

City used to have a local transportation company called Slavijatrans, which operated local and regional bus lines and cargo transport with an extensive fleet of fuel, bulk and general cargo carrier trucks. Due to mismanagement and numerous cases of corruption on one hand, and lack of law enforcement in the field of passenger transport, many private taxi's took over the passenger traffic from the most profitable lines, while cargo traffic was gradually reduced to just a few trucks from a fleet of a few hundred trucks. Now the company is sold to a large national carried Čazmatrans and only operates local passenger lines.

- Gavrilović d.o.o. meat packing
- Ciglana brick factory
- Nil-Ž sawmill
- Finel furniture and flooring manufacturing
- TSH animal feed factory
- Slavijatrans (Čazmatrans) transportation company, public transit
- Rotomat specialty rotary sanding discs manufacturing
- Pekarne EDI bakery chain

== Traditional crafts and gastronomy ==
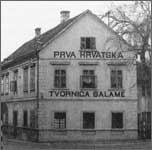
The Gavrilović house

After the liberation from Ottoman rule at the end of the 16th century, craftsmen and merchants relocated to Petrinja which contributed to the town's development. Pottery and ceramic crafts remain traditional in the area; many souvenirs are made from clay. The main souvenir produced in Petrinja is "stucka", an ornamented multi-use jar made of clay that has become a symbol of the town of Petrinja.

The foundations of the Prva hrvatska tvornica salame, sušena mesa i masti (first Croatian salami, cured meat and lard factory) were set in the year 1792, now developed into the "Gavrilović" factory, the principal factor of the area's economic development, well known for the quality of its gastronomical products.

== Landmarks ==
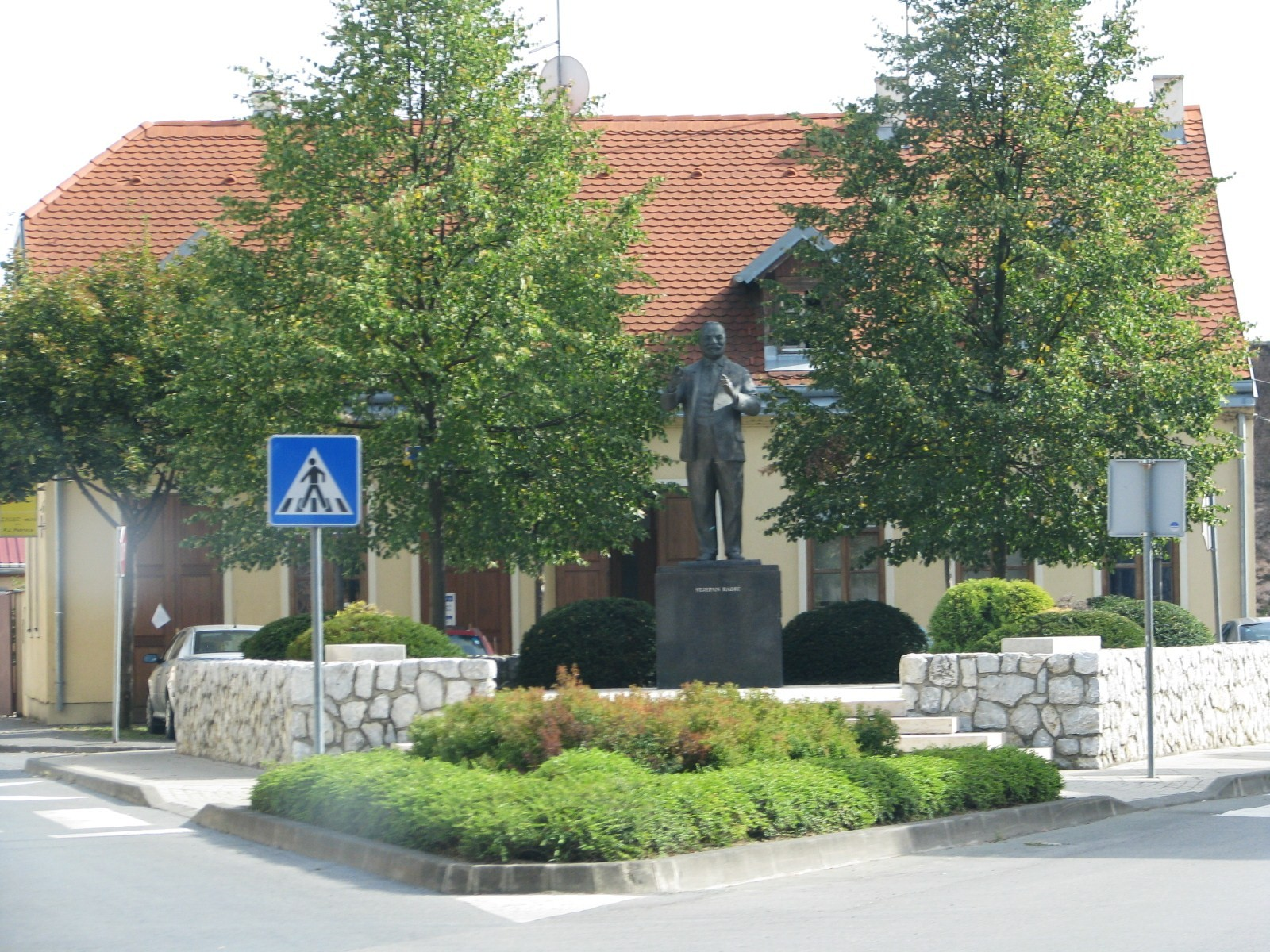
Stjepan Radić monument

The first Catholic parish Church of St. Lawrence was first built in 1603, but due to the time and type of building, a new one was built in 1781, in late baroque—classicist style.

A statue of Croatian politician Stjepan Radić was made in Petrinja in 1929 by Mila Wood after his assassination the previous year. In 1936, the statue was placed in the city's central square, which was named after him. In 1963 the communist regime moved the statue to a city park. In 1991, the statue was damaged and thrown into an orchard in a nearby village. It was not found until 1998, when it was restored. In 1999, it was restored to Petrinja's central square, and was unveiled by Croatian minister of culture Božo Biškupić.

Serbian Orthodox Church of St. Spiridon, built in 1785, was demolished in 1941 by order of the Ustaše authorities. A new church dedicated to St. Spiridon was constructed in 1976 near the original site, but it was razed again in 1991. Reconstruction began in 1994 during the existence of the self-proclaimed Republic of Serbian Krajina (1991-1995), but the walls built by 1995 were demolished by local authorities in 1997. The church was rebuilt for the fourth time between 2018 and 2021.

== Demographics ==
Historical population
Year	Pop.	±%
1869	20,403	—
1880	21,091	+3.4%
1890	24,958	+18.3%
1900	27,873	+11.7%
1910	29,633	+6.3%
1921	28,383	−4.2%
1931	29,808	+5.0%
1948	24,293	−18.5%
1953	25,070	+3.2%
1961	27,517	+9.8%
1981	33,570	+22.0%
1991	35,565	+5.9%
2001	23,413	−34.2%
2011	24,671	+5.4%
Source: Naselja i stanovništvo Republike Hrvatske 1857–2001, DZS, Zagreb, 2005 & Popis stanovništva 2011

As of 2011, Petrinja had a population of 24,671, of which 15,683 were living in the urban settlement.

The municipal area includes the following settlements (listed here with their respective 2011 population census numbers):

- Begovići, population 58
- Bijelnik, population 47
- Blinja, population 78
- Brest Pokupski, population 279
- Cepeliš, population 59
- Čuntić, population 27
- Deanovići, population 28
- Dodoši, population 76
- Donja Bačuga, population 142
- Donja Budičina, population 236
- Donja Mlinoga, population 96
- Donja Pastuša, population 11
- Donje Mokrice, population 57
- Dragotinci, population 63
- Dumače, population 272
- Glinska Poljana, population 121
- Gora, population 264
- Gornja Bačuga, population 79
- Gornja Mlinoga, population 33
- Gornja Pastuša, population 31
- Gornje Mokrice, population 105
- Graberje, population 155
- Grabovac Banski, population 200
- Hrastovica, population 464
- Hrvatski Čuntić, population 86
- Jabukovac, population 141
- Jošavica, population 84
- Klinac, population 27
- Kraljevčani, population 63
- Križ Hrastovički, population 141
- Luščani, population 163
- Mačkovo Selo, population 36
- Mala Gorica, population 510
- Međurače, population 36
- Miočinovići, population 43
- Mošćenica, population 2,470
- Moštanica, population 93
- Nebojan, population 191
- Nova Drenčina, population 402
- Novi Farkašić, population 81
- Novo Selište, population 321
- Pecki, population 84
- Petkovac, population 15
- Petrinja, population 15,683
- Prnjavor Čuntićki, population 79
- Sibić, population 67
- Slana, population 92
- Srednje Mokrice, population 33
- Strašnik, population 202
- Stražbenica, population 9
- Taborište, population 227
- Tremušnjak, population 47
- Veliki Šušnjar, population 117
- Vratečko, population 60
- Župić, population 85
Town of Petrinja: Population trends 1857–2021
v

population	18448	20403	21091	24958	27873	29633	28383	29808	24293	25070	27465	30545	33124	35151	23413	24671	19950
	1857	1869	1880	1890	1900	1910	1921	1931	1948	1953	1961	1971	1981	1991	2001	2011	2021

Sources: Croatian Bureau of Statistics publications

Population by ethnicity
Year of census	total	Croats	Serbs	others
1961	27,517	14,942 (54.30%)	11,955 (43.45%)	620 (2.25%)
1981	33,570	14,621 (43.55%)	12,617(37.58%)	6,332 (18.86%)
1991	35,565	15,791 (44.40%)	15,969 (44.90%)	3,805 (10.70%)
2001	23,413	19,280 (82.35%)	2,809 (12.00%)	1,324 (5.65%)
2011	24,671	20,925 (84.82%)	2,710 (10.98%)	1,036 (4.20%)

== Politics ==
=== Minority councils and representatives ===
Directly elected minority councils and representatives are tasked with consulting tasks for the local or regional authorities in which they are advocating for minority rights and interests, integration into public life and participation in the management of local affairs. At the 2023 Croatian national minorities councils and representatives elections Bosniaks and Serbs of Croatia fulfilled legal requirements to each elect their own 15 members minority council of the Town of Petrinja.

== Sports ==
The local chapter of the HPS is HPD "Zrin", which had 49 members in 1936 under the Matija Filjak presidency. At the time, it had a photography section. Membership fell to 45 in 1937.

== Notable people ==
Chronological list.

- Franjo Jelačić (1746–1810), officer from the House of Jelačić
- Stevan Šupljikac (1786–1848), military commander, duke of Serbian Vojvodina
- Janko Grahor (1827–1906), architect
- Emil Vojnović (1851–1927), Austro-Hungarian Army general, Director of the War Archives in Vienna
- Oton Kučera (1856–1931), astronomer
- Krsto Hegedušić (1901–1975), artist
- Branko Horvat (1928–2003), economist and politician
- Milan Nenadić (1943–), Greco-Roman wrestler
- Drago Roksandić (1948-), historian
- Marijan Vlak (1955–), former football goalkeeper
- Vlado Lisjak (1962–), Greco-Roman wrestler
- Aleksandar Jovančević (1970–), Greco-Roman wrestler
