= NUTS statistical regions of Croatia =

Territorial unit standard for Croatia

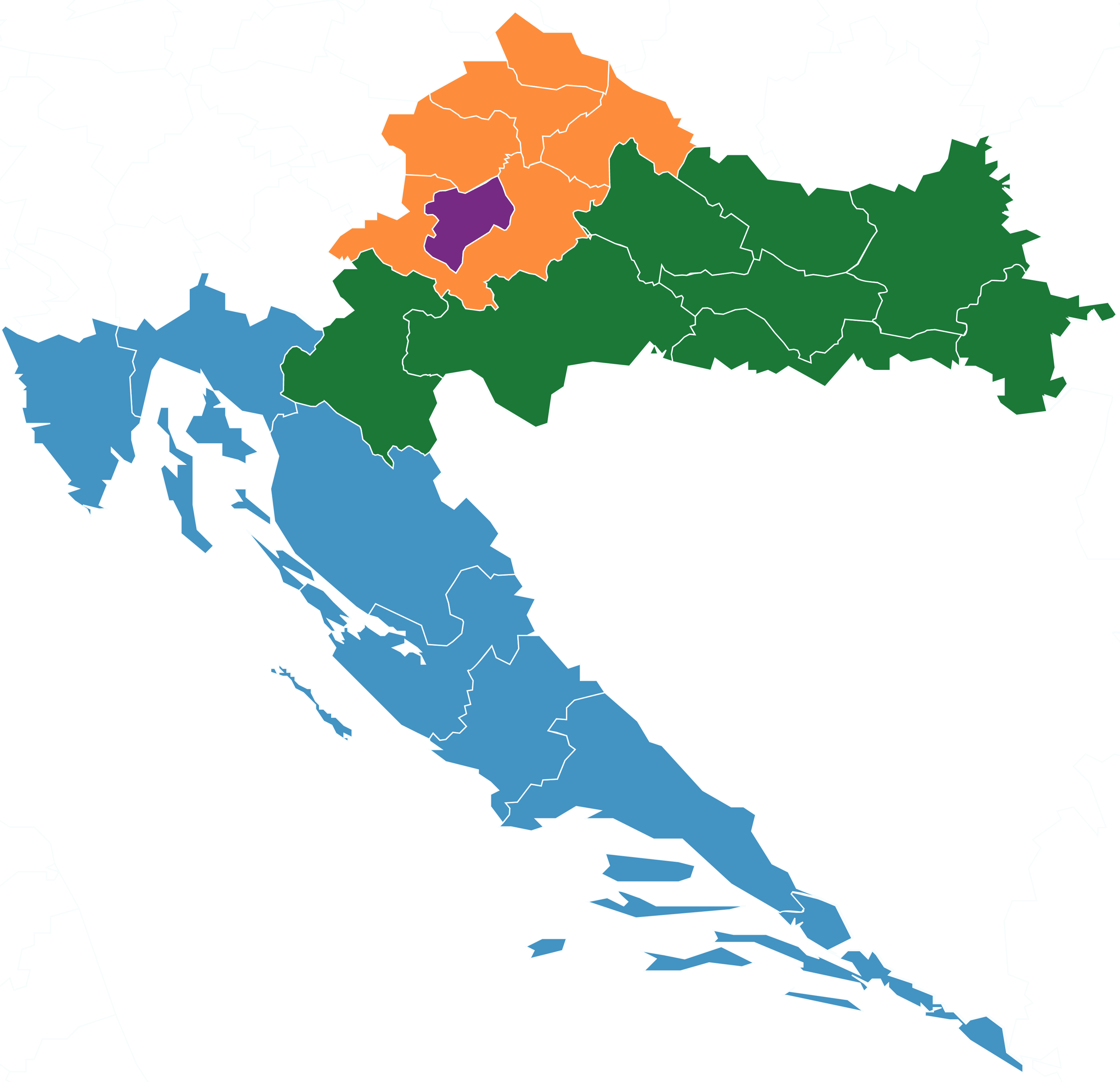
NUTS-2 of Croatia since 2021

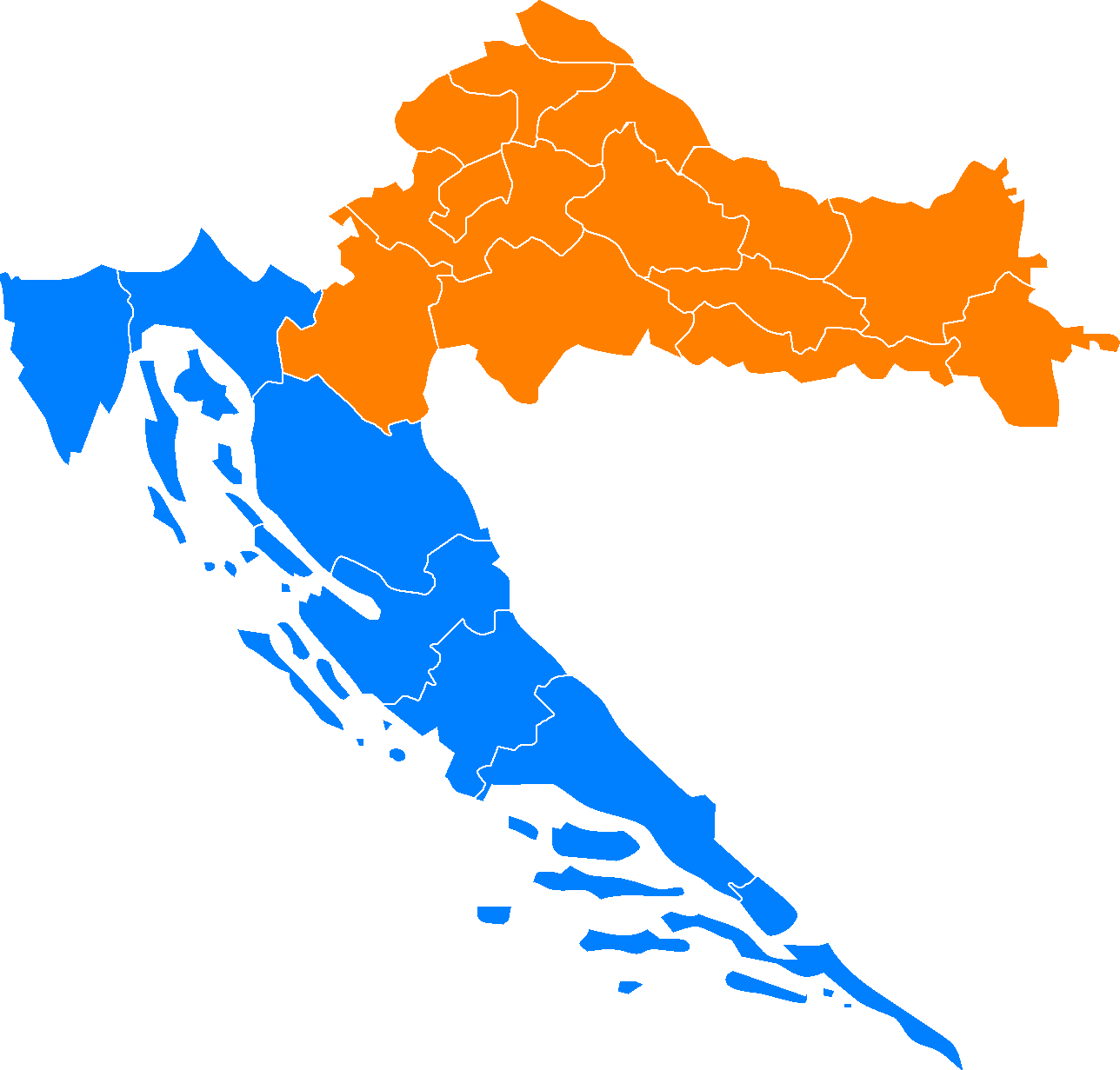
NUTS-2 of Croatia between 2012 and 2020

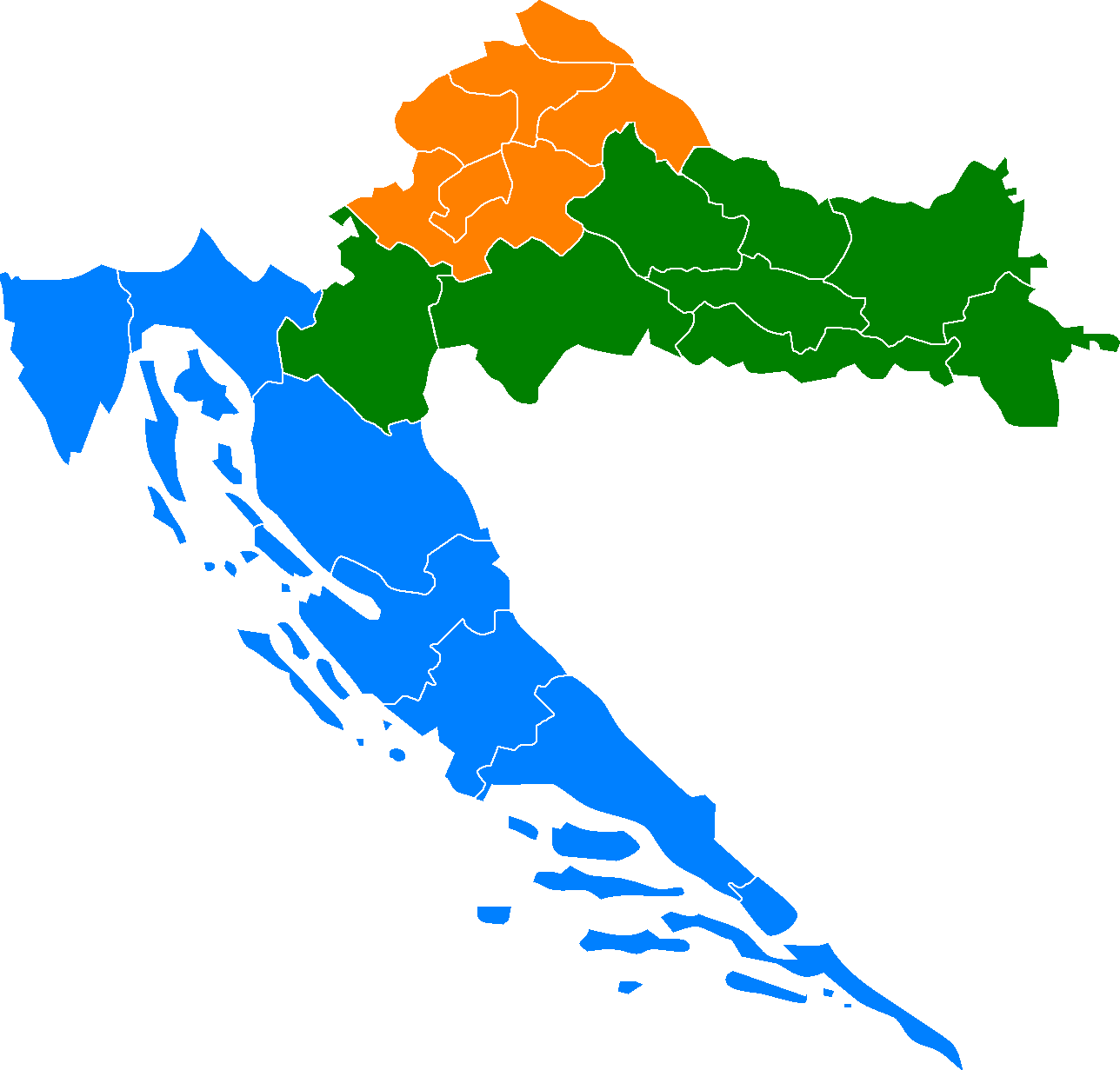
NUTS-2 of Croatia between 2007 and 2012

Croatia (HR) is included in the Nomenclature of Territorial Units for Statistics (NUTS) of the European Union. The NUTS of Croatia were defined during the Accession of Croatia to the European Union, codified by the Croatian Bureau of Statistics in early 2007. The regions were revised twice, first in 2012, and then in 2021.

The three NUTS levels are:

- NUTS-1: Croatia
- NUTS-2: 4 regions (non-administrative)
- NUTS-3: 21 counties (administrative)

The NUTS codes are as follows:

NUTS 1	Code	NUTS 2	Code	NUTS 3	Code
Croatia	HR0	Panonska Hrvatska (Pannonian Croatia)	HR02	Bjelovarsko-bilogorska županija (County of Bjelovar-Bilogora)	HR021
Croatia	HR0	Panonska Hrvatska (Pannonian Croatia)	HR02	Virovitičko-podravska županija (County of Virovitica-Podravina)	HR022
Croatia	HR0	Panonska Hrvatska (Pannonian Croatia)	HR02	Požeško-slavonska županija (County of Požega-Slavonia)	HR023
Croatia	HR0	Panonska Hrvatska (Pannonian Croatia)	HR02	Brodsko-posavska županija (County of Brod-Posavina)	HR024
Croatia	HR0	Panonska Hrvatska (Pannonian Croatia)	HR02	Osječko-baranjska županija (County of Osijek-Baranja)	HR025
Croatia	HR0	Panonska Hrvatska (Pannonian Croatia)	HR02	Vukovarsko-srijemska županija (County of Vukovar-Srijem)	HR026
Croatia	HR0	Panonska Hrvatska (Pannonian Croatia)	HR02	Karlovačka županija (County of Karlovac)	HR027
Croatia	HR0	Panonska Hrvatska (Pannonian Croatia)	HR02	Sisačko-moslavačka županija (County of Sisak-Moslavina)	HR028
Croatia	HR0	Jadranska Hrvatska (Adriatic Croatia)	HR03	Primorsko-goranska županija (County of Primorje-Gorski Kotar)	HR031
Croatia	HR0	Jadranska Hrvatska (Adriatic Croatia)	HR03	Ličko-senjska županija (County of Lika-Senj)	HR032
Croatia	HR0	Jadranska Hrvatska (Adriatic Croatia)	HR03	Zadarska županija (County of Zadar)	HR033
Croatia	HR0	Jadranska Hrvatska (Adriatic Croatia)	HR03	Šibensko-kninska županija (County of Šibenik-Knin)	HR034
Croatia	HR0	Jadranska Hrvatska (Adriatic Croatia)	HR03	Splitsko-dalmatinska županija (County of Split-Dalmatia)	HR035
Croatia	HR0	Jadranska Hrvatska (Adriatic Croatia)	HR03	Istarska županija (County of Istria)	HR036
Croatia	HR0	Jadranska Hrvatska (Adriatic Croatia)	HR03	Dubrovačko-neretvanska županija (County of Dubrovnik-Neretva)	HR037
Croatia	HR0	Grad Zagreb (City of Zagreb)	HR05	Grad Zagreb (City of Zagreb)	HR050
Croatia	HR0	Sjeverna Hrvatska (Northern Croatia)	HR06	Međimurska županija (County of Međimurje)	HR061
Croatia	HR0	Sjeverna Hrvatska (Northern Croatia)	HR06	Varaždinska županija (County of Varaždin)	HR062
Croatia	HR0	Sjeverna Hrvatska (Northern Croatia)	HR06	Koprivničko-križevačka županija (County of Koprivnica-Križevci)	HR063
Croatia	HR0	Sjeverna Hrvatska (Northern Croatia)	HR06	Krapinsko-zagorska županija (County of Krapina-Zagorje)	HR064
Croatia	HR0	Sjeverna Hrvatska (Northern Croatia)	HR06	Zagrebačka županija (County of Zagreb)	HR065

Below the NUTS levels, there is the LAU level. These are the Croatian Cities and municipalities (Gradovi i općine).

== See also ==
- Subdivisions of Croatia
- ISO 3166-2 codes of Croatia
- FIPS region codes of Croatia
