= Louis Tirlet =

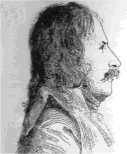
- Born: 14 March 1771; Moiremont
- Died: 29 November 1841 (aged 70); Fontaine-en-Dormois
- Military career
- Allegiance: First French Empire, Kingdom of France
- Rank: général de division

Louis Tirlet (French: [lwi tiʁlɛ]; 14 March 1771, Moiremont – 29 November 1841, Fontaine-en-Dormois) was a French général de division and artillery specialist during the Napoleonic Wars. His name appears in the 21st column of the Arc de Triomphe.

== Career ==
In the War of the Fifth Coalition, General of Brigade Tirlet held the position of chief of artillery in Auguste Marmont's XI Corps during the Dalmatian Campaign. At the Battle of Wagram, Emperor Napoleon I of France detached Tirlet from XI Corps to command 129 artillery pieces on the island of Lobau. On the second day of battle, Johann von Klenau's Austrians defeated the weak French left flank and approached Lobau. The Austrians were kept at a distance by a tremendous artillery barrage.

The year 1810 found Tirlet commanding the II Corps artillery under Jean Reynier during André Masséna's invasion of Portugal in the Peninsular War. He fought at the Battle of Bussaco, before the Lines of Torres Vedras, and at the Battle of Sabugal. Tirlet also served as Marmont's chief of artillery at the Battle of Salamanca in July 1812.

== Honours ==
- Knight Grand Cross in the Legion of Honour.
