= Andreas von Stoichevich =

Austrian general (1737–1814)

- Andrija Stojčević
- Born: 1753; Neštin, Habsburg monarchy
- Died: 1810 (aged 56–57); Gospić, Illyrian Provinces
- Military career
- Allegiance: Habsburg Monarchy; Austrian Empire
- Branch: Army
- Service years: 1770–1810
- Rank: Feldmarschalleutnant
- Conflicts: Dalmatian campaign of 1809

Andreas Stoichevich (Croatian: Andrija Stojčević; 1753 - 6 October 1810) was an Austrian nobleman and general who fought in the Napoleonic Wars particularly in the Dalmatian Campaign where Napoleon's favorite general Marmont was caught off-guard. Stoichevich also led his regiment in four or five more battles, namely Sacile, Caldiero, Tarvis and Graz before retirement.

== Biography ==
Stoichevich was born in 1753 in Neštin, a Vojvodina village which was at the time part of the Kingdom of Slavonia.

In 1770, he joined the Petrovaradin Krajina Infantry Regiment no. 9 as a cadet. He rose to the rank of a company leader (Oberleutnant) in 1778 and captain (Hauptmann) in 1788, and was then reassigned to the Slavonian Border Guard Volunteer Corps, where he became a major in 1790.

In 1793 Stoichevich commanded the first combined Slavonian battalion, raised in June 1792 from two companies each of the Brod, Gradiška and Petrovaradin regiments of the Slavonian Generalat of the Military Frontier. At the time they saw battle in the War of the First Coalition.

In 1797, he rose to the rank of battalion commander (Oberstleutnant) and commanded the 1st Border Guard Rifle Battalion on the Rhine, and also saw combat in Switzerland and Tyrol. In 1799, he became a colonel (Oberst), and given command of the Petrovaradin Krajina Infantry Regiment no. 9, headquartered in Mitrovica.

On 18 February 1804 he was promoted to brigadier general and on 1 September 1805 became a major general.

In the War of the Fifth Coalition in 1809, Stoichevich fought under the divisional commander Baron Vinko Knežević when the corps structure underwent a change with Stoichevich being ordered by Archduke John to detach to fight against Auguste de Marmont in the Dalmatian Campaign. That was right after the mid-April Battle of Sacile and the late-April Battle of Caldiero that he mustered his regiment without respite and went into battle again. It was in the May 1809 Battle of Tarvis that he played a crucial role in ousting Napoleon's French Army and the General of the Division Marmont, though it cost him a victory. He was then put in charge of a brigade in Gospić.

At the height of the Marmont May campaign in Dalmatia, Stoichevich's headquarters near the upper course of the Zrmanja was overrun by the French cavalry, with himself and his adjutant Leutnant Budisavljević taken prisoner, and losses of around 200 killed, 500 wounded and 300 captured soldiers.

On 25 September 1809, Stoichevich was promoted to Feldmarschalleutnant. He retired in 1810, and died the same year in Gospić.
