= Dalmatian campaign of 1809 =

1809 campaign of the War of the Fifth Coalition

- Part of the War of the Fifth Coalition
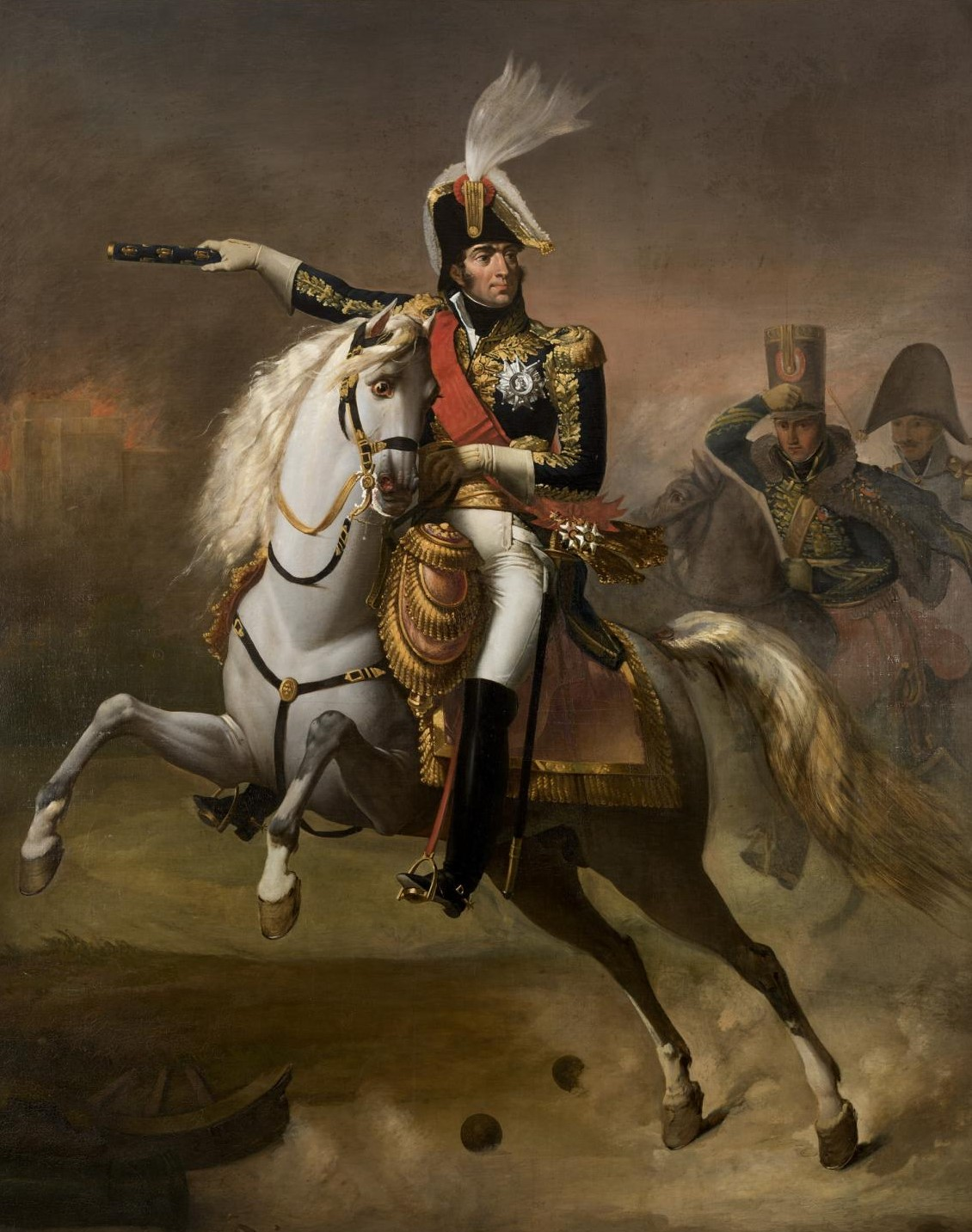
- An equestrian portrait of Auguste Marmont
Date	26 April – 21 May 1809 Full dates: 26–30 April – Combat of Zrmanja River; 16 May – Combat of Pribudić; 17 May – Combat of Gračac; 21 May – Combat of Gospić
Location	Dalmatia, Croatia 44.04°N 16.19°E
Result	French victory Full results: Austrian victory – Combat of Zrmanja River; French victory – Combat of Pribudić; French victory – Combat of Gračac; Disputed – Combat of Gospić

Belligerents
(France) First French Empire	Austrian Empire

Commanders and leaders
(France) Auguste Marmont	(Austrian Empire) Andreas Stoichevich (POW at Pribudić) (Austrian Empire) Matthias Rebrovich

Strength
14,000	8,100–9,000

Casualties and losses
Zrmanja River: 1,200; Pribudić: light Gračac: 300; Gospić: 1,004	Zrmanja River: 250; Pribudić: 1,000; Gračac: 300; Gospić: 764, 2–5 guns

War of the Fifth Coalition:
Dalmatian Campaign

The Dalmatian campaign of 1809 saw several battles fought between 30 April and 21 May 1809 by Auguste Marmont's First French Empire soldiers and Andreas von Stoichevich's Austrian Empire troops. The Austrians drove the French from their positions on the Zrmanja River at the end of April. But in mid-May, the French counterattack forced back the Austrians. The defenders offered stout resistance, but ultimately Marmont broke out of Dalmatia and joined Emperor Napoleon's army near Vienna with over 10,000 men. The campaign was fought during the War of the Fifth Coalition, part of the Napoleonic Wars. Dalmatia is part of the modern-day nation of Croatia.

Marmont, Napoleon's friend, was entrusted with the "finest" troops for this theater, and they were also well supplied with artillery. At the beginning of the conflict, the Austrians thrust across the Zrmanja and forced the French back to the fortified cities. After the Austrian defeat and subsequent retreat from Italy of the army of Archduke John of Austria, Marmont launched his own offensive. The French beat the Austrians at Pribudić near Knin, capturing Stoichevich, and moved north. Two more actions were fought at Gračac on 17 May and Gospić on 21 May before Marmont reached Ljubljana (Laibach) in Carniola.

Continuing north, the French general fought in the Battle of Graz on 25 and 26 June and in the decisive Battle of Wagram on 5 and 6 July. Meanwhile, the Austrians made a second, more successful incursion in Dalmatia. At the turn of August, an armistice was signed, but by October the Treaty of Schönbrunn was signed, which led to them relinquishing these gains to France after all.

== Background ==
At the end of the War of the Third Coalition on 26 December 1805, the Treaty of Pressburg awarded the former Austrian provinces of Istria and Dalmatia to the French puppet Kingdom of Italy. Since that time, Marmont had administered the region.

The Dalmatian population at the time was more favorable towards Austrian rule because of French mobilization, war loans, and the perception of being adversarial towards the Catholic Church.

On the outbreak of war in April 1809, the major forces in the Italian theater were the Franco-Italian army of the Viceroy of Italy, Eugène de Beauharnais and the Austrian army of General der Kavallerie Archduke John of Austria. In addition, General of Division Marmont commanded a French corps in occupation of Dalmatia. Because Marmont's troops had trained with the Grande Armée at the Camp de Boulogne (as the old II Corps) and missed the bloody battles of the War of the Fourth Coalition, Napoleon considered the unit his "finest corps".

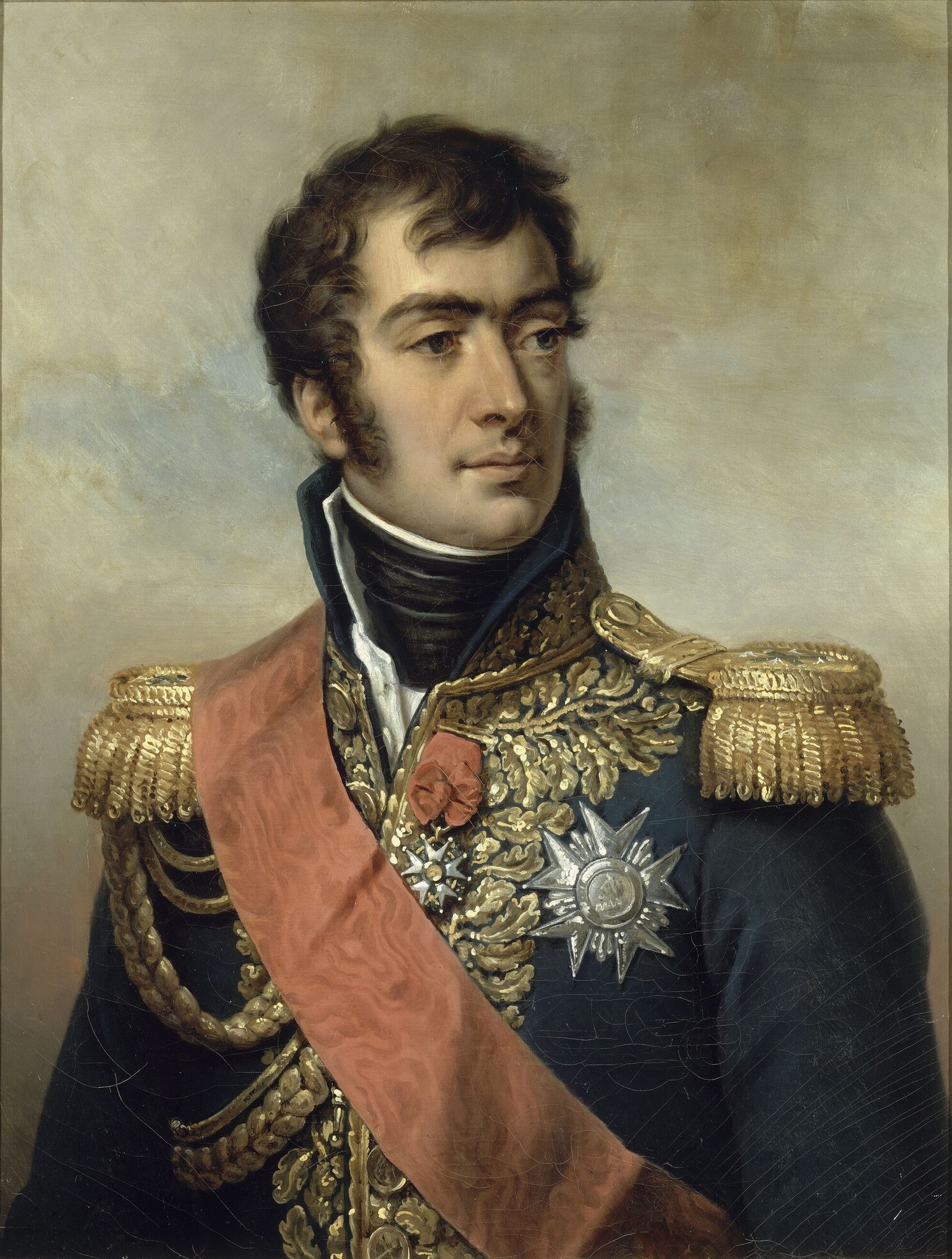
Auguste Marmont

Marmont's so-called Army of Dalmatia consisted of two infantry divisions commanded by Generals of Division Joseph Hélie Désiré Perruquet de Montrichard and Bertrand Clausel. Montrichand's 1st Division consisted of the brigades of Colonel Jean Louis Soye and General of Brigade Jean Marie Auguste Aulnay de Launay, plus the 9th company of the 2nd Foot Artillery Regiment, with six 6-pound cannons. Soye's brigade included the 18th Light and 5th Line Infantry Regiments. De Launay's brigade was made up of the 79th and 81st Line Infantry Regiments. Clausel's 2nd Division comprised the brigades of Generals of Brigade Alexis Joseph Delzons and Gilbert Bachelu. The divisional artillery included the 3rd and 9th companies of the 8th Foot Artillery Regiment, with six 6-pound cannons and two 5-inch howitzers in each company for a total of 16 guns. Delzons led the 8th Light and 23rd Line Infantry Regiments and Bachelu directed the 11th Line Infantry Regiment. The 11th Line had three battalions, while the other regiments only had two battalions each. Average battalion strength was approximately 700.

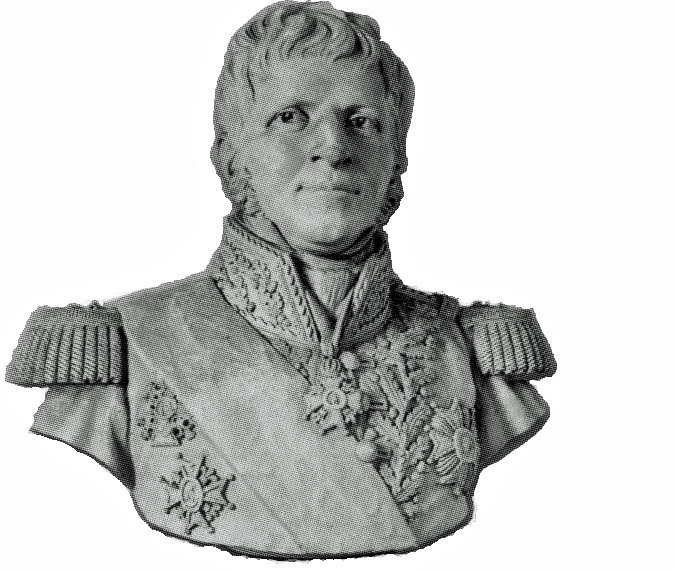
Louis Tirlet

The Army of Dalmatia was provided with an especially powerful artillery contingent of 78 guns led by General of Brigade Louis Tirlet. The name is misspelled "Tiblet" both times. The large corps artillery reserve included the 7th, 8th, 9th, 14th, and 15th companies of the 1st Italian Artillery Regiment, six 6-pound cannons each. The 10th company of the 7th Foot Artillery Regiment had six 12-pound cannons and the 2nd company of the 2nd Foot Artillery Regiment had six 12-pound cannons and two 5-inch howitzers. The 14th and 15th companies of the 2nd Foot Artillery Regiment each consisted of six 6-pound cannons. The 3rd squadron of the 24th Chasseurs à Cheval Regiment completed the corps. Marmont's chief of staff was General of Brigade Jacques-Antoine-Adrien Delort.

To oppose Marmont, Archduke John detached General-Major Stoichevich's brigade from its original place in Feldmarschallleutnant Vinzenz Knesevich von Szent-Helena's 3rd Division of Feldmarschallleutnant Ignaz Gyulai's IX Armeekorps. On 15 May, Stoichevich commanded about 8,100 troops, including roughly 7,740 infantry, 120 cavalry, and 240 artillerists. The Austrian regular infantry consisted of two battalions each of the Liccaner Grenz Infantry Regiment Nr. 1, two battalions of the Warasdiner Szent-George Grenz Infantry Regiment Nr. 6, one battalion of the 1st Deutsch Banat Grenz Infantry Regiment Nr. 12, and the 4th Garrison Battalion. Other troops included one squadron of the Hohenzollern Chevau-léger Regiment, four battalions of the Karlstadt Landwehr, a 3-pound Grenz brigade battery of eight cannons, and a 6-pound position battery of six guns.

An alternate order of battle for the Austrians lists three battalions of the Liccaner Grenz Infantry Regiment Nr. 1, one battalion of the Ottocaner Grenz Infantry Regiment Nr. 2, one battalion of the Oguliner Grenz Infantry Regiment Nr. 3, one battalion of the Szluiner Grenz Infantry Regiment Nr. 4, two battalions of the 1st Banal Grenz Infantry Regiment Nr. 10, one squadron of the Hohenzollern Chevau-léger Regiment, one squadron of the Serezaner cavalry, one position battery of six guns, and one brigade battery of 12 3-pound cannons.

== Spring campaign ==
=== Combat of Zrmanja River ===
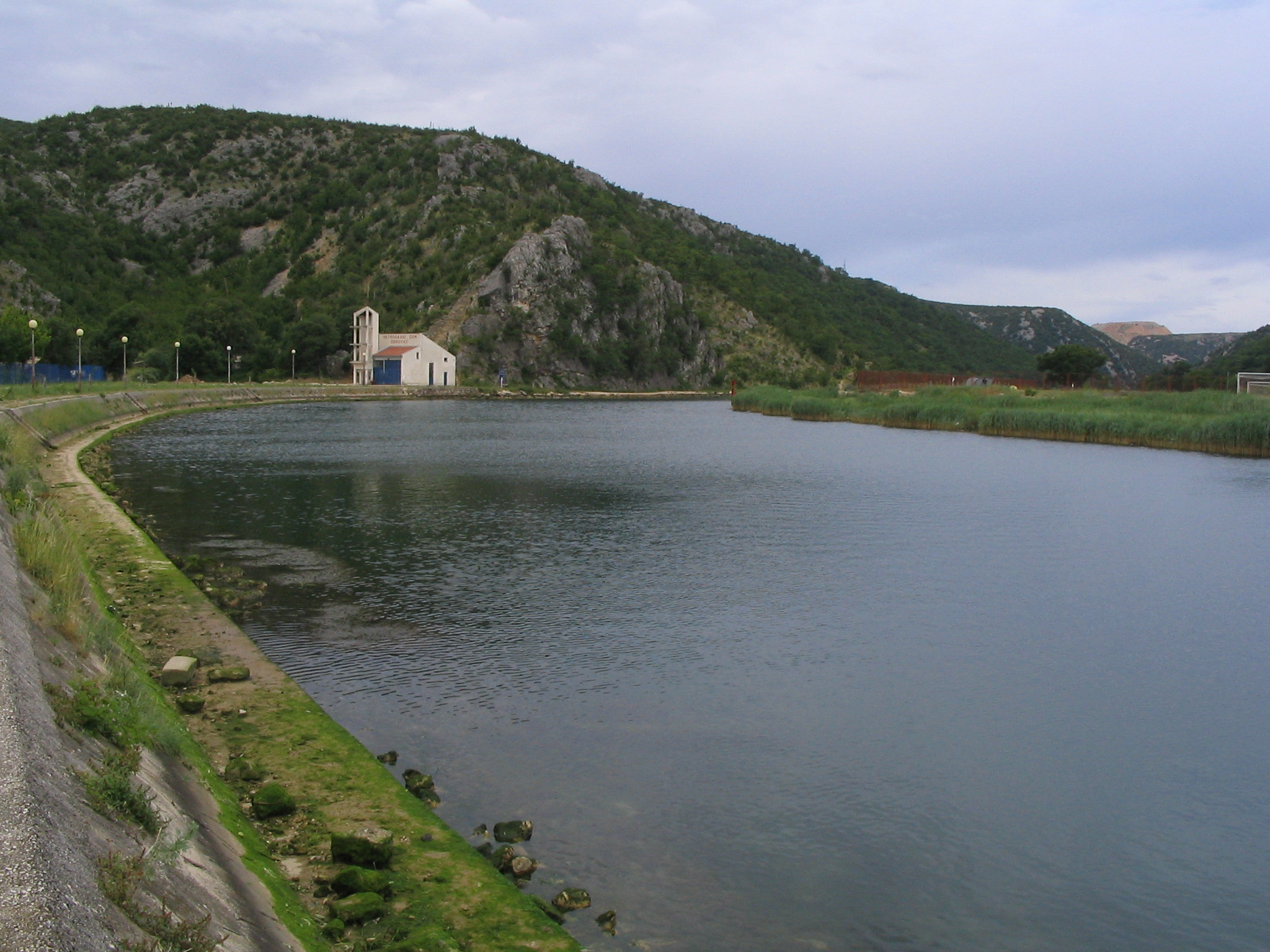
Zrmanja River at Obrovac

Though outnumbered by their adversaries, the Austrians won the opening round of the campaign. Between 26 and 30 April, General Stoichevich mounted a series of attacks on the Zrmanja River crossings of Ervenik, Kaštel Žegarski, Obrovac, Vagic, and Kravli Most. Fighting in a rainstorm, the Austrian grenzers drove the French from a mountaintop position on 30 April. During the retreat, the civilian population joined in harassing the French. The widely dispersed French forces were driven back to Knin (Kürn) and Zadar (Zara). Petre stated that Marmont retreated to Zara, while Stoichevich took a position at Kürn. Geography suggests that Bowden and Tarbox were correct in that Marmont held Kürn. For a loss of 250 casualties, Stoichevich inflicted losses of 1,000 dead and wounded on the French, while capturing 200 enemy soldiers.

For two weeks the front line stabilized, with the Austrians unable to capture Knin. Meanwhile, Bosnian and Ottoman Turk irregulars began attacking the Austrians. Hearing of the defeat of Archduke John at the Battle of Piave River on 8 May and the French eastward advance toward Laibach, Stoichevich prepared to withdraw.

On 15 May, Hauptmann (captain) Hrabovszky led 150 men from the Szluiner Grenz Infantry Regiment Nr. 4 and the Dalmatian Freikorps in a highly successful night raid against Delzons' brigade. For negligible losses, the Austrians claimed to have killed 100 Frenchmen in an attack on the village of Stara Straza, 6 kilometres (3.7 mi) northwest of Knin. In addition, they captured 200 enemy soldiers, 700 sheep, and 34 oxen.

=== Combat of Pribudić ===
On 16 May, Marmont inflicted a sharp defeat on the Austrians at Pribudić, which is 14 kilometres (9 mi) northwest of Knin. (Note: Distance and direction were obtained from Google Earth.) While a holding force of French skirmishers and artillery probed at a well-defended mountaintop position, Marmont sent the 23rd Line to strike the Austrian flank. The attack succeeded in overrunning the Austrian defenses. Of 13,000 soldiers on the field, the French suffered few casualties. Out of 9,000 men, the Austrians suffered losses of 200 dead, 500 wounded, and between 300 and 600 captured, including Stoichevich. Two sources located the battle at Pribudić, while a third associated the battle with both Mount Kita, south of Gračac, and Golubić, north of Knin.

The next day, the two sides clashed at Gračac. In this action, Marmont admitted losing 300 dead, without reporting other losses. The Austrians, now commanded by Oberst (colonel) Matthias Rebrovich, reported losing 300 killed and wounded before retreating toward Gospić. Gračac is about 45 kilometres (28 mi) northwest of Knin. (Note: This was measured on Google Earth.)

=== Combat of Gospić ===
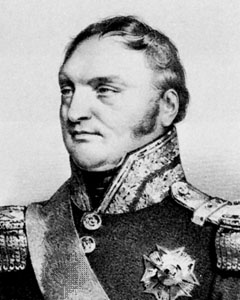
Bertrand Clausel led Marmont's 2nd Division

On 21 May, Marmont located Rebrovich's forces deployed behind the Lika River near Gospić. Holding back one of his divisions as a reserve, he sent the other into a trans-riverine attack. To open the action, the French voltiguer (light infantry) companies waded across the river at a ford under fire. Taking possession of the bluffs on the far side, they fought off repeated Austrian assaults. The French fed reinforcements into a bridgehead that was commanded by 12 Austrian guns. To counter the enemy's local superiority in artillery, the French formed in a single line with three-pace gaps between men. The skirmish line was backed by groups of ten men, each led by an officer. Mule-carried mountain howitzers were brought up to provide fire support.

Noting that the Austrians fought in three disconnected forces, Marmont hurled his main blow at Rebrovich's center. Although one battalion of the 81st Line suffered heavy losses from the Austrian bombardment, the French began to prevail. An attack by the 18th Light stormed the enemy battery, capturing five cannons. As the Austrian center retreated hastily, Marmont turned against the enemy wings and threw them back also.

The French lost 134 dead, 600 wounded, and 270 captured out of the 11,000 men engaged in this tough fight. Both Soye and de Launay were wounded. The Austrians admitted losing 64 dead, 500 wounded, 200 captured, and two guns. Historian Digby Smith called the action an Austrian victory, though this appears to contradict the narrative of James R. Arnold, which strongly implied a French triumph.

== Marmont's northward push ==
Historian Francis Loraine Petre suggested that only "remnants" of Matthias Rebrovich's command joined with Ignaz Gyulai near Zagreb (Agram) at the beginning of June 1809. Robert M. Epstein stated that Andreas von Stoichevich's command was badly mauled in the campaign. After taking Gospić, Marmont continued northward and reached Trieste on 28 May and Ljubljana (Laibach) on 3 June.

On 26 June, Marmont's corps intervened in the Battle of Graz, joining with General of Division Jean-Baptiste Broussier to drive Gyulai's men to the east. After pursuing the Austrians for two days, he received orders on the 29th to proceed to Vienna at once by forced marches. Despite the victory, Napoleon remarked to Eugene, "Marmont has manoeuvred badly enough; Broussier still worse." He believed that Marmont should have been at Graz by 23 or 24 June. Not only Marmont, but Broussier, Eugene and other outlying elements of the French emperor's armies were called upon to march to Vienna. The climactic Battle of Wagram was fought on 5 and 6 July 1809. By the time of Wagram, Marmont's Army of Dalmatia was renamed the XI Corps.

After Wagram, Napoleon cross-examined Marmont about the Dalmatian campaign. He then criticized the general's actions for two hours. Wrung out by the experience, Marmont returned to his tent. To his surprise, he later found that he had been nominated for promotion to Marshal of France. But Napoleon also sent him a letter noting that, "Between ourselves, you have not yet done enough to justify entirely my choice." Three men became marshal after Wagram. Of the three, the soldiers composed a ditty,

MacDonald is France's choice
Oudinot is the army's choice
Marmont is friendship's choice.

== Summer campaign ==
In July 1809, there was another attack on French positions in Dalmatia under the command of general Petar Knežević, which was far more successful than the spring one. By the end of that month, Austrians controlled all of Dalmatia except Zadar and the fortresses of Knin, Klis and the St. Nicholas Fortress near Šibenik. A joint Austrian-British naval expedition blockaded Zadar, until an armistice was agreed on 28 July, and formally proclaimed on 3 August. On 2 August, supported by local rebels, Austrian forces marched into Split.

News of the 14 October Treaty of Schönbrunn reached Zadar on 24 October, and the handover of the region back to the French proceeded in November.

== See also ==
- Adriatic campaign of 1807-1814 describes British and French naval operations.
- Battle of Feistritz (1813), where Rebrovich was in command during the War of the Sixth Coalition

== External sources ==
- The following two items are excellent sources for the full names of Austrian and French generals.
- napoleon-series.org Austrian Generals 1792-1815 by Digby Smith, compiled by Leopold Kudrna
- Broughton, Tony. napoleon-series.org Generals Who Served in the French Army during the Period 1789-1815

Preceded by Battle of Neumarkt-Sankt Veit	Napoleonic Wars; Dalmatian Campaign (1809)	Succeeded by Battle of Ebelsberg
