= Battle of Tarvis (1809) =

1809 battle during the War of the Fifth Coalition

- Part of the War of the Fifth Coalition
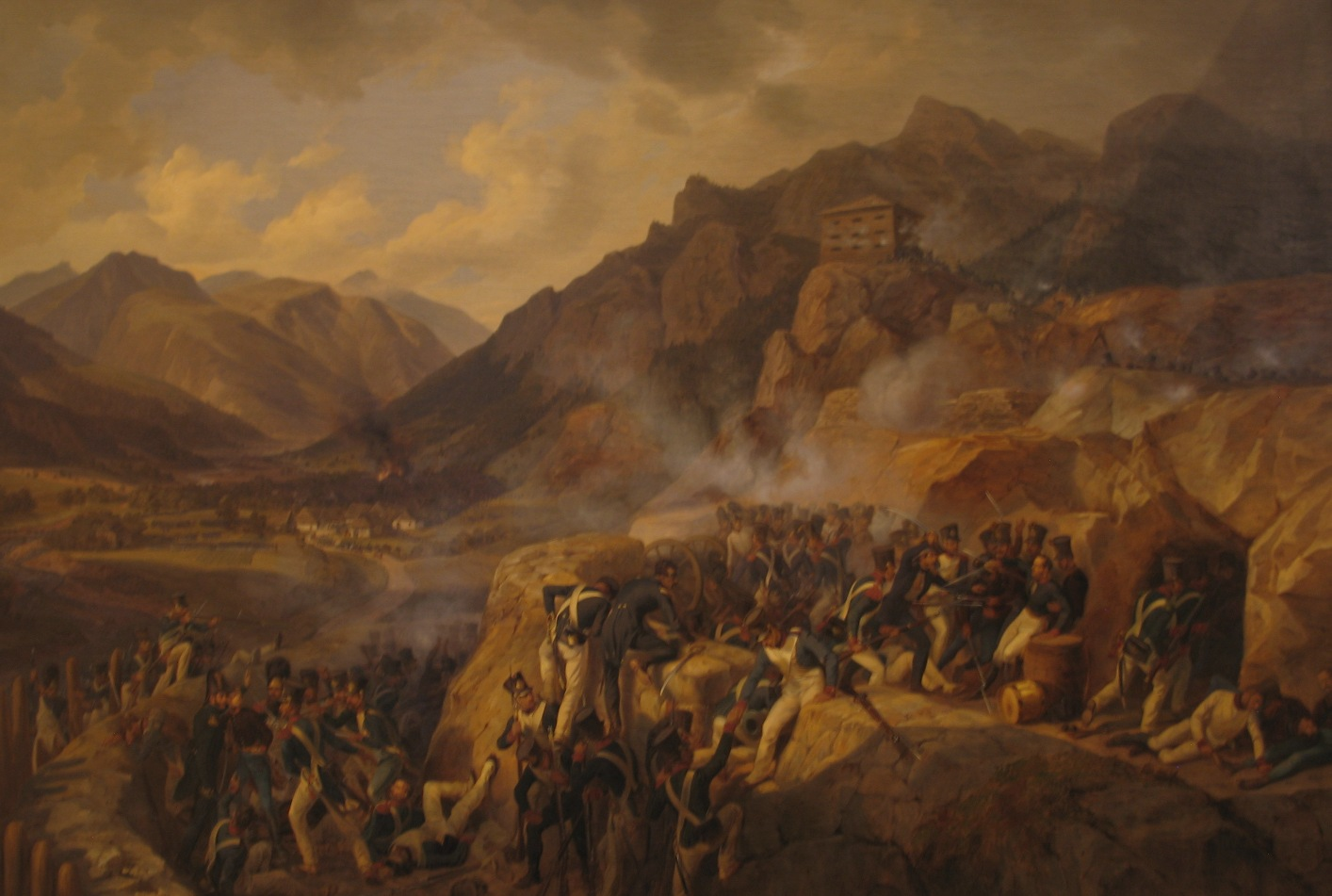
- Storming of Malborghetto Fort by Albrecht Adam (1786–1862)
Date	15 May to 18 May 1809
Location	Tarvisio, modern-day Italy 46°30′18″N 13°34′42″E
Result	Franco-Italian victory

Belligerents
First French Empire (Kingdom of Italy (Napoleonic)) Kingdom of Italy	Austrian Empire

Commanders and leaders
(Kingdom of Italy (Napoleonic)) Eugène de Beauharnais	(Austrian Empire) Albert Gyulai

Strength
Tarvis: 25,000; Predil: 8,500, 12 guns Malborghetto: 15,000; Total: 38,500 men	Tarvis: 6,000, 10 guns Predil: 250, 8 guns Malborghetto: 650, 10 guns Total: 6,900 men, 28 guns

Casualties and losses
Tarvis: 380; Predil: 450; Malborghetto: over 80; Total: Over 1,010 men	Tarvis: 1,789, 6 guns Predil: 250, 8 guns Malborghetto: 650, 10 guns Total: 2,689 men, 24 guns

War of the Fifth Coalition
current battle
Napoleon in command
Napoleon not in command

The Battle of Tarvis from 16 to 17 May 1809, the Storming of the Malborghetto Blockhouse from 15 to 17 May 1809, and the Storming of the Predil Blockhouse from 15 to 18 May saw the Franco-Italian army of Eugène de Beauharnais attacking Austrian Empire forces under Albert Gyulai. Eugène defeated Gyulai's division in a battle near Tarvisio, then an Austrian town known as Tarvis. At nearby Malborghetto Valbruna and Predil Pass, small garrisons of Grenz infantry defended two forts before being overwhelmed. The Franco-Italian capture of the key mountain passes allowed their forces to invade Austrian Kärnten during the War of the Fifth Coalition. Tarvisio is located in far northeast Italy, near the borders of both Austria and Slovenia.

Eugène's main column marched up the Fella River valley, which runs east and west in the area of the fighting. On 15 May the column found itself blocked by the Malborghetto fort. Attacking with a superior force, Eugène's troops captured the fort on the morning of the 17th. Later that day, the Franco-Italians routed Gyulai's division from its positions near Tarvisio (Tarvis), inflicting heavy losses. A second Franco-Italian column, attempting to join Eugène from the south, was halted on the 15th by the Predil fort. On 18 May, Predil fell to assault and the defenders were killed to the last man. Monuments at both forts honor the Austrians who died in the fighting.

== Background ==
=== Early battles ===
The Austrian war plan at the start of the War of the Fifth Coalition called for the Army of Inner Austria under General der Kavallerie Archduke John of Austria to invade and seize the province of Venetia in northeast Italy. For this formidable task, John's forces were not especially large.

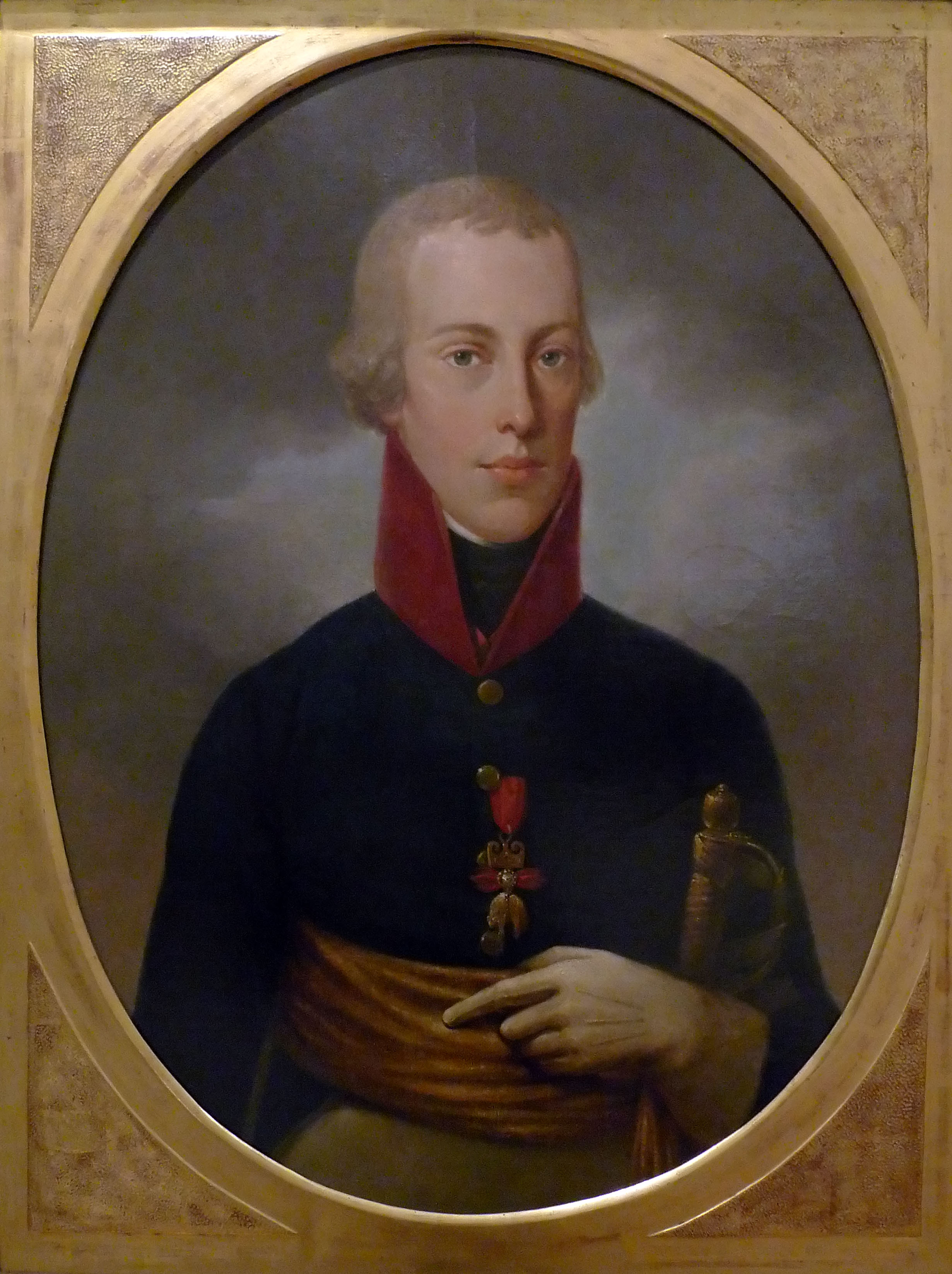
Archduke John

The VIII Armeekorps numbered 24,500 infantry, 2,600 cavalry, and 62 guns. The IX Armeekorps counted 22,200 infantry, 2,000 cavalry, and 86 guns. General-Major Andreas von Stoichevich was poised to advance south into French-occupied Dalmatia with 10,000 more. This source provides the number of guns only. Assembling in Carinthia were 23,500 second-line soldiers in 33 Landwehr battalions, with 6,600 more Landwehr troops in reserve. To support the Tyrolean Rebellion, John reorganized his army and sent Feldmarschall-Leutnant Johann Gabriel Chasteler de Courcelles west with 10,000 troops from VIII Armeekorps. The detachment left John with about 40,000 soldiers for his invasion of Italy out of 85,000 available. The departure of Chasteler left Feldmarschall-Leutnant Albert Gyulai in command of VIII Armeekorps and his brother Feldmarschall-Leutnant Ignaz Gyulai in charge of IX Armeekorps.

Eugène commanded 70,000 Franco-Italian troops in his Army of Italy. Of his six French and three Italian infantry divisions, only two defended the Soča (Isonzo) River near the eastern frontier, while the rest were scattered across the Kingdom of Italy. On 16 April 1809, an overconfident Eugène gave battle with only one cavalry and five infantry divisions, about 35,000 infantry and 2,000 cavalry. At the Battle of Sacile, John's invading army mauled Eugène's army, inflicting 6,500 casualties for a loss of only 3,600. The defeated Army of Italy fell back to Verona on the Adige River gathering reinforcements until it had accumulated 60,000 soldiers. After John detached forces to besiege the Osoppo and Palmanova fortresses, and to watch the large French garrison of Venice, the Austrian army arrived before Verona with only 30,000 troops on 28 April. After hearing of the main Austrian army's defeat at the Battle of Eckmühl on 22 April, Emperor Francis I of Austria ordered his brother Archduke John to retreat to Inner Austria.

After fencing with the Viceroy near Soave and Monte Bastia at the Battle of Caldiero at the end of April, the archduke withdrew on 2 May. The retreat was covered by Feldmarschall-Leutnant Johann Maria Philipp Frimont's rear guard. On 8 May, John defended a strong position behind the Piave River. In the Battle of Piave River, Eugène defeated his opponent, inflicting 5,000 casualties while suffering about 2,000 killed and wounded. On 11 May, the Franco-Italian advance guard turned both flanks of Frimont's 4,000-man rear guard at San Daniele del Friuli. The Austrians were crushed with losses of about 2,000, while French casualties numbered between 200 and 800. After a clash at Venzone, Frimont retreated north up the Fella River valley, burning the bridges behind him.

=== Preliminaries ===
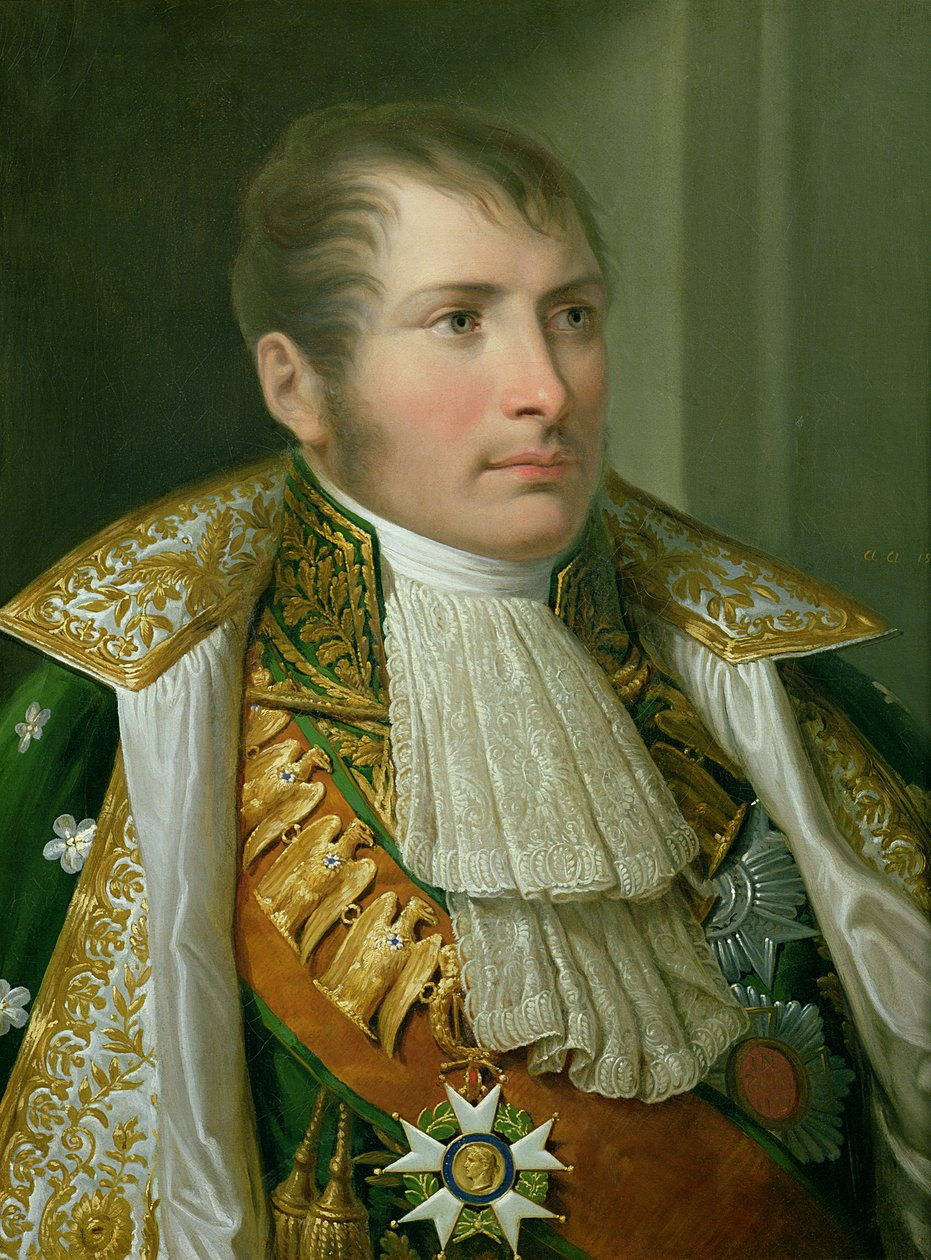
Eugène de Beauharnais

Archduke John took about 19,000 troops back to Tarvis. He sent Ignaz Gyulai and 5,000 soldiers to Carniola (Slovenia) which was only guarded by two brigades under Feldmarschall-Leutnant Anton von Zach and General-Major Johann Kalnássy. Epstein wrote Carinthia instead of the correct Carniola. In his capacity as Ban of Croatia, Ignaz Gyulai had the authority to muster the Croatian insurrectio or militia. Seriously weakened by his abortive invasion of Italy, John recalled Chasteler from the Tyrol in the hope of massing enough troops to challenge Eugène.

Eugène planned to pierce the barrier of the Carnic Alps by advancing in multiple columns. To the west, he directed General of Division Jean-Baptiste Dominique Rusca and his division to march up the valley of the Piave, then turn east. He ordered General of Division Jacques MacDonald with one cavalry and two infantry divisions, 14,000 troops, to march due east and seize the Austrian base at Ljubljana (Laibach) in Carniola. From there, MacDonald might link up with General of Division Auguste Marmont advancing north from Dalmatia, or he could capture Graz or Maribor (Marburg an der Drau). Eugène sent one division under General of Division Jean-Mathieu Seras moving north up the Soča (Isonzo) toward Tarvis via the Predil Pass. He took the bulk of his army north from Osoppo along the Fella valley, aiming for the Austrian bases at Tarvis and Villach. This 25,000-strong force included the corps of Generals of Division Paul Grenier and Louis Baraguey d'Hilliers, the Italian Royal Guard, and two cavalry divisions.

As his brigade retreated up the upper Piave valley, General-Major Josef Schmidt thoroughly obstructed the road in front of Rusca. Unable to move his wagons and artillery in that direction, Rusca backtracked and followed in Eugène's path. The main column also faced a route littered with broken bridges. Eugène finally sent his artillery, cavalry, and trains back and directed them to follow in Seras' track. He continued to advance to Pontebba (Pontafel) with his infantry and some light guns.

=== Personalities ===
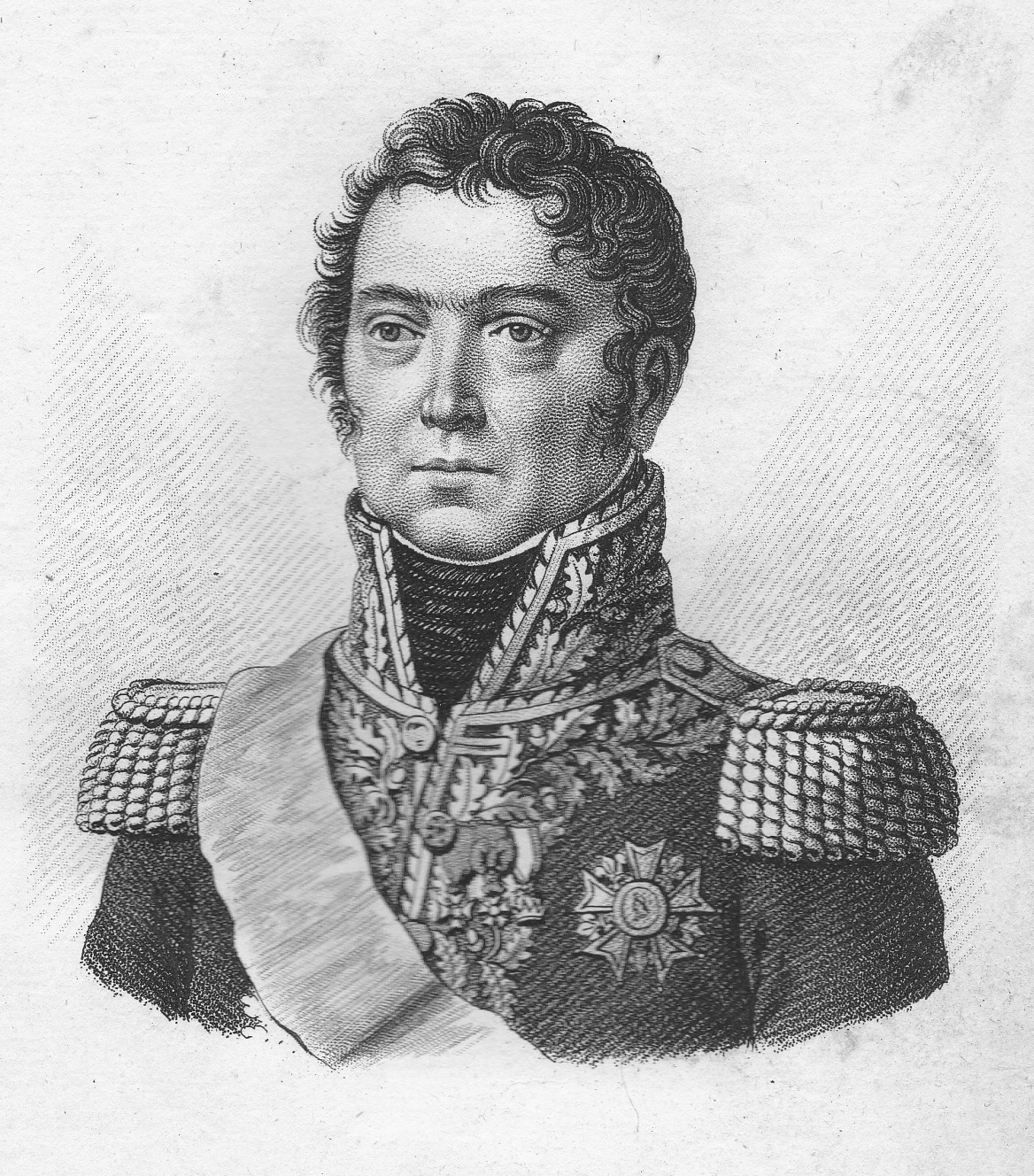
Paul Grenier

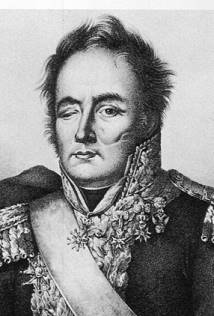
Pierre Durutte

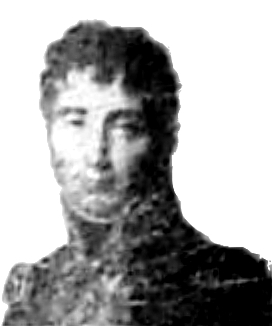
Joseph Dessaix

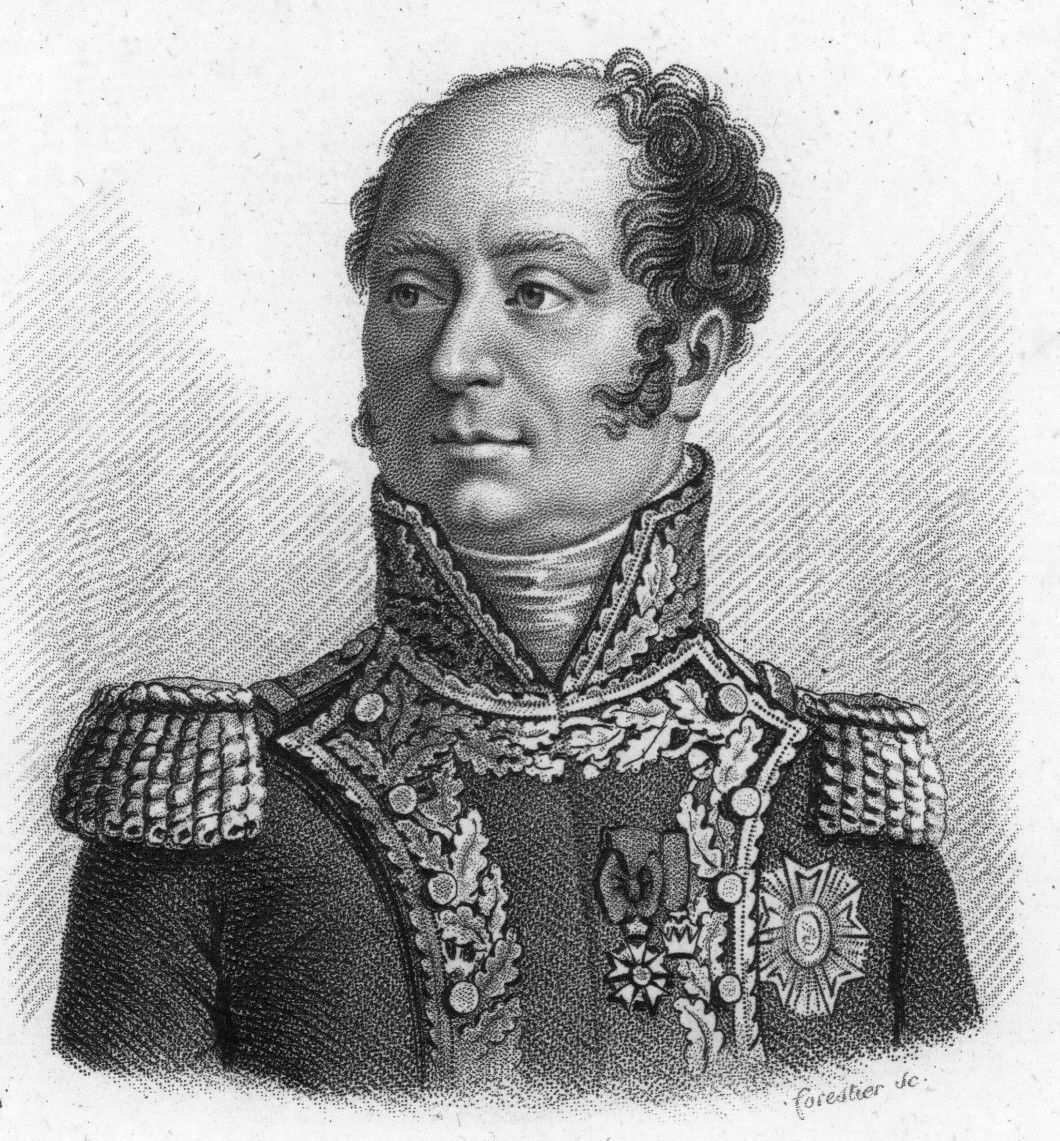
Louis d'Hilliers

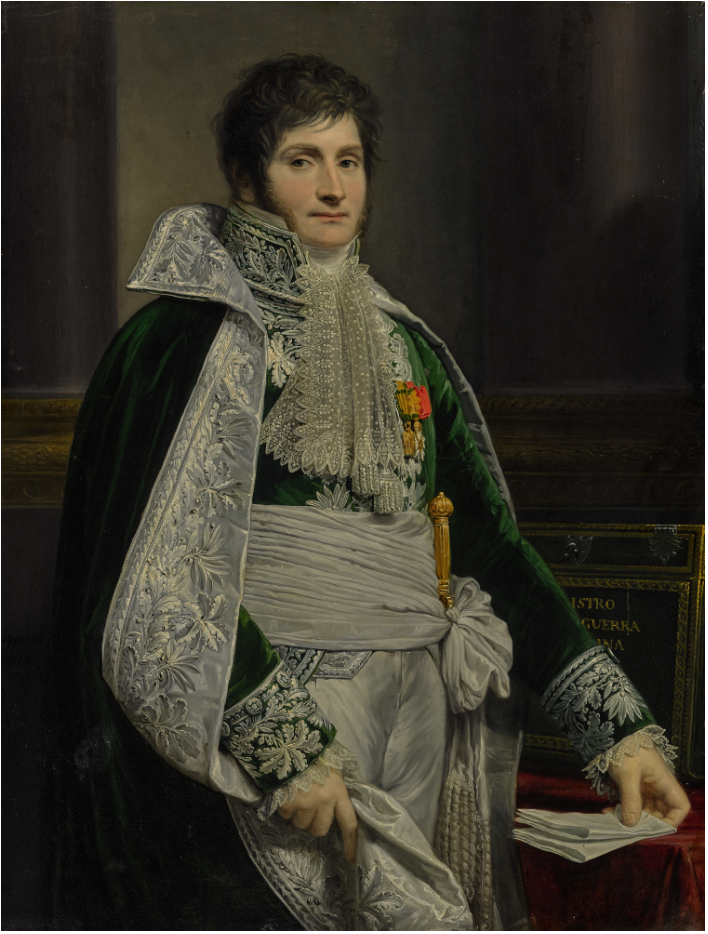
Achille Fontanelli

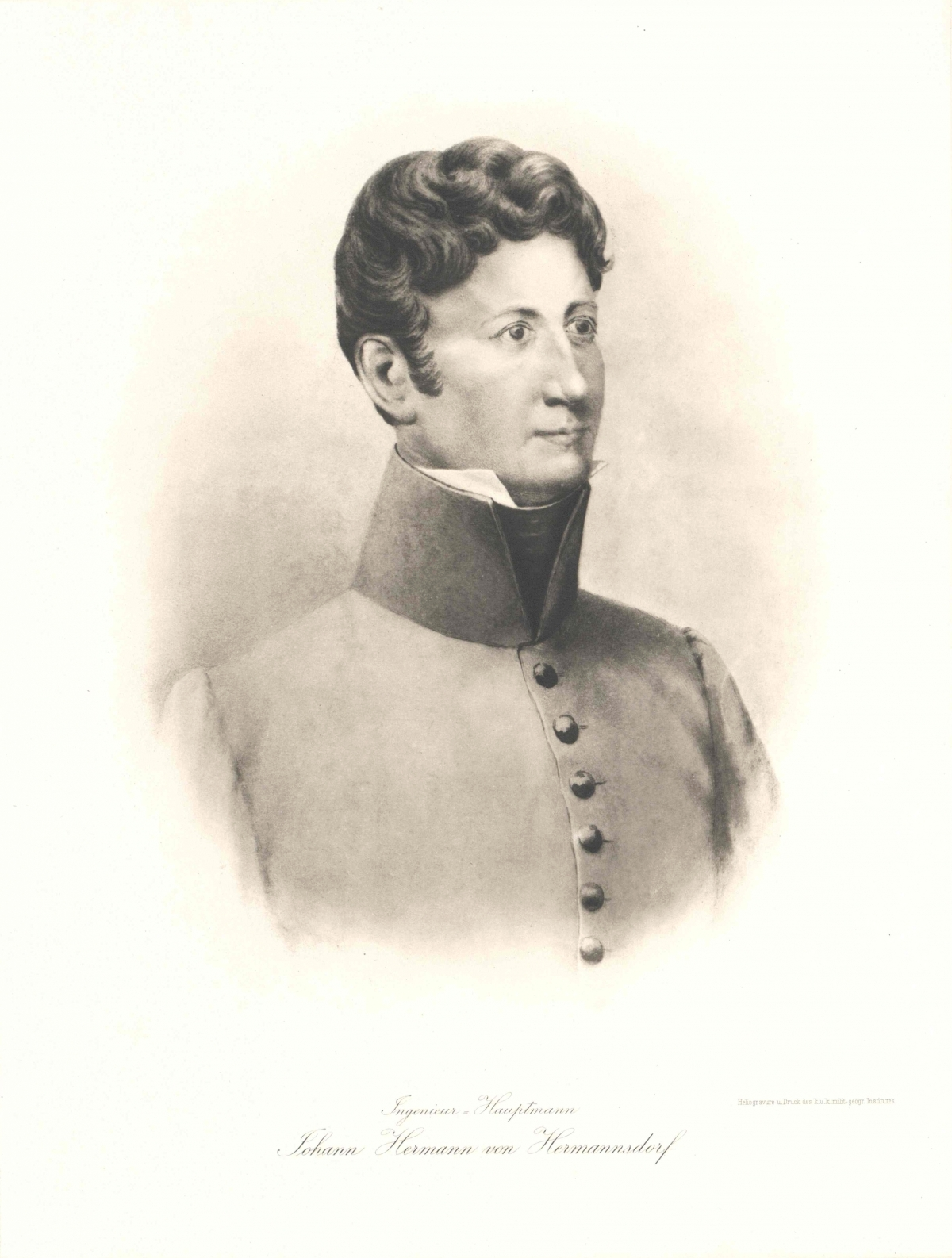
Johann Hermann

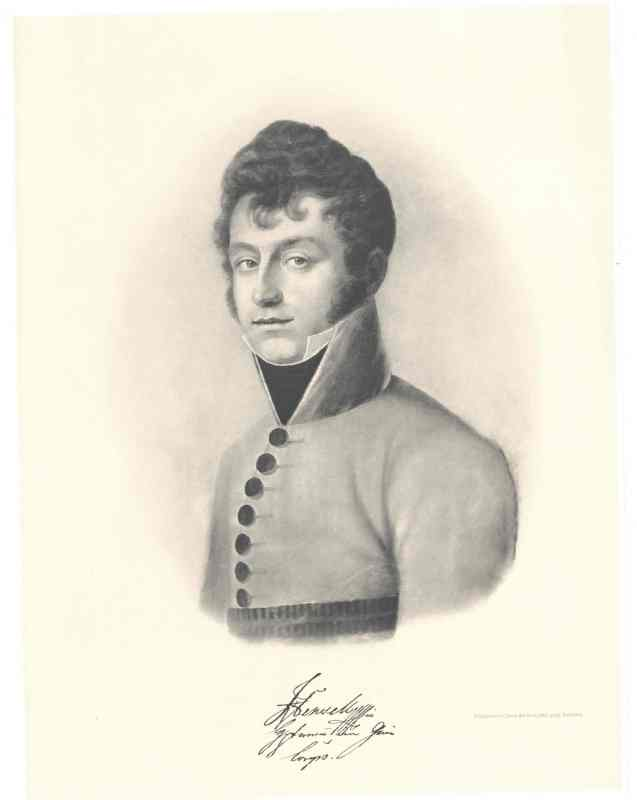
Friedrich Hensel

== Battle ==
See Battle of Piave River (1809) for the Franco-Italian order of battle.

=== Action ===
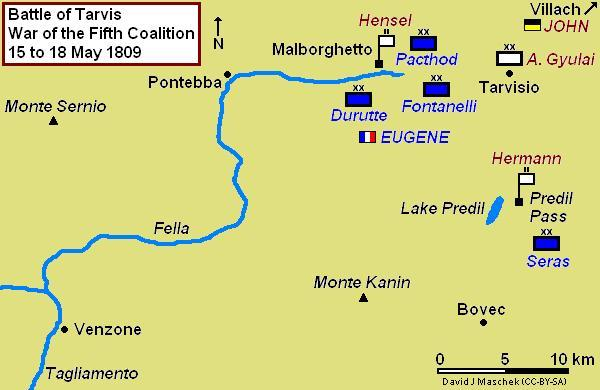
Battle of Tarvis and the storming of the Malborghetto and Predil Forts, 15–18 May 1809

When ascending the Fella, the river valley veers east at Pontebba and continues 10 kilometers east to Malborghetto. From the latter town, Tarvisio is 10 kilometers farther to the east. To reach Tarvisio from the Soča (Isonzo) valley, a road leaves Bovec and continues about 10 kilometers north-northeast before turning west to cross the Predil Pass (1,156 meters). At the foot of the pass is Lago del Predil (Lake Predil). From there, the road continues north again for about 10 kilometers before arriving at Tarvisio. The Predil blockhouse dominates the road about 800 meters east of the pass. The Malborghetto blockhouse lies about 900 meters east of Malborghetto village. (Note: These observations can be confirmed on Google Earth.) The fort is on a mountain spur that looms over the Fella valley.

In mid-May Archduke John reorganized his army into several groups. Stoichevich with 8,100 mostly Grenz infantry and 14 guns was still distant in Dalmatia. Feldmarschall-Leutnant Franz Jellacic with 10,200 troops and 16 guns of the Northern Division was transferred from the Danube army to John's control. Jellacic lay well to the north at Radstadt. Ignaz Gyulai and Zach assembled the IX Armeekorps at Kranj (Krain) with 14,880 men organized into four brigades. John held Villach with his Mobile Corps, 13,060 soldiers and 22 guns under Frimont.

Albert Gyulai was at Tarvis with his 8,340-strong division organized into three brigades. General-Major Anton Gajoli led 2,800 men of the Franz Jellacic Infantry Regiment Nr. 62, Reisky Infantry Regiment Nr. 13, and a brigade battery of eight 3-pound cannons. General-Major Franz Marziani commanded 2,800 soldiers in the Oguliner Grenz Infantry Regiment Nr. 3, Szluiner Grenz Infantry Regiment Nr. 4, four squadrons of the Ott Hussar Regiment Nr. 5, and a Grenz brigade battery of eight 3-pound guns. General-Major Peter Lutz had 2,500 men in the Marburg, Cilly, Laibach, and Adelsberg Landwehr. The artillery reserve included one position battery of six 12-pound guns.

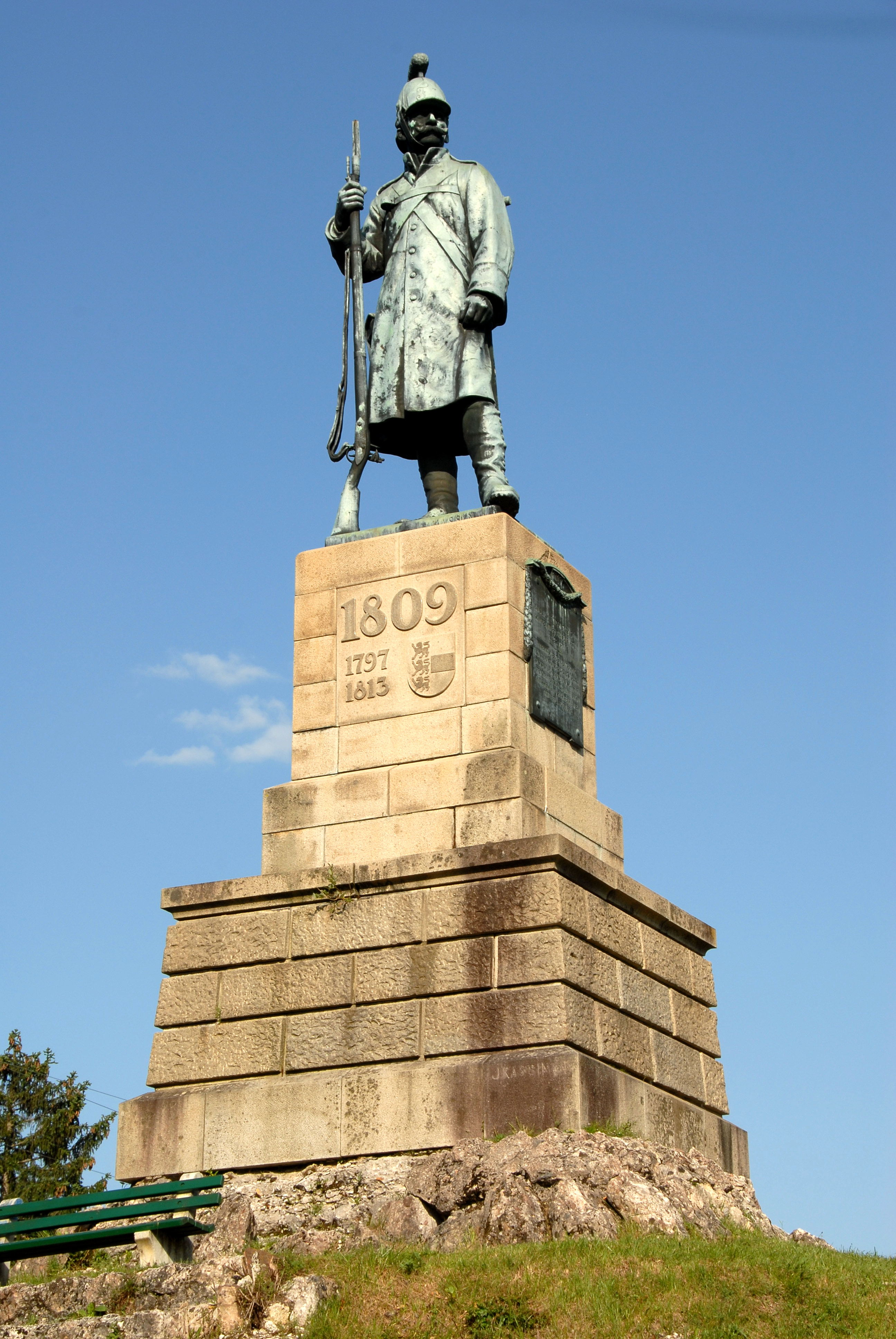
Monument to Austrian soldiers of the Napoleonic Wars in Tarvisio.

Two other historians assigned weaker forces to Albert Gyulai's division. According to Historian Robert M. Epstein, he deployed about 6,000 troops in the vicinity of Tarvis, with 650 Grenz and 10 guns holding the Malborghetto blockhouse, and 250 Grenz and eight guns defending the Predil Blockhouse. Author Digby Smith listed 3,500 Austrians and 6 guns at Tarvis, 450 men and 11 guns at Malborghetto, and 250 men and eight guns at Predil.

Grenier's corps contained the two divisions of Generals of Division Pierre François Joseph Durutte and Michel Marie Pacthod. Baraguey d'Hilliers' corps included the two divisions of General of Division Achille Fontanelli and General of Brigade Joseph Marie, Count Dessaix. Dessaix's advance guard division comprised three battalions formed from the voltiguer companies of the infantry, plus a few battalions borrowed from the other divisions. These troops arrived before the Malborghetto fort on 15 May. Eugène ordered Grenier to reduce the fort while Baraguey d'Hilliers kept Gyulai from interfering with the operation from Tarvis. Accordingly, Dessaix and Fontanelli led their troops across mountain trails to reach the Fella valley on the east side of the Malborghetto fort. Grenier sent Pacthod's troops scrambling after the other two divisions to reach an assault position from the east. On the 16th, Baraguey d'Hilliers skirmished with Gyulai, who evacuated Tarvis and took a defensive position east of the town.

At 9:30 AM on 17 May, Pacthod and Durutte's divisions rushed the Malborghetto fort from two directions, 15,000 strong. Thirty minutes later the position fell. Epstein wrote that 300 Austrians were killed and 350 captured, and accepted the Franco-Italian report of 80 casualties. A considerable supply of food was captured as well as 13 cannons. Epstein reported that the garrison had 10 guns, but that 13 guns were captured. He does not explain this. Engineer Captain Friedrich Hensel died leading his garrison of two companies of the Oguliner Grenz Infantry Regiment Nr. 3 and 24 artillerymen. Smith reported the 400 Austrian total losses as five officers and 345 men dead, six officers, 44 men, and 11 guns captured. He found Grenier's claim of only 80 casualties as "totally unbelievable" considering the bitter fighting. The Austrian official record stated that the fortifications were too extensive for the garrison. It also gave the garrison's losses as 75 killed and 305 captured including 120 wounded. The account admitted that an Austrian claim of 1,300 casualties inflicted on the attackers was improbable.

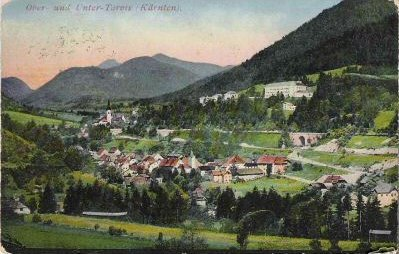
1915 Postcard of Tarvis

Grenier's victorious soldiers were rapidly marched east to Tarvis to assist in the attack against Gyulai. The Austrian commander took up a position behind the Slizza (Gailitz) stream with 11 battalions and four squadrons. In line were Gajoli's brigade, Marziani's brigade, three battalions of the Strassoldo Infantry Regiment Nr. 27, and two battalions of the Marburg Landwehr. Smith does not mention Gajoli or Marziani but does list the same units in their brigades as the Bowden & Tarbox order of battle. However, he incorrectly lists Johann Jellacic IR Nr. 53 which was with Schmidt on the upper Piave instead of the Franz Jellacic IR Nr. 62. A line of prepared defenses lined the stream bank, but only 10 of the planned 24 cannons were installed in the redoubts. At mid-day Eugène waved his troops forward. While Grenier's corps skirmished with Gyulai's center, Fontanelli's Italian division hit the Austrian left flank. The Italians seized a key redoubt and began rolling up Gyulai's defenses from the south. As the Austrian line began to crumble, Grenier's troops attacked in front. Gyulai's troops fled the field in rout, losing 3,000 killed, wounded, and prisoners, and most of their guns. Lacking cavalry, the Franco-Italians were not able to pursue. The Austrians admitted losing 217 killed, 271 wounded, and 1,301 captured, for a total of 1,789 men and six guns lost out of 3,500 engaged. Eugène admitted 80 killed and 300 wounded out of 10,000 engaged, though the latter figure does not count Grenier's troops which are listed as reserves.

Meanwhile, the column under Seras encountered opposition on the 15th when it reached the Predil Pass blockhouse. While Eugène crushed Gyulai's command on 17 May, Seras bombarded the Predil fort without effect. Engineer Captain Johann Hermann von Hermannsdorf commanded the garrison of two companies of the 1st battalion of the Szluiner Grenz Infantry Regiment Nr. 3. In order to bring his artillery, cavalry, and wagon trains to Tarvis, Eugène needed to use Predil Pass. He sent three battalions south to attack Hermann's bastion from the pass while Seras drove in from the other side. The French assault began on 18 May and met with tremendous resistance.. Epstein gives only 150 French casualties. Smith's numbers seem more credible. Hermann and every single one of the 250 Croat defenders were killed in their last stand. Out of 8,500 infantry and 12 guns, Franco-Italian losses were about 450 killed and wounded.

=== Sites ===
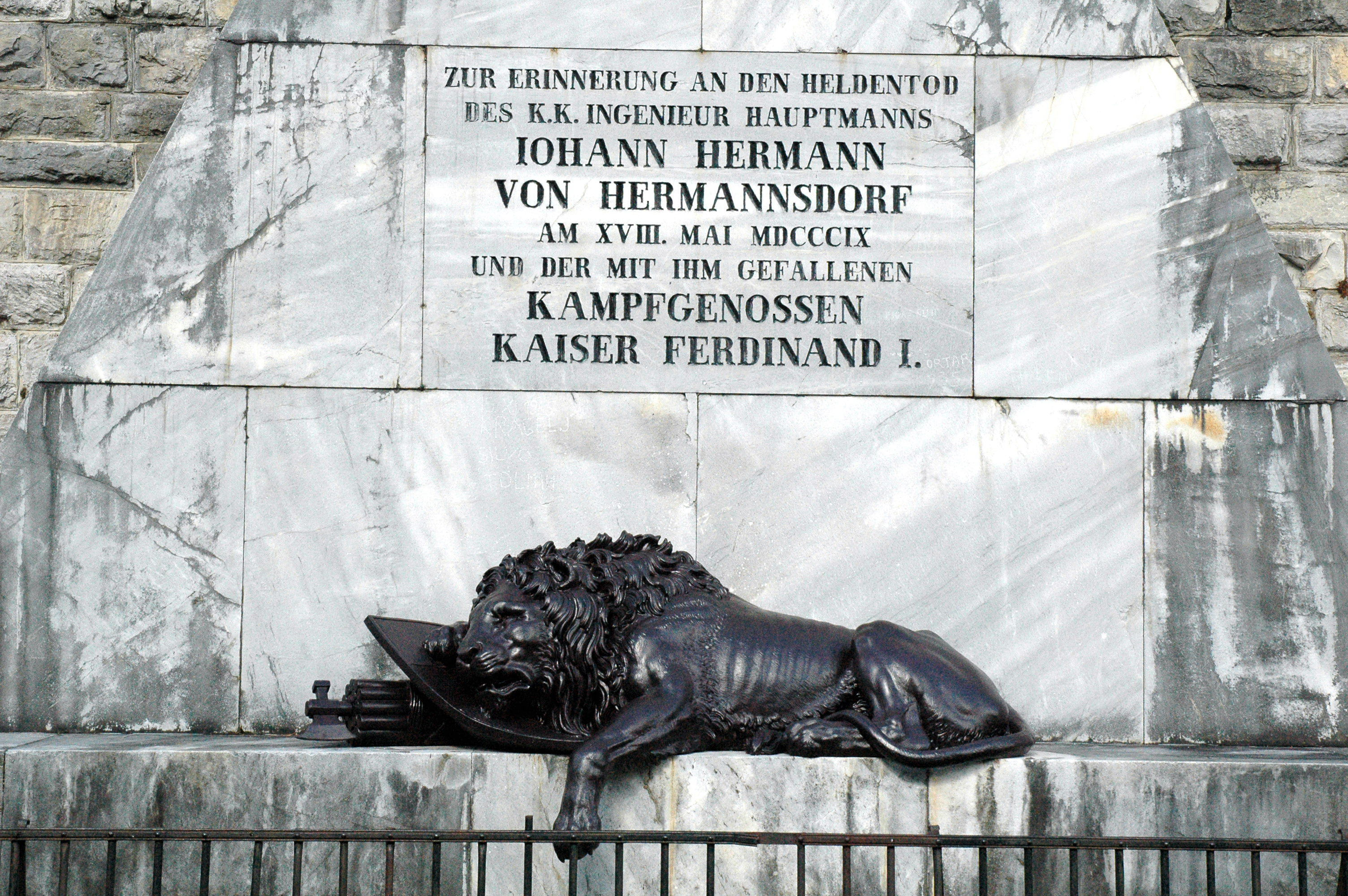
Predil Monument

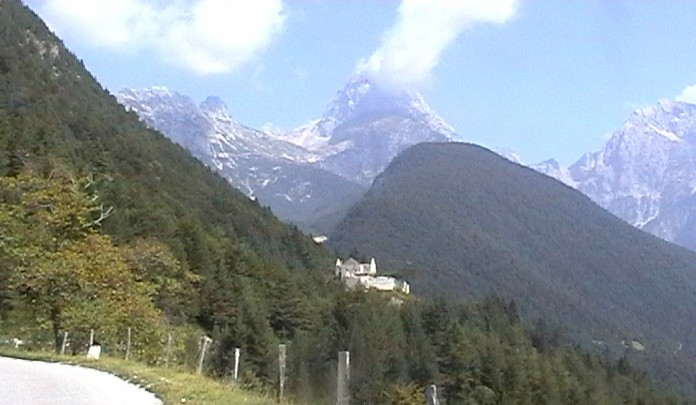
Predil Fort from the pass

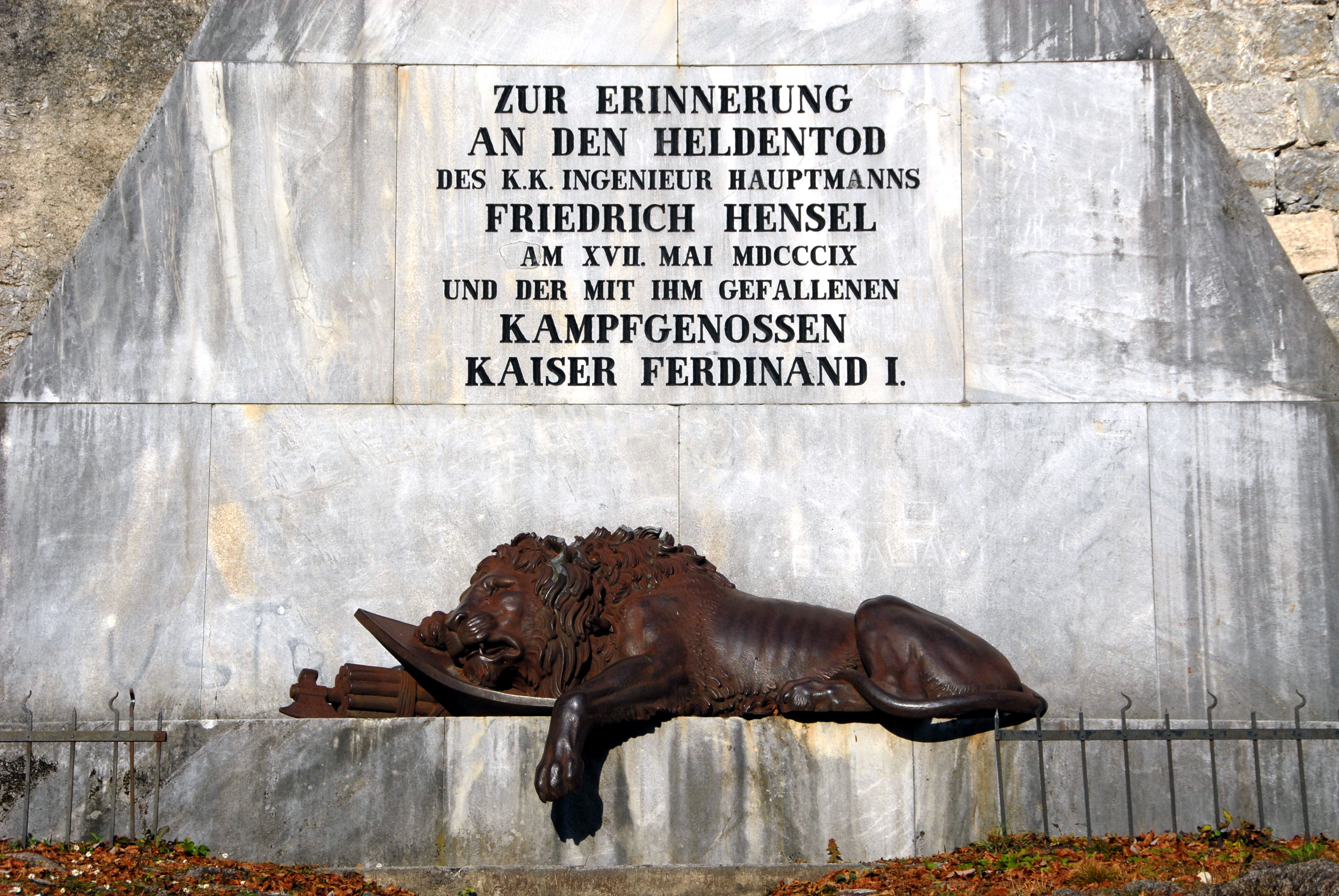
Malborghetto Monument

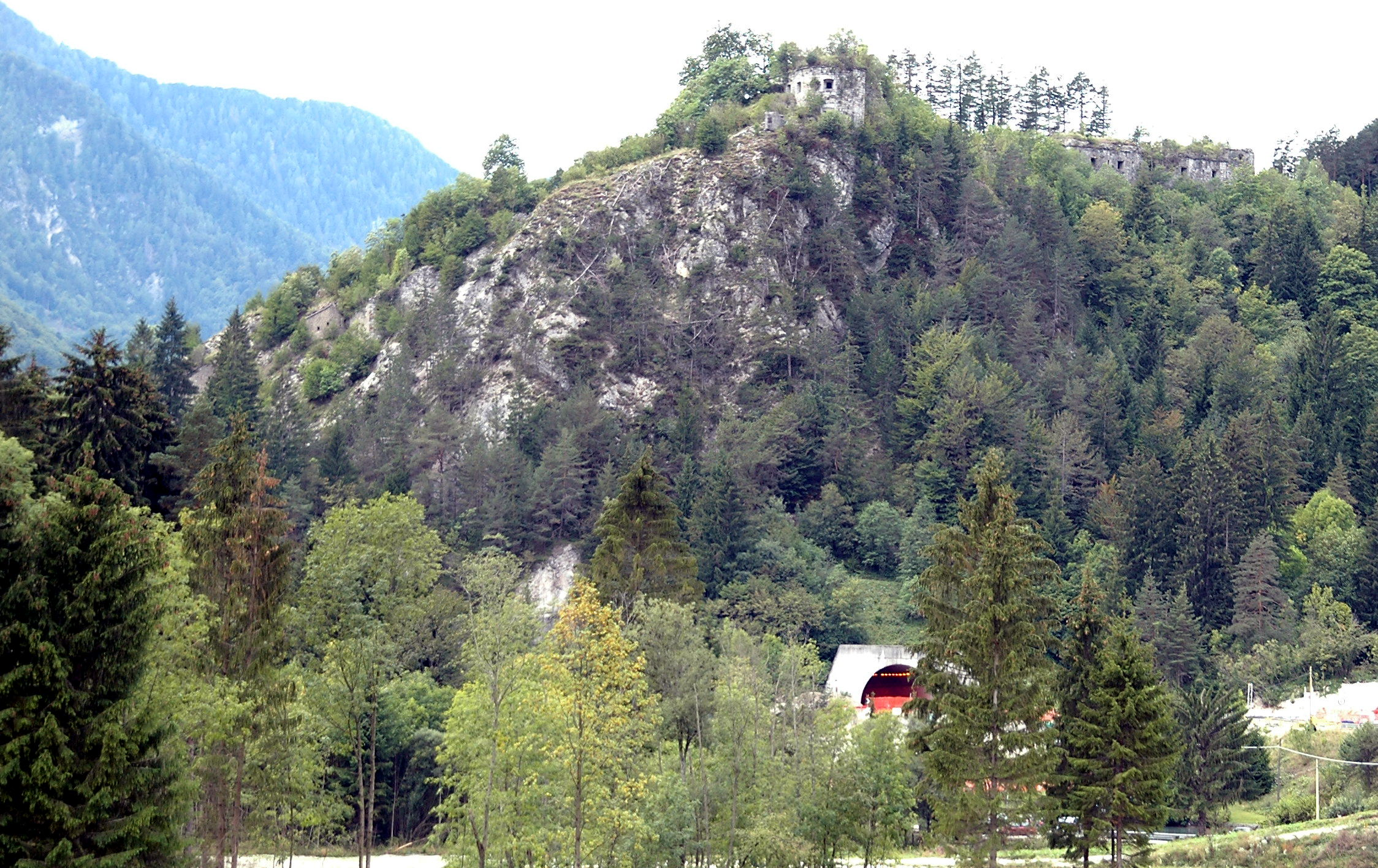
Malborghetto Fort

== Result ==
The losses incurred in the invasion and retreat seriously weakened Archduke John's army. Instead of having ample forces to defend the mountain barrier east of the Italian plains, John was left with an insufficient number of soldiers. The capture of Tarvis and its outlying forts gave Eugène an open road to Villach, which he occupied on 20 May. His troops seized Klagenfurt the following day. In both cities, the Franco-Italians found supplies that would be of future use. Eugène was forced to pause for a few days in order to let his artillery, cavalry, and wagon trains catch up with his infantry. John withdrew to Graz, where he arrived on 24 May, followed by Gyulai's bedraggled division. Eugène's patrols soon detected Jellacic's division marching across his front and sent Grenier's corps to intercept. The next action was the Battle of Sankt Michael on 25 May. Monuments to Engineer officers Hensel and Hermann and the fallen Austrian soldiers are located at both the Malborghetto and Predil forts. The one at Predil was constructed in 1849.

== Notes ==
Preceded by Battle of Wörgl	Napoleonic Wars; Battle of Tarvis (1809)	Succeeded by Battle of Aspern-Essling
