= Anton von Zach =

Austrian general (1747–1826)

Anton Freiherr von Zach
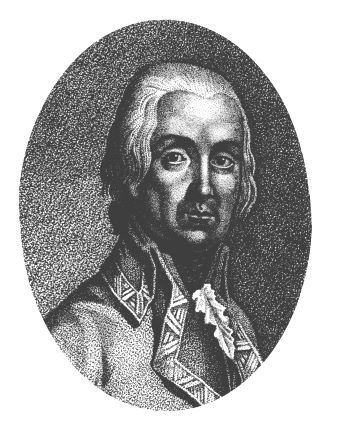
- Born: 14 June 1747; Pest, Hungary
- Died: 22 November 1826 (aged 79); Graz, Austria
- Military career
- Allegiance: Austrian Empire
- Branch: Staff
- Rank: Feldzeugmeister
- Conflicts: French Revolutionary Wars; Napoleonic Wars
- Awards: Military Order of Maria Theresa, KC 1799; Order of Leopold, CC 1809
- Other work: Inhaber Infantry Regiment # 15; Privy Councillor

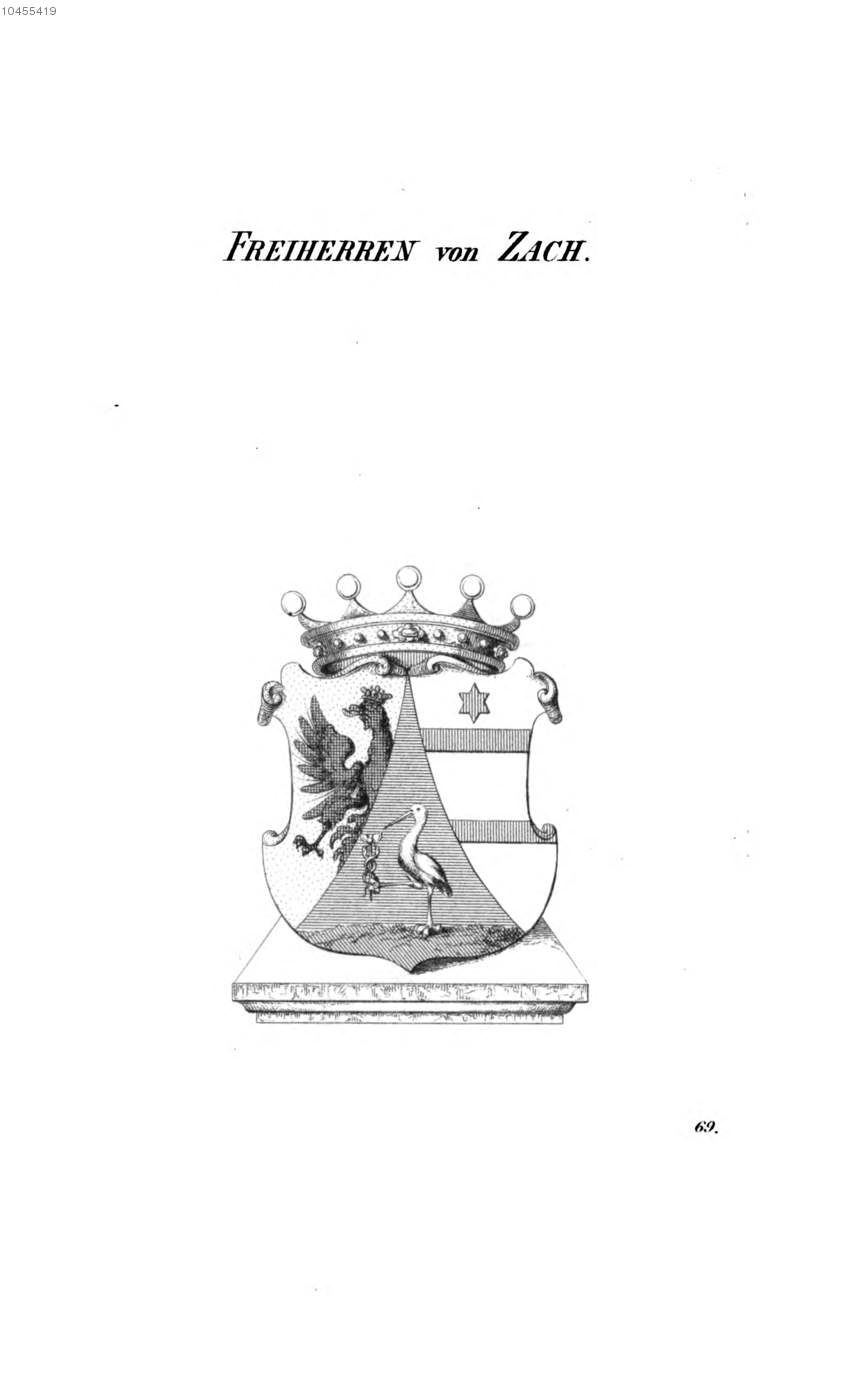
Arms of the Baron von Zach

Anton Freiherr von Zach (German pronunciation: [za:x]) (14 June 1747 – 22 November 1826) was an Austrian general with Hungarian ancestors, who enlisted in the army of Habsburg Austria and fought against the French First Republic. In the French Revolutionary Wars, he gained prominence as a staff officer. Still on active service during the Napoleonic Wars, he fought in the 1805 and 1809 wars. He was not given combat assignments after 1809.

Zach held the office of army chief of staff during the 1796, 1799, and 1800 campaigns. In the latter year, he played an important role at the Battle of Marengo, where he was captured. During the Napoleonic Wars he was again chief of staff of the Army of Italy in 1805. In 1809, he commanded a division in the Italian theatre. After 1809, the Austrian military employed him as a fortress commandant. He was Proprietor (Inhaber) of an Austrian infantry regiment from 1807 until his death.

== Early career ==
Born at Pest, Hungary, Anton Zach became a petty nobleman when his father Josef Zach (Olomuc, 4 November 1714 – Pest 16 July 1792), a physician in charge of the house of invalids in Pest – an institution founded by Maria Theresia to accommodate the many disabled soldiers who survived the War of the Austrian Succession – was elevated to Hungarian Nobility on 8 October 1765. He married Anna Freiin von Moltke (1759–1832) in Wiener Neustadt on 29 June 1779. Their daughter Theresa married Auguste Milliet de Faverges et de Challes (1780–1854).

Entering the Austrian military service, Zach became a Major in 1788, an Oberstleutnant in 1793, and an Oberst in 1795. He served as Chief of the Quartermaster General Staff (chief of staff) to Johann Peter Beaulieu from 8 April to June 1796 during the Montenotte Campaign, the Battle of Lodi, and the Battle of Borghetto. In June he was succeeded by Franz von Lauer when Dagobert Sigmund von Wurmser replaced Beaulieu. Subsequently, he served on Paul Davidovich's staff during the Battle of Rovereto on 4 September. In 1797, Zach served on a commission to analyze the reasons for Austria's defeat. He noted that lower-ranking generals displayed little initiative because there were too many regulations. He found that regimental officers showed more interest in pay and privilege and drill than in learning how to make fighting units more efficient. He saw that officers were indifferent toward the rank and file, and that the lower ranks had little trust or enthusiasm for their leaders.

From January 1798 to March 1799, Zach was chief of staff of the Armee von Italien. He assumed the chief of staff role again from July 1799 to June 1800. On 9 June 1799, he received promotion to General-major. In a private letter to the Russian ambassador that was opened by the Austrian government, the army commander Alexander Suvorov described Zach as "sound, discreet and professional, but a great deviser of Unterkunft (logistics) just when I want to burst into flaming action". Though Suvorov used Unterkunft as a pejorative, Zach was tickled rather than insulted when shown the letter. Zach performed capably at the Battle of Novi on 15 August. For his actions, a grateful emperor awarded him the Knight's Cross of the Military Order of Maria Theresa on 13 October 1799. A skilled mathematician, Zach was more at home in the field of military engineering than he was at combat leadership or in an operational role.

== Marengo ==
At the Battle of Marengo on 14 June 1800, Zach was chief of staff to Michael von Melas, the Austrian army commander. Late in the afternoon when victory seemed assured, Melas retired to the rear. Two horses had been killed under him, leaving the elderly general's left arm with a severe contusion. He instructed Konrad Valentin von Kaim to direct the pursuit of Napoleon Bonaparte's apparently defeated army. Instead of advising Kaim, Zach rode off to join the advance elements. Historian David G. Chandler asserts that Melas handed tactical control of the pursuit to Zach and does not mention Kaim's role.

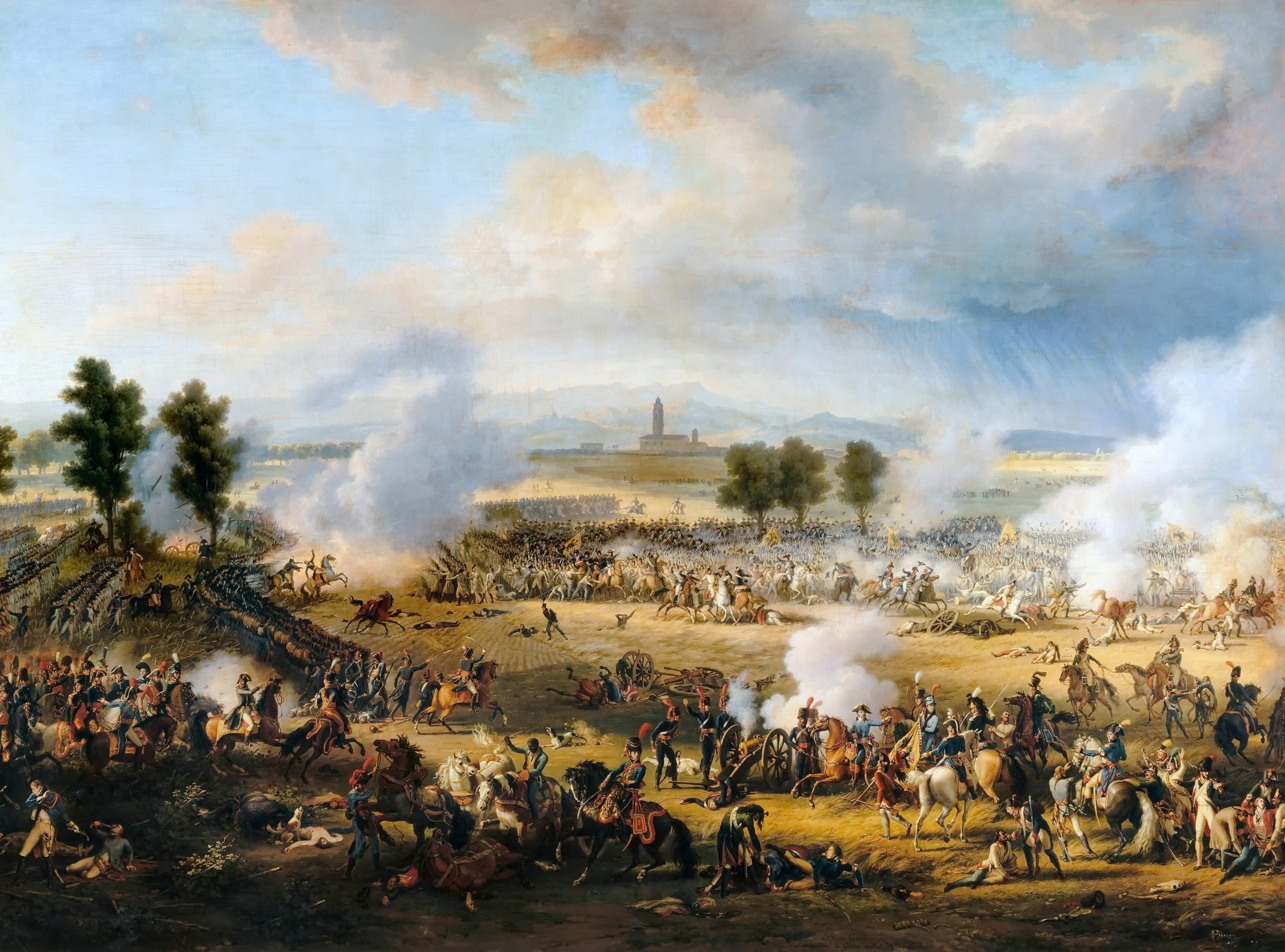
The Battle of Marengo by Louis-François Lejeune. Crisis of the Battle of Marengo, showing the attacks of Desaix and Kellermann. The cavalry is wrongly shown attacking the Austrian right flank

The advancing Austrians instead encountered Louis Desaix with Jean Boudet's fresh French division. Desaix attacked and defeated the Michael Wallis Infantry Regiment Nr. 11, which retired behind a brigade of grenadiers. As the elite Austrian infantry pressed forward, Desaix attacked again with artillery support from Auguste Marmont's battery. At that moment, an Austrian artillery caisson detonated in a huge explosion and François Etienne de Kellermann's heavy cavalry crashed into the Austrian left flank. These shocks completely unnerved three grenadier battalions and triggered a mass surrender. In the midst of the rout, Trooper Riche of the 2nd Cavalry Regiment grabbed Zach by the throat and secured his surrender.

The survivors of the French charge dashed through the ranks of the already-shaken Michael Wallis Regiment. This unit promptly bolted through the formations farther back in the column, causing a panic. Meanwhile, the Austrian cavalry regiment that should have protected the infantry from Kellermann's attack also stampeded and carried away other cavalry units. Kaim and other officers were unable to halt the terror-stricken soldiers. Though the army's center was routed, a second grenadier brigade and some unbroken cavalry covered its retreat. The commanders of the right and left flank columns, Andreas O'Reilly von Ballinlough and Peter Karl Ott von Bátorkéz managed to bring their troops away with minimal additional loss.

That evening, Bonaparte proposed a temporary truce to his prisoner, and Zach was allowed to send a note through the lines with the suggestion. The badly rattled Melas agreed to the truce. Bonaparte fully exploited his opponent's demoralized state in the negotiations that followed, in which Zach played a minor role. The result was the Convention of Alessandria, in which the Austrian army was allowed to retreat behind the Mincio River in return for evacuating all of their hard-won gains Piedmont and Lombardy. An Austrian officer noted that the empire would have been better served if Zach had been teaching at the military academy rather than directing the advance guard at Marengo.

Evidently, Melas bore a grudge against Zach. When he introduced Zach to his successor, Count Heinrich von Bellegarde, Melas said, "You see this little man, he has a soul as black as his countenance". Yet Bellegarde employed Zach as chief of staff from September 1800 to March 1801, including the Battle of the Mincio River. Zach attained the noble rank of Freiherr on 4 February 1801.

Zach's daughter Maria Angelika Wilhelmine (1784–1855) married Oberstleutnant Franz Xaver Richter von Binnenthal (1759–1840) in 1802. Zach brought his family to Padua while he and Richter mapped the province of Venetia. Richter met Maria in Padua and married her there. Like his father-in-law, Richter served on the staff and became a general officer. Zach's son-in-law rose in rank to become a Feldzeugmeister in 1836 and wrote an autobiography of his career in the military.

In 1801 or 1802, his other daughter Josepha (Wiener Neustadt, 11 June 1781 - Graz, 18 October 1857) married Hauptmann Ignaz Freiherr von Reinisch (Žatec, 9 June 1768 – Wiener Neustadt, 23 September 1843). Reinisch was later awarded with the Military Order of Maria Theresia, was ennobled to Freiherr, later Feldmarschall-Leutnant and Director of the Theresian Military Academy in Wiener Neustadt.

== Napoleonic Wars ==
Zach was promoted to Feldmarschallleutnant on 1 September 1805. That year he served as chief of staff in Archduke Charles' Armee von Italien. The army fought the Battle of Caldiero from 29 to 31 October. This action was Austria's best showing during the War of the Third Coalition. After the war, Charles dismissed Zach as too old to serve as chief of staff. On 23 September 1807, Zach became Proprietor (Inhaber) of Infantry Regiment Nr. 15 and held the post during his lifetime.

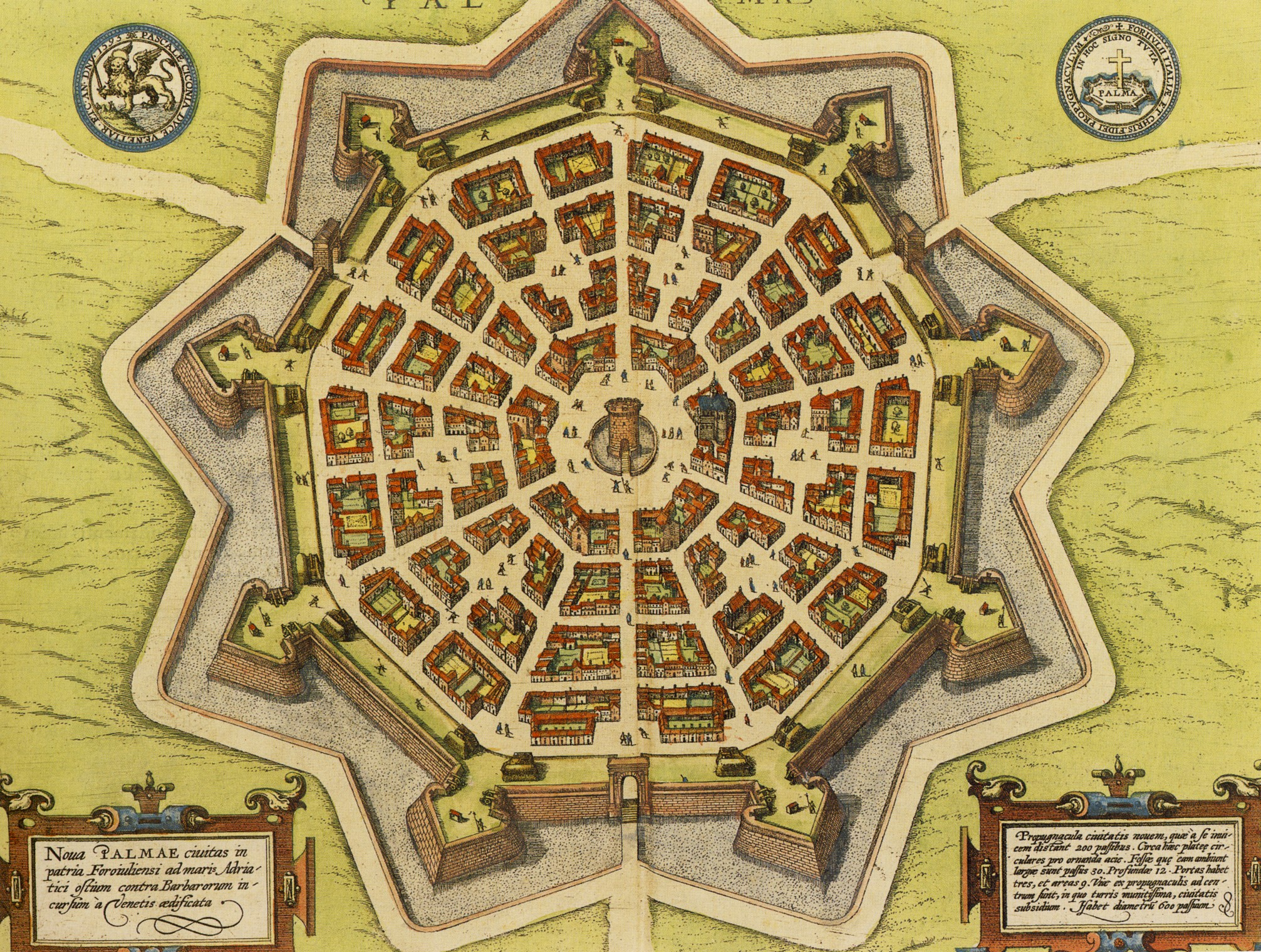
Palmanova in 1600

At the beginning of the War of the Fifth Coalition, an army under Archduke John of Austria invaded Italy. Surprised by the early timing of the invasion, the French commander Eugène de Beauharnais left garrisons at Osoppo and Palmanova and fell back to Sacile. Eugène unwisely attacked John's army and was defeated in the Battle of Sacile on 16 April 1809. Subsequently, the French general retreated to Verona. Meanwhile, John left a brigade under Zach to blockade the fortress of Palmanova. After John's retreat from Italy and the Battle of Piave River on 8 May, Johann Kalnássy's brigade became separated from the main army. Zach joined Kalnássy and both fell back across the Isonzo River into Carniola (modern-day Slovenia) on 13 May 1809.

Eugene directed Jacques MacDonald to capture Ljubljana (Laibach), which he did on 23 May after seizing a fort at Prawald on the 20th. Zach and Kalnássy were too weak to oppose MacDonald's corps and 7,000 muskets, 71 artillery pieces, and large stockpiles of food and ammunition fell into French hands. An order of battle dated 15 May, names Zach as a division commander in Ignaz Gyulai's IX Armeekorps, located at Kranj. He supervised brigades led by Kalnássy, Alois von Gavasini, Ignaz Splényi, and Joseph Munkácsy. Gyulai's force later fought in the Battle of Graz from 24 to 26 June.

Zach received the Order of Leopold in 1809. After this year, he was no longer employed in the field. He was deputy commandant of the Olomouc (Olmütz) fortress from 1810 to 1812. In November 1812, he became commandant of the fortress and in 1815 he became governor of Olomouc. Still governor, Zach officially retired from military service in early 1825 and was appointed to the rank of Feldzeugmeister. He died in Graz on 22 November 1826.

== Notes ==
Military offices
Preceded by Karl, Freiherr von Riese	Proprietor of Infantry Regiment Nr. 15; 1807–1826	Succeeded by Unknown
