= Fontaine-en-Dormois =

- Commune
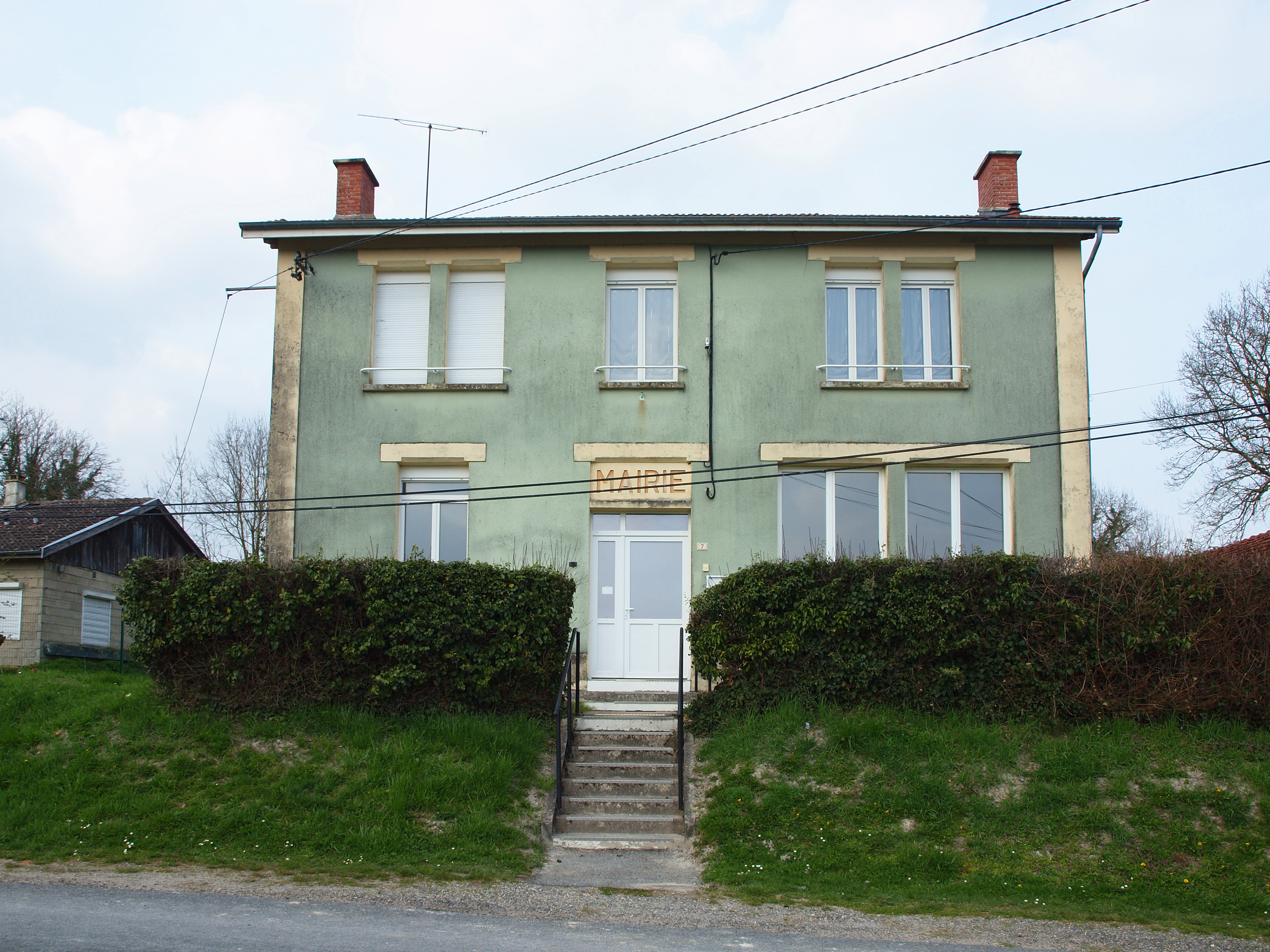
- The town hall in Fontaine-en-Dormois
- Location of Fontaine-en-Dormois
- Location within France Location within Grand Est
- Coordinates: 49°14′18″N 4°43′06″E
- Country: France
- Region: Grand Est
- Department: Marne
- Arrondissement: Châlons-en-Champagne
- Canton: Argonne Suippe et Vesle
- Intercommunality: Argonne Champenoise

Government
  - Mayor (2020–2026): Maryse Seignier
- Area^{1}: 5.29 km^{2} (2.04 sq mi)
- Elevation: 171 m (561 ft)
- Highest elevation: 194 m (636 ft)
- Lowest elevation: 122 m (400 ft)
- Population (2023): 16
  - Density: 3.0/km^{2} (7.8/sq mi)
- Time zone: UTC+01:00 (CET)
  - Summer (DST): UTC+02:00 (CEST)
- INSEE/Postal code: 51255 /51800
- ^{1} French Land Register data, which excludes lakes, ponds, glaciers > 1 km^{2} (0.386 sq mi or 247 acres) and river estuaries.

Fontaine-en-Dormois is a commune in the Marne department in north-eastern France.

== See also ==
- Communes of the Marne department
