= Moiremont =

- Commune
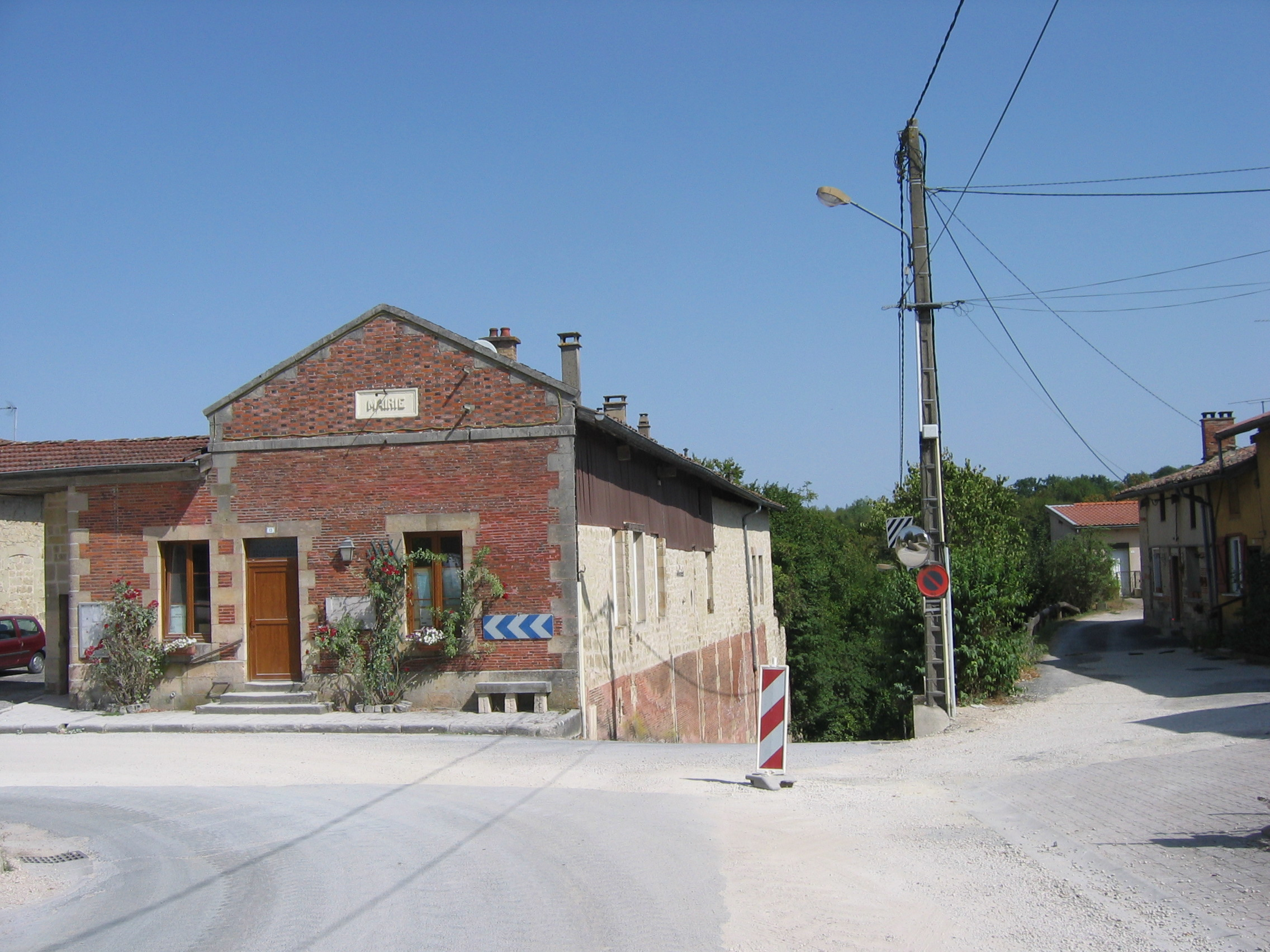
- The town hall in Moiremont

- Coat of arms
- Location of Moiremont
- Location within France Location within Grand Est
- Coordinates: 49°08′01″N 4°53′17″E
- Country: France
- Region: Grand Est
- Department: Marne
- Arrondissement: Châlons-en-Champagne
- Canton: Argonne Suippe et Vesle
- Intercommunality: Argonne Champenoise

Government
  - Mayor (2020–2026): Patrick Desingly
- Area^{1}: 16.98 km^{2} (6.56 sq mi)
- Elevation: 167 m (548 ft)
- Population (2023): 187
  - Density: 11.0/km^{2} (28.5/sq mi)
- Time zone: UTC+01:00 (CET)
  - Summer (DST): UTC+02:00 (CEST)
- INSEE/Postal code: 51370 /51800
- ^{1} French Land Register data, which excludes lakes, ponds, glaciers > 1 km^{2} (0.386 sq mi or 247 acres) and river estuaries.

Moiremont (French pronunciation: [mwaʁmɔ̃]) is a commune in the Marne department in north-eastern France.

== Places & Monuments ==
- Moiremont abbey is a former Benedictine abbey founded in 707 in the form of a congregation. In 1074, Reims' Archbishop, Manasses II sent benedictions and gave a foundation chart on Odalric's demand.
  Pierre Pérignon, born in Sainte-Menehould in 1639, joined the congregation when he was around 16 before joining Saint-Vannes abbey in Verdun where he became a monk under the famous name Dom Pérignon.
  The only remaining part of the abbey to this day is the Abbatial church which was reformed into a Parochial church after the French Revolution.
- Saint-Placide wash house.
- Timber framing houses.

== See also ==
- Communes of the Marne department
