= List of rivers of Croatia =

This is a list of rivers in Croatia.

== By length within Croatia ==
River	Length within Croatia (km)	Total length (km)	Drains into
Sava	562	945	Danube
Drava	505	749	Danube
Kupa	296	296	Sava
Danube	188	2860	Black Sea
Bosut	151 (89 and Biđ)	186	Sava
Korana	134	134	Kupa
Bednja	133	133	Drava
Lonja-Trebež	133	133	Sava
Česma	124	124	Lonja-Trebež
Una	120	212	Sava
Vuka	112	112	Danube
Dobra	104	104	Kupa
Cetina	101	101	Adriatic Sea
Glina	100	100	Kupa
Karašica	91	91	Drava
Sutla	89	92	Sava
Orljava	89	89	Sava
Ilova	85	85	Lonja-Trebež
Odra	83	83	Kupa
Lika	78	78	subterranean
Krapina	75	75	Sava
Krka	73	73	Adriatic Sea
Vučica	73	73	Karašica
Pakra	72	72	Lonja-Trebež
Sunja	69	69	Sava
Zrmanja	69	69	Adriatic Sea
Mura	67	483	Drava
Plitvica (river)	65	65	Drava
Mrežnica	63	63	Korana
Glogovnica	61	61	Česma
Bijela	59	59	Pakra
Gliboki	57	57	Drava
Kupčina	56	56	Kupa
Mirna	53	53	Adriatic Sea
Bistra Koprivnička	53	53	Drava
Toplica	50	50	Ilova
Veliki Strug	47	47	Sava
Londža	49	49	Orljava
Trnava	47	47	Mura
Zelina	44	44	Lonja
Čađavica	43	43	Drava
Butižnica	40	42	Krka
Subocka	40	40	Veliki Strug
Čikola	39	39	Krka
Boljunčica	33	33	Adriatic Sea
Karašica	31	83	Danube
Raša	23	23	Adriatic Sea
Črnec	20+	20+	Glogovnica
Črnec	20+	20+	Lonja-Strug canal
Neretva	21	232	Adriatic Sea
Rječina	19	19	Adriatic Sea
Studva	19?	37	Bosut
Čabranka	17.4	17.5	Kupa
Slunjčica	12.5	12.5	Korana
Gacka	11	11	Adriatic Sea
Krupa	10.8	10.8	Zrmanja
Dragonja	7+	30	Adriatic Sea
Jesenica	6.5	6.5	Slunjčica
Jadro	4	4	Adriatic Sea
Bijela	3	3	Adriatic Sea
Ombla	0.03	0.03	Adriatic Sea

== See also ==
- Geography of Croatia

== Sources ==
- Statistical Yearbook of the Republic of Croatia 2018 (PDF) (in Croatian and English). Zagreb: Croatian Bureau of Statistics. December 2018. ISSN 1333-3305.
- "Geographical and meteorological data" (PDF). Statistical Yearbook. Croatian Bureau of Statistics. 2007.
- Croatian Government (24 June 2010). "Odluka o Popisu voda 1. reda" [Decision on the List of waters of the first order]. Narodne novine (79/2010).
- "Karakteristike značajnijih vodotoka" [Characteristics of significant waterways]. Vodnogospodarska osnova Hrvatske - Strategija upravljanja vodama (in Croatian). Croatian Parliament. Archived from the original on 2013-10-29.
- Čanjevac, Ivan; Pavlek, Katarina; Orešić, Danijel (2022). "River lengths in Croatia determined from a topographic map at a scale of 1:25,000". Croatian Geographical Bulletin. 84 (1).
