= Sisak-Moslavina County =

County in Croatia

Coordinates: 45°13′15″N 16°15′05″E

Sisak-Moslavina County Sisačko-moslavačka županija (Croatian)
- County
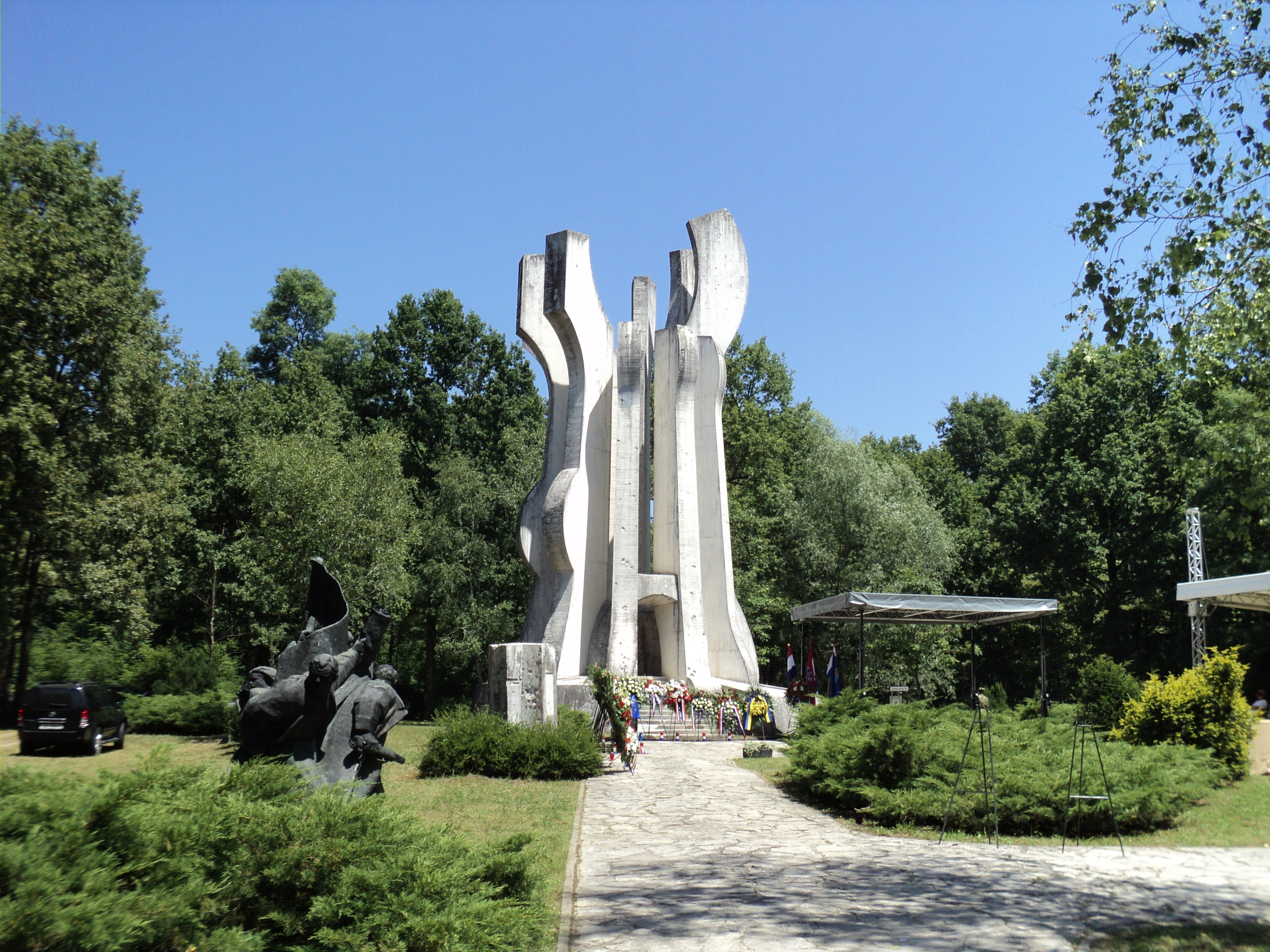
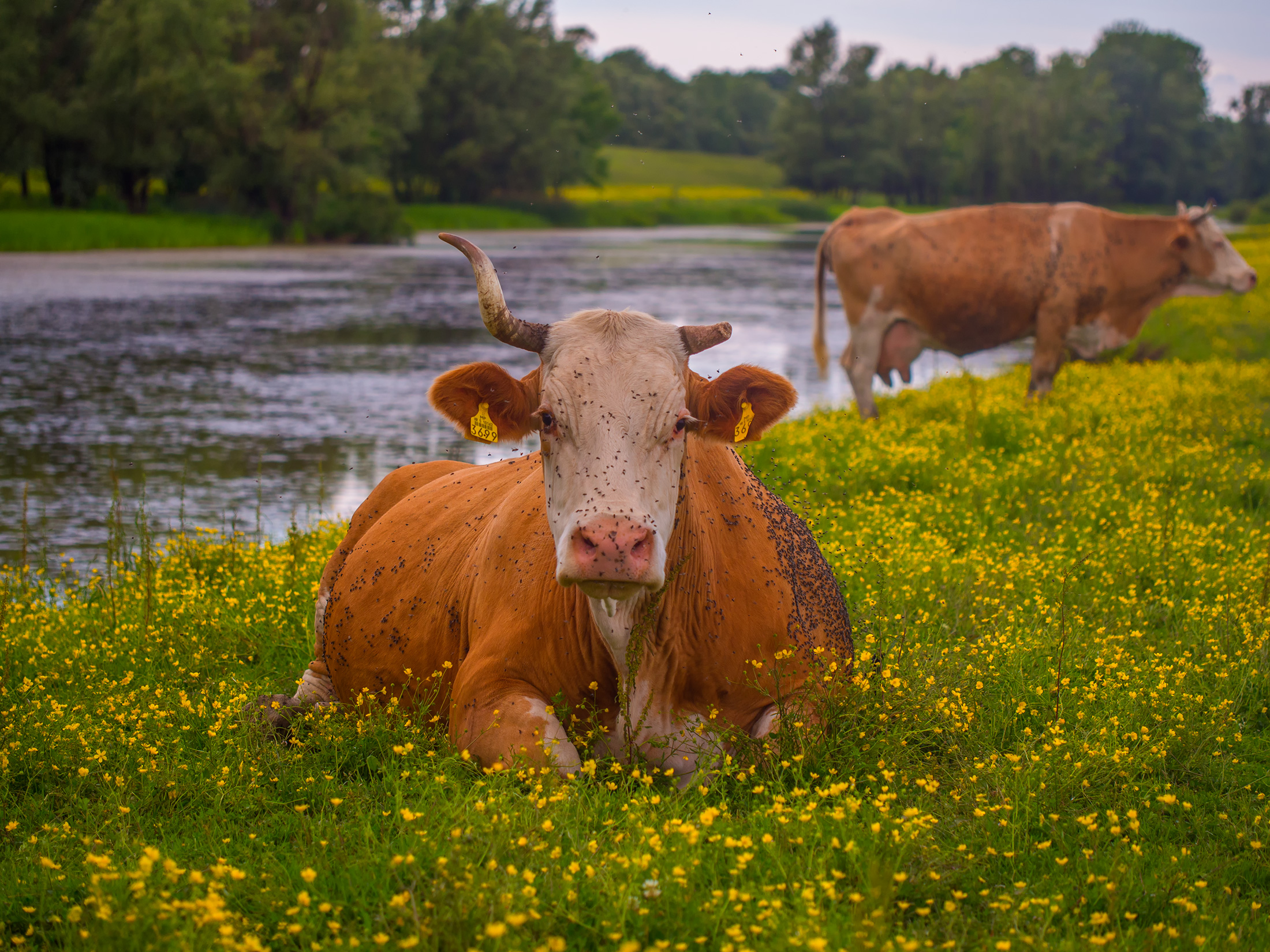
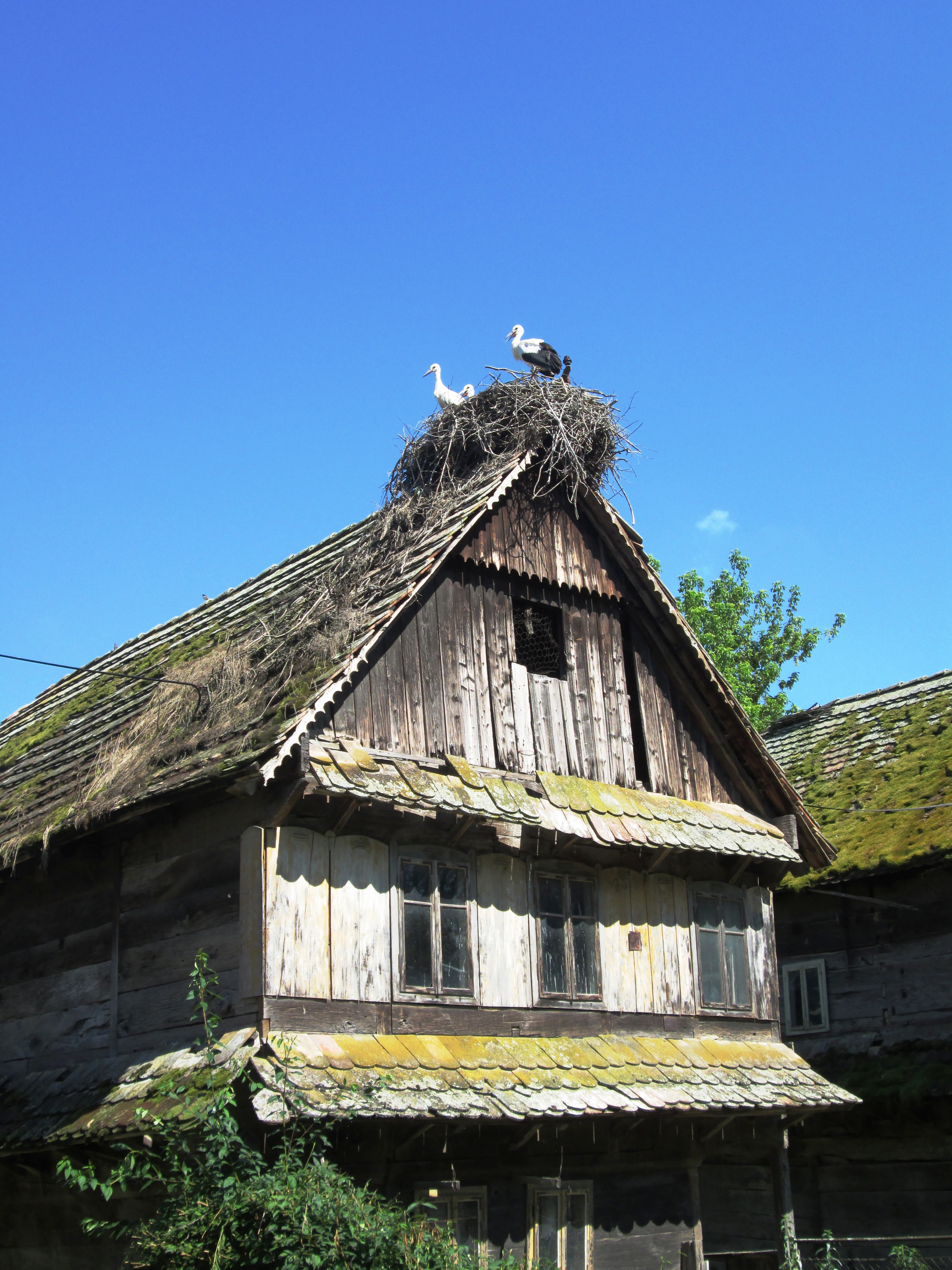
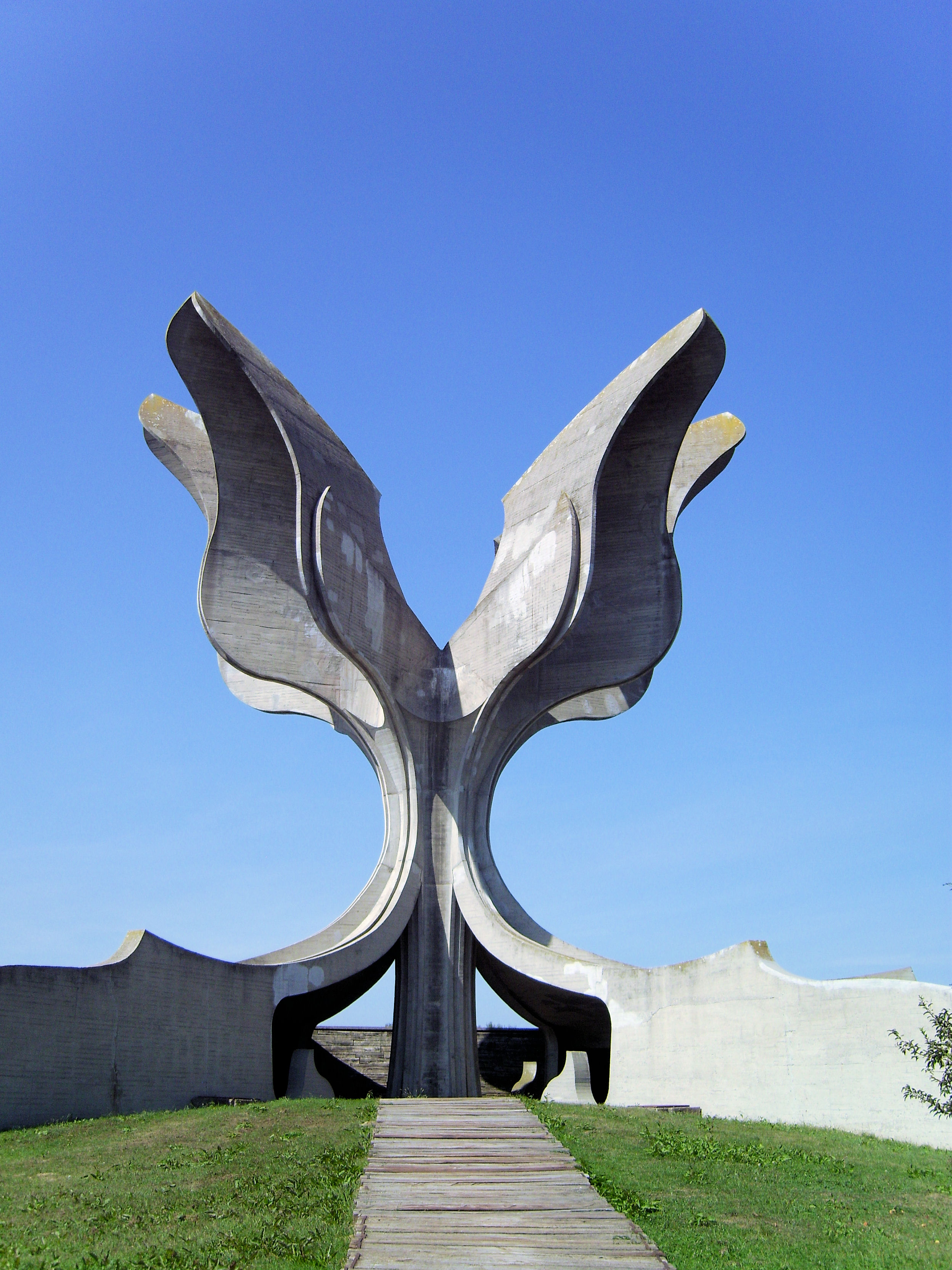
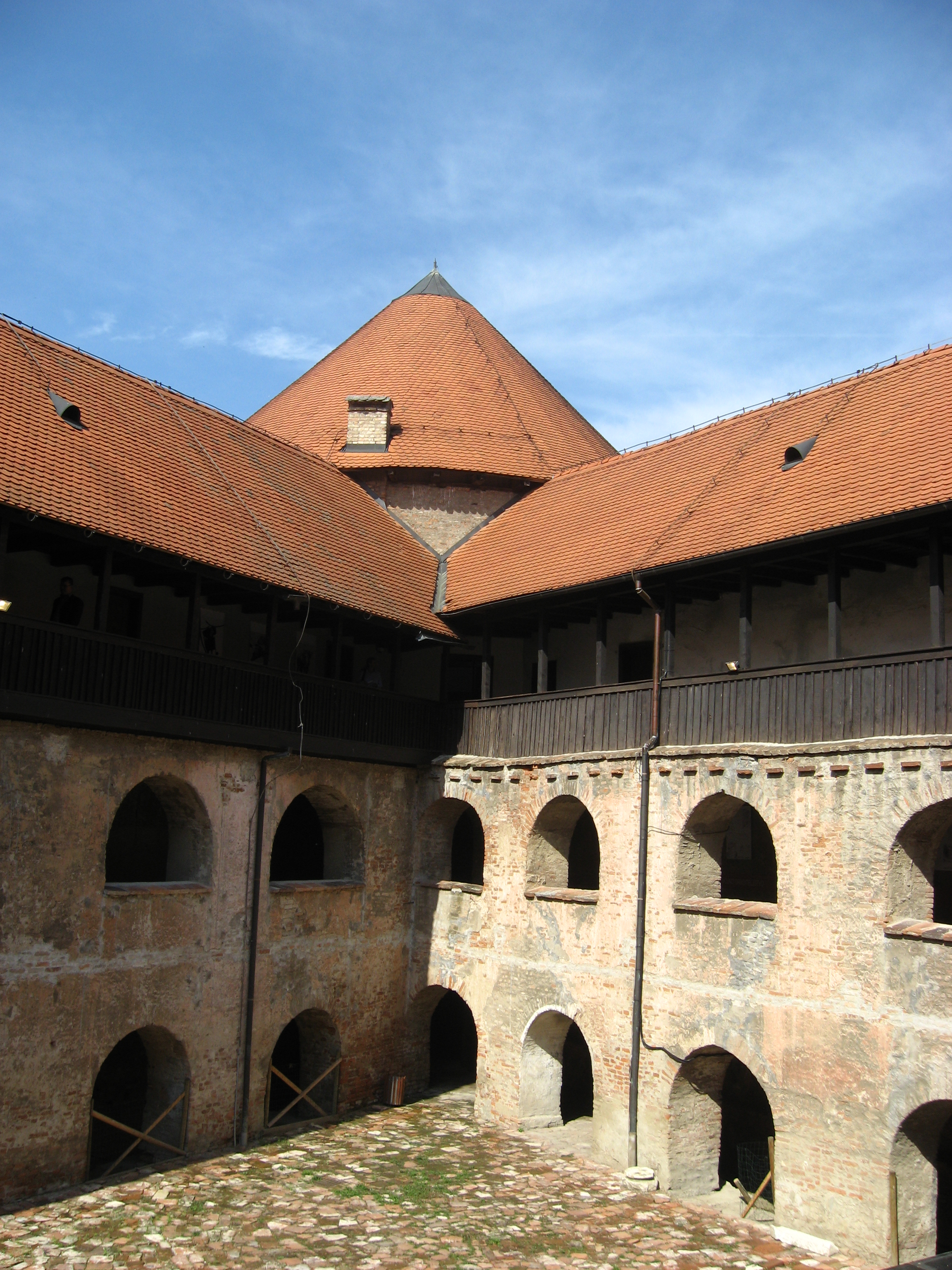
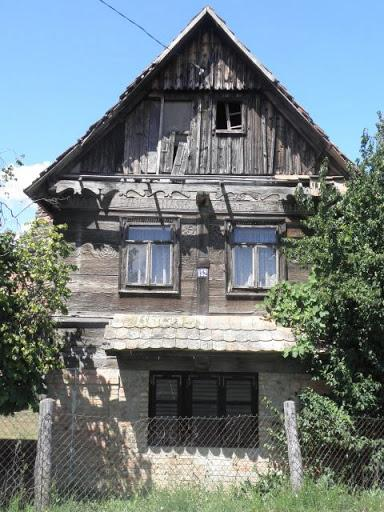
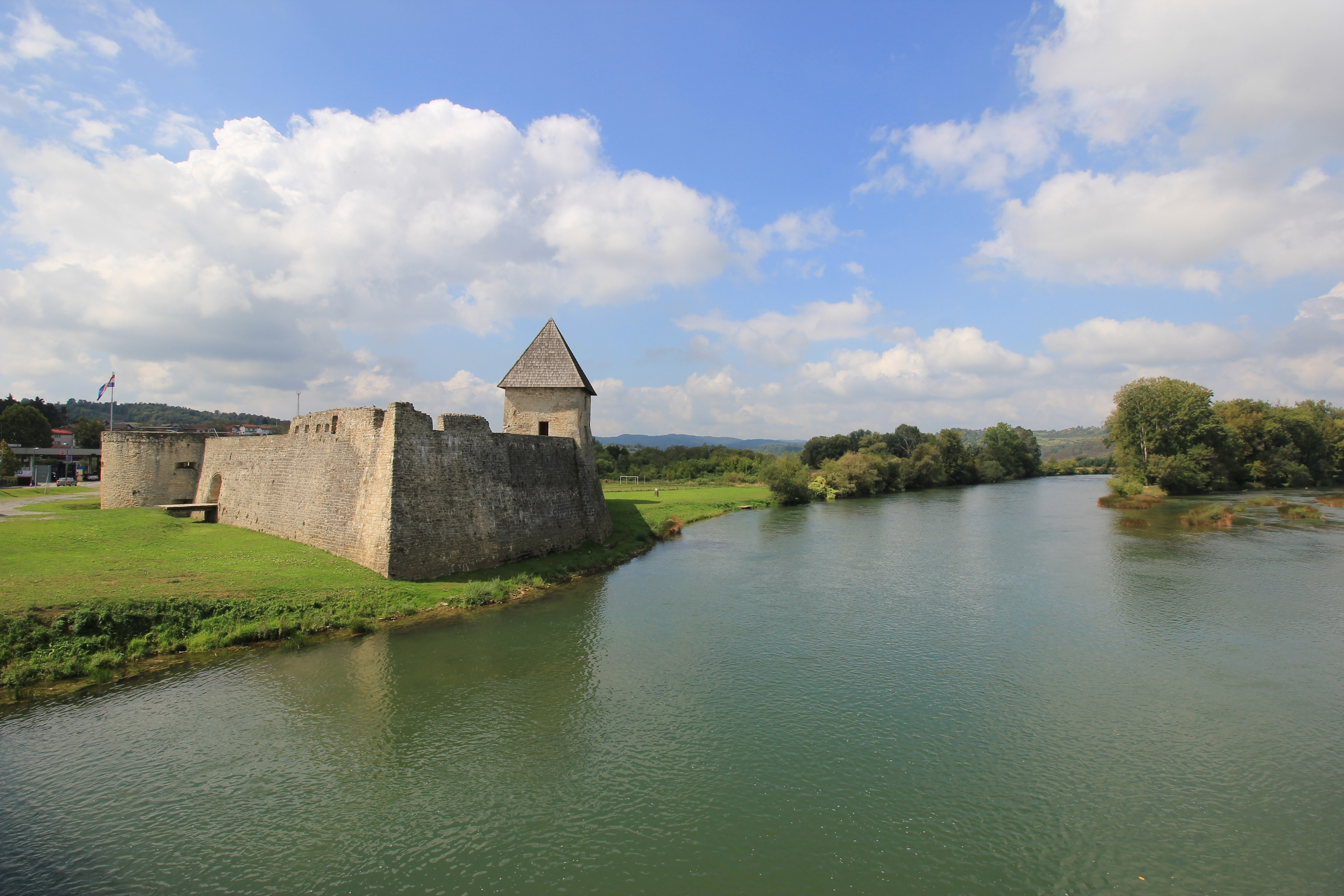
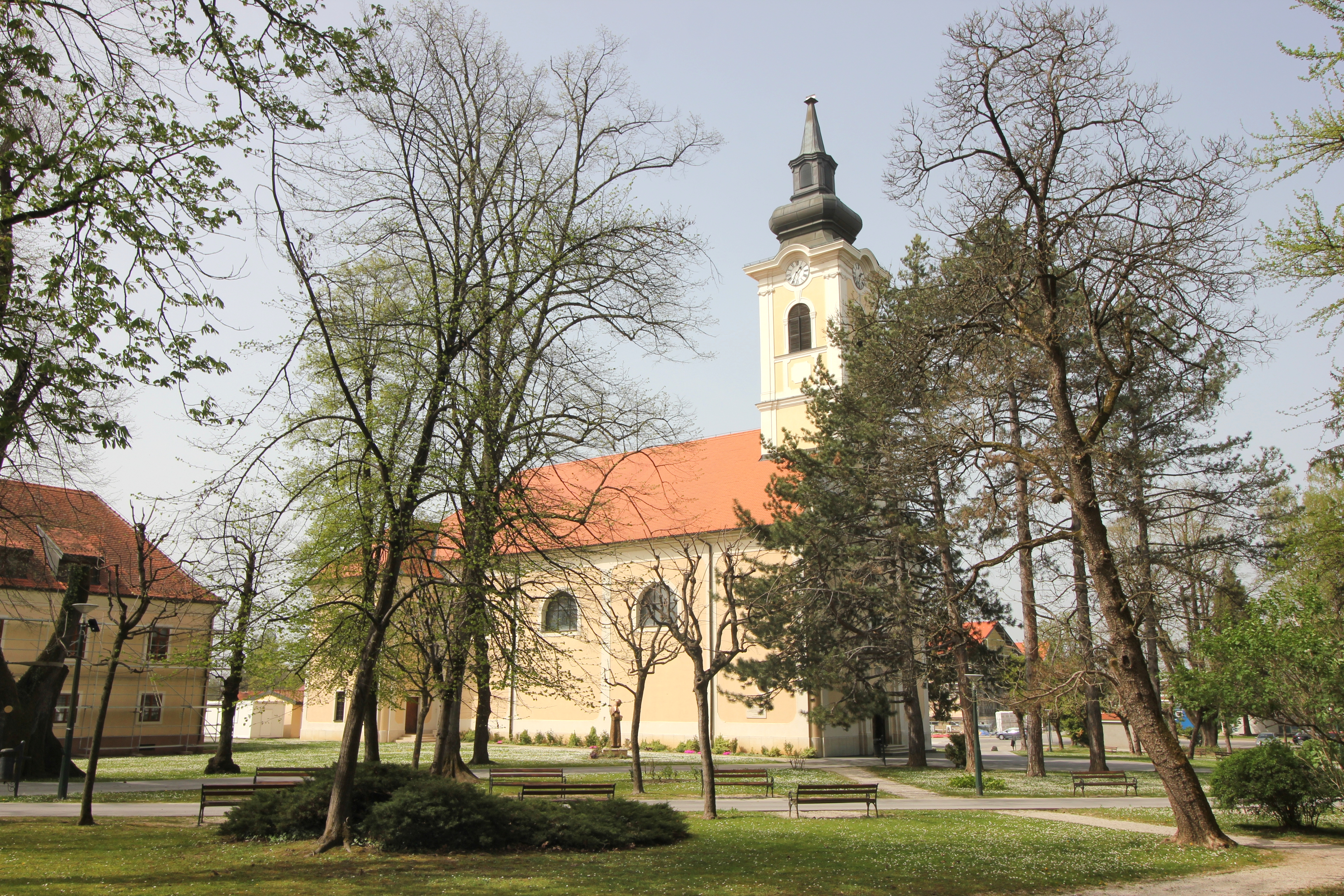
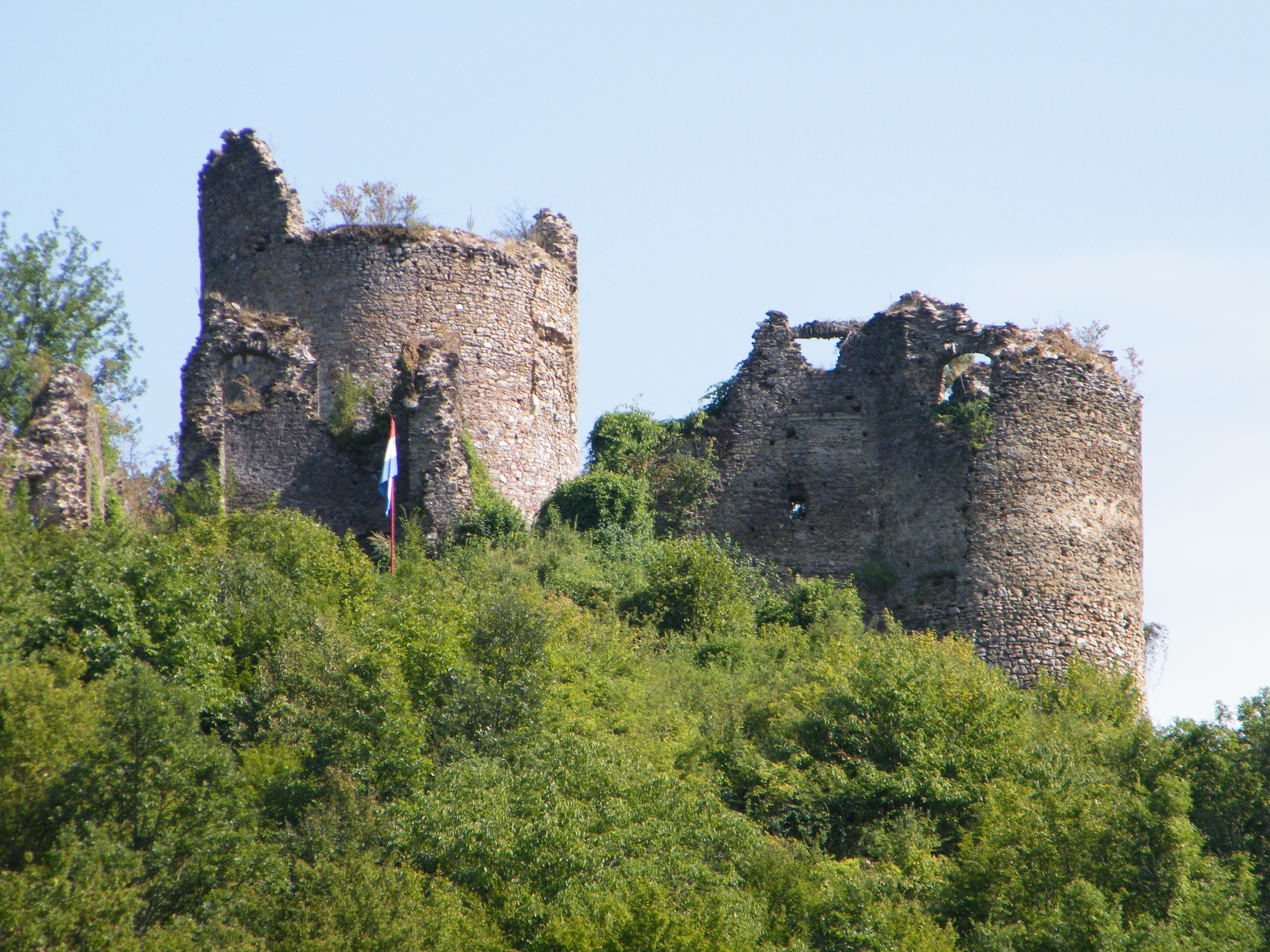
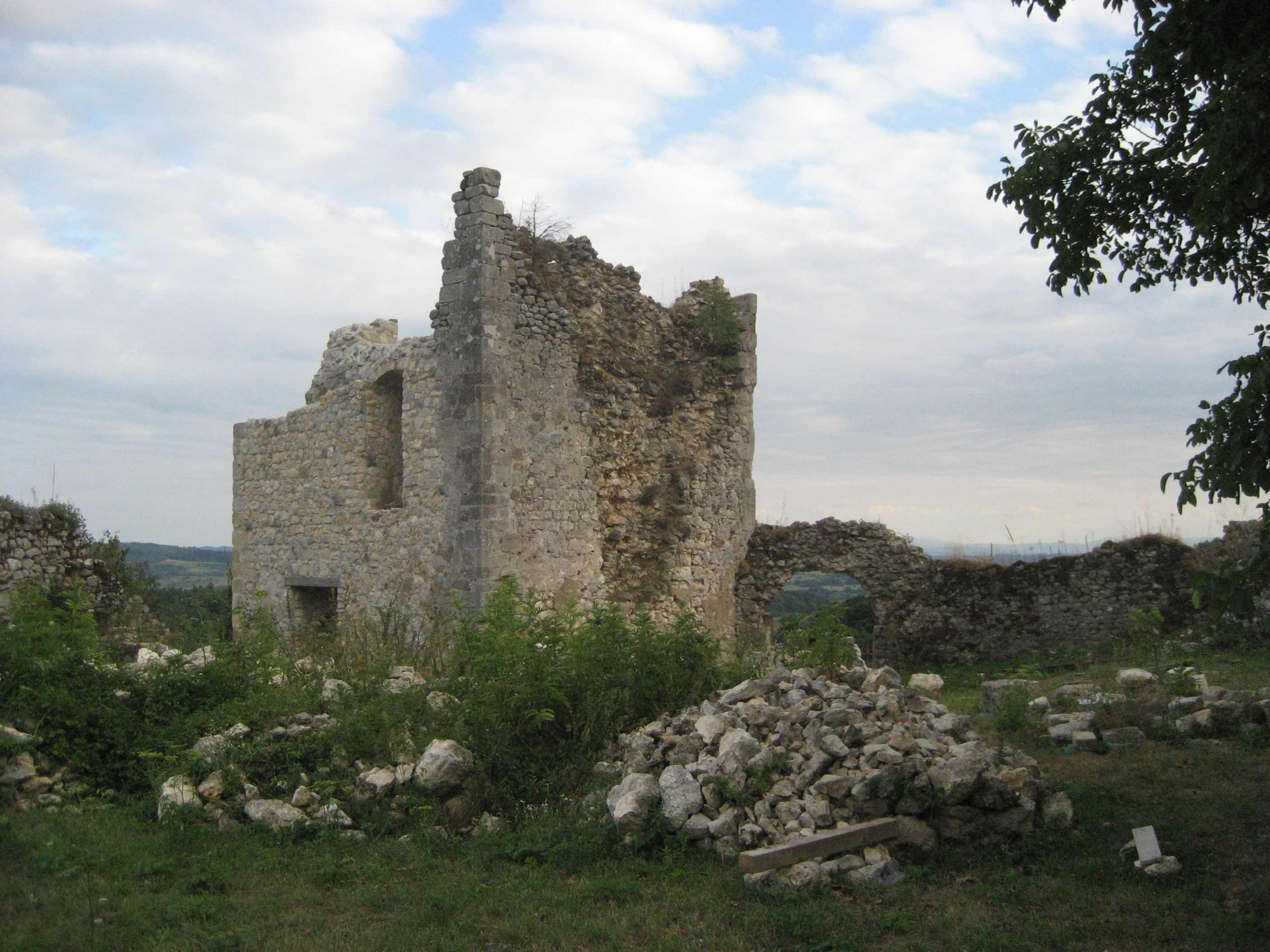
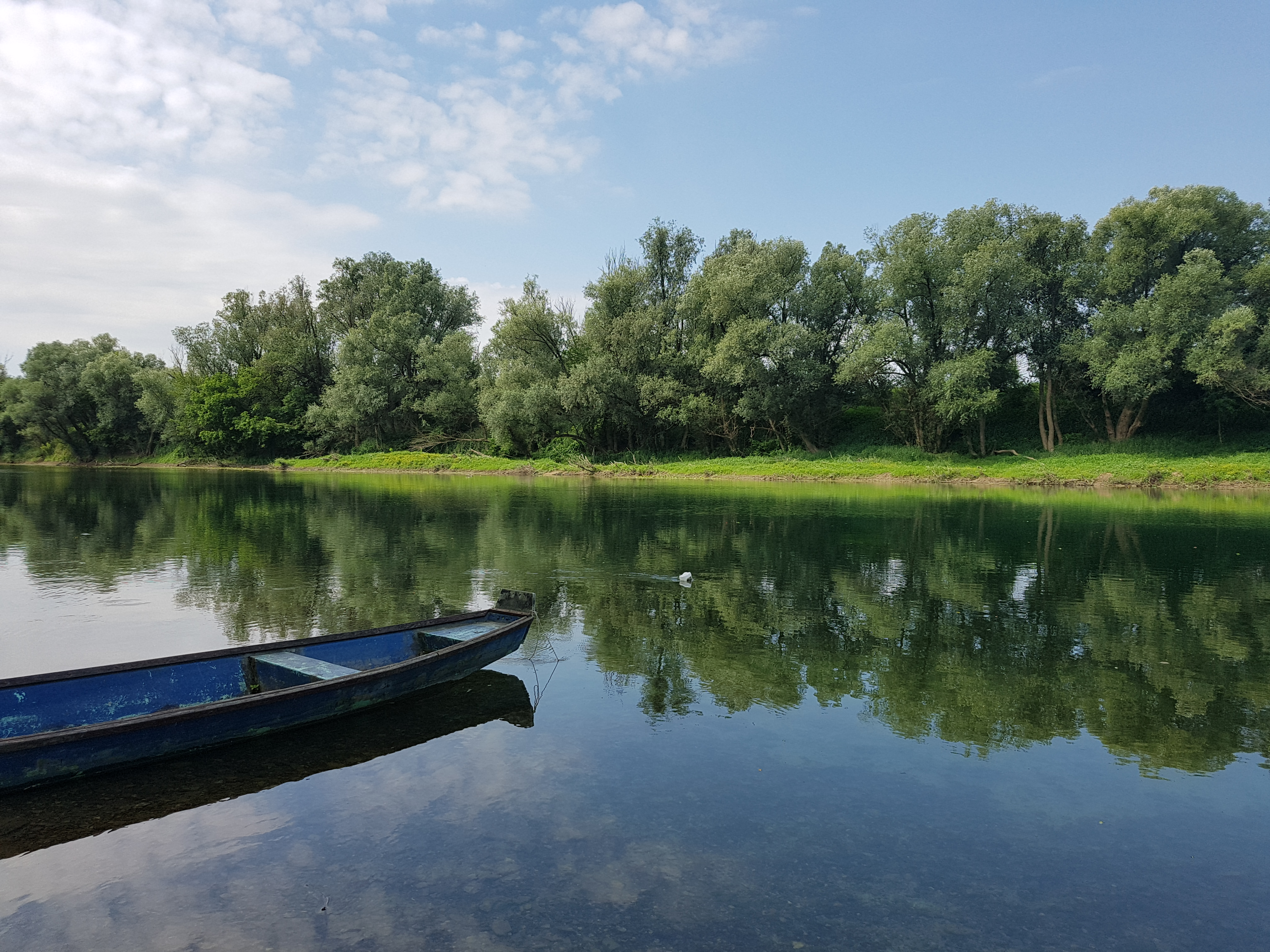
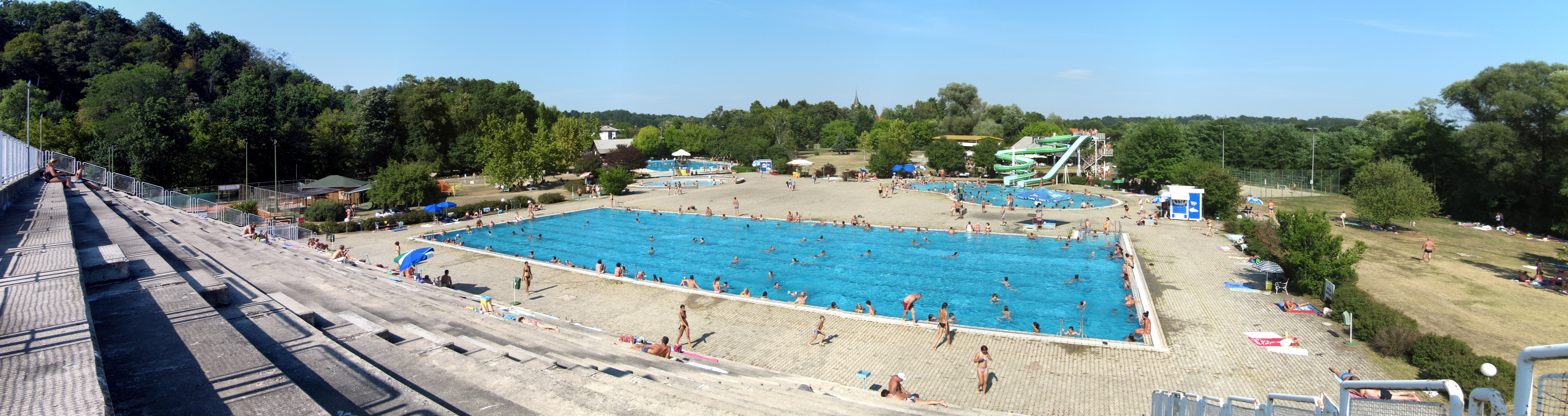

- Flag Coat of arms

- Sisak-Moslavina County within Croatia
- Country: Croatia
- County seat: Sisak

Government
  - Župan (Prefect): Ivan Celjak (HDZ)

Area
  - Total: 4,468 km^{2} (1,725 sq mi)

Population (2021)
  - Total: 139,603
  - Density: 31.25/km^{2} (80.92/sq mi)
- Area code: 044
- ISO 3166 code: HR-03
- HDI (2022): 0.844; Very high · 14th
- Website: www.smz.hr

Sisak-Moslavina County (Croatian: Sisačko-moslavačka županija) is a Croatian county in eastern Central Croatia and southwestern Slavonia. It is named after the city of Sisak and the region Moslavina just across the river Sava. According to the 2021 census, it is inhabited by 140,000 people.

This county contains the ancient Roman city of Siscia—today's Sisak. Siscia was the largest city of the region back then, a Pannonian capital, likely due to its position on the confluence of the Kupa and Sava rivers. The city's patron saint is its first Christian bishop, St. Kvirin, who was tortured and almost killed during Diocletian's persecution of Christians. Legend has it that they tied him to a millstone and threw him into a river, but he freed himself from the weight, escaped and continued to preach his faith.

The town may have lost importance with the fall of one empire, but it recovered it soon enough with the rise of another: Sisak became famous for crucial battles between European armies and the Ottoman Turks. In particular, the battle of 1593 when the Ottoman army first suffered a large defeat. The ban Toma Bakač Erdedi who led the defense in this battle became famous throughout Europe.

Today, Sisak features the largest Croatian metallurgic factory (supported by the University of Zagreb's Faculty of Metallurgy also in the city) and the largest oil refinery. These are coupled with the petrochemical facilities in the nearby town of Kutina, the first recorded mention of which was in 1256 by king Béla IV. Moslavina is probably the most picturesque part of this county, with the natural park Lonjsko polje near the rivers Lonja, Ilova and Pakra.

This county also extends far to the south, bordering Bosnia. In this southern part of the county, one can find the small town of Topusko, which boasts one of the spas typical of Central Croatia, although this its seniority stands out as it dates back to the Neolithic age.

Sisak-Moslavina County borders Karlovac County in the west, Zagreb County in the north, Bjelovar-Bilogora County and Požega-Slavonia County in the northeast, and Brod-Posavina County in the east.

== Administrative division ==
Sisak-Moslavina county is subdivided as follows:

- City of Sisak (county seat)
- Town of Glina
- Town of Hrvatska Kostajnica
- Town of Kutina
- Town of Novska
- Town of Petrinja
- Town of Popovača
- Municipality of Donji Kukuruzari
- Municipality of Dvor
- Municipality of Gvozd
- Municipality of Hrvatska Dubica
- Municipality of Jasenovac
- Municipality of Lekenik
- Municipality of Lipovljani
- Municipality of Majur
- Municipality of Martinska Ves
- Municipality of Sunja
- Municipality of Topusko
- Municipality of Velika Ludina

== Demographics ==
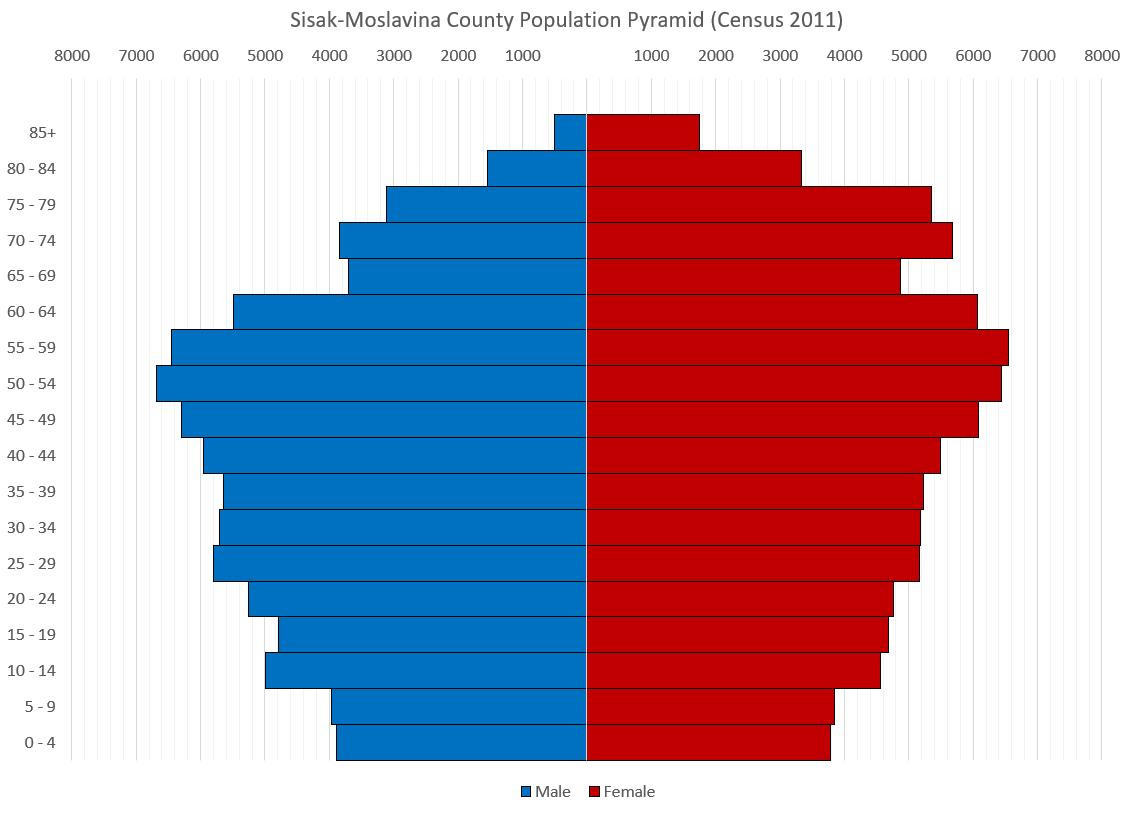
Population pyramid of Sisak-Moslavina County per 2011 Census.

Historical populations of Sisak-Moslavina County

Year	Pop.	±%
1857	168,292	—
1869	182,656	+8.5%
1880	186,059	+1.9%
1890	215,675	+15.9%
1900	235,514	+9.2%
1910	256,207	+8.8%
1921	248,953	−2.8%
1931	268,287	+7.8%
1948	234,953	−12.4%

Year	Pop.	±%
1953	247,482	+5.3%
1961	255,635	+3.3%
1971	258,643	+1.2%
1981	255,292	−1.3%
1991	251,332	−1.6%
2001	185,387	−26.2%
2011	172,439	−7.0%
2021	139,603	−19.0%

Source: Naselja i stanovništvo Republike Hrvatske 1857–2001, Croatian Bureau of Statistics, Zagreb, 2005

As of the 2021 census, the county had 140,549 residents. The population density is 31 people per km^{2}.

Sisak-Moslavina County: Population trends 1857–2021
v

population	168292	182656	186059	215675	235514	256207	248953	268287	234953	247482	255635	258643	255292	251332	185387	172439	140549
	1857	1869	1880	1890	1900	1910	1921	1931	1948	1953	1961	1971	1981	1991	2001	2011	2021

Sources: Croatian Bureau of Statistics publications

Croats form the majority with 82.4% of the population, followed by ethnic Serbs at 12.2%.

== Politics ==
=== Minority councils and representatives ===
Directly elected minority councils and representatives are tasked with consulting tasks for the local or regional authorities in which they are advocating for minority rights and interests, integration into public life and participation in the management of local affairs. At the 2023 Croatian national minorities councils and representatives elections Bosniaks, Roma and Serbs of Croatia all fulfilled legal requirements to elect their own 25-member minority councils of the Sisak-Moslavina County while Czechs, Slovaks, Italians and Ukrainians of Croatia were electing individual representatives with representative of the Albanians of Croatia remaining unelected due to the absence of candidatures. Some municipalities, towns or cities in the county elected their own local minority councils as well.

== See also ==
- Roman Catholic Diocese of Sisak
- Serbian Orthodox Eparchy of Gornji Karlovac
- Serbian Orthodox Eparchy of Slavonia
