= Natural and Cultural Heritage of Croatia =

The natural and cultural heritage of Croatia (Croatian: Prirodna i kulturna baština Republike Hrvatske) comprises sites, monuments, goods and species of particular importance to the Republic of Croatia which are protected by national law. The Croatian constitution states that the protection of natural and cultural heritage, as well as their use needs to be regulated according to the constitution and laws of the Republic of Croatia (art. 2).

== Natural heritage ==
As regards nature protection, the Croatian constitution states:

Article 3

The protection of nature and the human environment belong among others to the highest values of the constitutional rights of the Republic of Croatia and are a foundation for interpreting the constitution.

Očuvanje prirode i čovjekova okoliša između ostalih najviše su vrednote ustavnog poretka Republike Hrvatske i temelj za tumačenje Ustava.

Furthermore, the constitution states:

Article 52

The sea, the coast and islands, waters, airspace, mining resources and other natural treasures, but also land property, woods, plants and animals, other parts of nature, immovable property and items of particular cultural, historic, economic and ecologic significance, which are of interest for the Republic of Croatia according to law, have its particular protection.

More, morska obala i otoci, vode, zračni prostor, rudno blago i druga prirodna bogatstva, ali i zemljište, šume, biljni i životinjski svijet, drugi dijelovi prirode, nekretnine i stvari od osobitog kulturnoga, povijesnog, gospodarskog i ekološkog značenja, za koje je zakonom određeno da su od interesa za Republiku Hrvatsku, imaju njezinu osobitu zaštitu.

The Croatian State Institute for Nature Protection (Croatian Državni zavod za zaštitu prirode, DZZP) was the responsible state body for nature protection. It has been established by governmental decree in 2002 (NN 126/02). According to the Nature Protection Act (Croatian Zakon o zaštiti prirode) professional state tasks regarding nature protection are carried out by the institute (NN 70/05 i 139/08).

Within the Croatian Ministry of Culture (Croatian Ministarstvo kulture) the Administration for Nature Protection (Croatian Uprava za zaštitu prirode Ministarstva kulture) has been established, which holds the Register of Protected Natural Values (Croatian Upisnik zaštićenih prirodnih vrijednosti). Protected natural monuments are marked as spomenik prirode in Croatian.

The Nature Protection Act (NN 70/05 and 139/08) stipulates nine categories of protected areas. The national categories largely correspond to the internationally recognized IUCN protected area categories.

== Cultural heritage ==
The Croatian Ministry of Culture is the only body responsible for the protection of cultural monuments (Croatian spomenik kulture). According to the Act on the protection and preservation of cultural goods of 1999 (Croatian Zakon o zaštiti i očuvanju kulturnih dobara) a Register of Cultural Goods has been established (Croatian Registar kulturnih dobara Republike Hrvatske) (art. 14, NN 69/99).

The register contains the following lists:

- List of protected cultural goods (Lista zaštićenih kulturnih dobara)
- List of cultural goods of national significance (Lista kulturnih dobara nacionalnog značenja)
- List of preventively protected goods (Lista preventivno zaštićenih dobara)

== See also ==
- World Heritage Sites in Croatia
- Croatian art
- Culture of Croatia
- Protected areas of Croatia
