= Bijela (Pakra) =

River in Požega-Slavonia County, Croatia

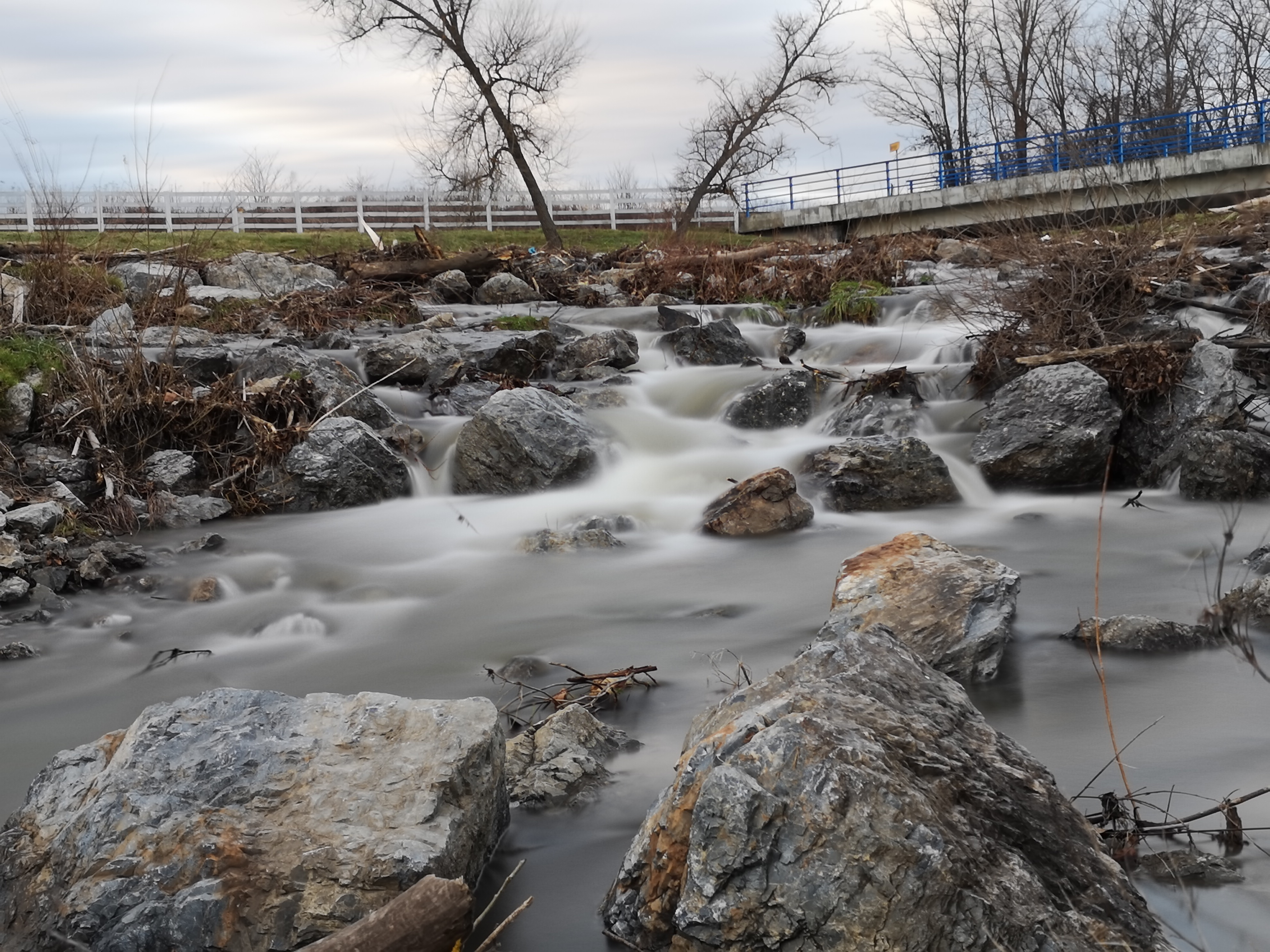
- Bijela River at the village of Badljevina

Location
- Country: Croatia
- City: Pakrac

Physical characteristics
- Source: in Ravna Gora mountain
  - location: Novo Zvečevo, Požega-Slavonia County, Croatia
  - coordinates: 45°32′37″N 17°31′04″E
  - elevation: ~ 550 m
- Mouth: Pakra near Poljana, Požega-Slavonia County, Croatia
  - location: Croatia
  - coordinates: 45.45568°N 16.99538°E
- Length: 59 km (37 mi)

Basin features
- River system: Danube basin
- Tributaries
  - left: brooks Željnjak, Brekinska, Miletina rijeka, Koritska rijeka
  - right: brook Orlovac

The Bijela is a river in central Croatia, a right tributary of the Pakra River. It is one of the biggest rivers in western Slavonia, flowing from east to west and enabling formation of fertile fields on its way.

== History ==
In the Middle Ages, the area of the Bijela was owned mostly by the Tibold noble family, while in the mid-16th century it was conquered by the Ottoman Empire. After the liberation in 1699, it became part of the Kingdom of Slavonia within the Habsburg monarchy.

== Geography and hydrography ==
The river is around 59 kilometres (37 mi) long. It has its source in Ravna Gora mountain near the village of Novo Zvečevo in the vicinity the Papuk Geopark area in western Slavonia. The upper course of the river flows westwards, then turns near the village of Kapetanovo Polje to the southwest, finally mouthing into the Pakra near the village of Poljana.

Throughout its course, the Bijela receives the waters of many tributaries, like Željnjak, Brekinska, Miletina rijeka, Koritska rijeka and Orlovac. For smaller vessels, it is navigable for much of its lowland flow.

The Bijela is an important source of public water supplies, as well as for recreational use. It is known for its recreational fishing, i. e. sport fishing. The most represented fishes in it are brown trout, common carp and grass carp. There are also several nearby fish ponds (like Pjeskara, Raminac or Uljanik) in the Bijela-Pakra area, available for sport fishing, but also for very significant commercial fishing (Ribnjak Poljana).

== See also ==
- List of rivers of Croatia
- Ilova (Sava)
- Sirač
