= Kamešnica (river) =

Location
- Country: Croatia

Physical characteristics
- Mouth
  - location: Črnec
  - coordinates: 46.0050°N 16.4545°E
- Length: 38 km (24 mi)

Basin features
- Progression: Črnec→ Glogovnica→ Česma→ Lonja→ Sava→ Danube→ Black Sea

Kamešnica is a river in northern Croatia, a left tributary of the Črnec. It is 38 kilometres (24 mi) long.

Kamešnica rises on the southern slopes of Kalnik near the eponymous village of Kamešnica. It flows to the southwest, passes west of Križevci and flows into the Črnec near the village Erdovec, part of Križevci.
