= Črnec (Glogovnica) =

Coordinates: 45°51′23″N 16°28′58″E

Črnec is a river in Croatia, a tributary of the Glogovnica, monitored by the government as it is longer than 20 km (12 mi).

Črnec rises on the slopes of the Kalnik near Vojnovec Kalnički and flows southward. After it passes Selnica Miholečka it receives the Reka from the right and near Miholec it receives Klenovec from the left. Near Gregurovec it receives the Vranča from the right, and after Srednji Dubovec it receives the Kamešnica from the left. Near Potočec it receives the Velika from the right, and soon flows into the Glogovnica near Koritna.
