= Gregurovec =

Gregurovec may refer to several villages in Croatia:

- Gregurovec, Krapinske Toplice, a village near Krapinske Toplice, Krapina-Zagorje County
- Gregurovec, Mihovljan, a village near Mihovljan, Krapina-Zagorje County
- Gregurovec, Sveti Petar Orehovec in the Koprivnica-Križevci County
