= List of protected areas of Croatia =

The main protected areas of Croatia are national parks, nature parks and strict reserves. There are 411 protected areas of Croatia, encompassing 9% of the country. Those include 8 national parks, 2 strict reserves and 13 nature parks. The most famous protected area and the oldest national park in Croatia is the Plitvice Lakes National Park, a UNESCO World Heritage Site. Velebit Nature Park is a part of the UNESCO Man and the Biosphere Programme. The strict and special reserves, as well as the national and nature parks, are managed and protected by the central government, while other protected areas are managed by counties. In 2005, the National Ecological Network was set up, as the first step in preparation of the EU accession and joining of the Natura 2000 network.

The total area of all national parks in the country is 930 km^{2} (359 sq mi), of which 235 km^{2} (91 sq mi) is sea surface. Each of the national parks is maintained by a separate institution, overseen and funded by the government ministry overseeing nature conservation. Ministry of Environmental Protection and Green Transition provides centralized oversight, expertise and management of the Register of Protected Natural Values of Croatia, the work done in the past by the State Institute for Nature Protection.

== National parks ==
All eight national parks are located in karst area.

#	Name	Image	Area	Website	Established in
1	Plitvice Lakes		296.9 km^{2} (114.6 sq mi)	NP Plitvička jezera	1949
2	Paklenica		95.0 km^{2} (36.7 sq mi)	NP Paklenica	1949
3	Risnjak		63.5 km^{2} (24.5 sq mi)	NP Risnjak	1953
4	Mljet		53 km^{2} (20 sq mi)	NP Mljet	1960
5	Kornati		217.0 km^{2} (83.8 sq mi)	NP Kornati	1980
6	Brijuni		33.9 km^{2} (13.1 sq mi)	NP Brijuni	1983
7	Krka		109.0 km^{2} (42.1 sq mi)	NP Krka	1985
8	Sjeverni Velebit		109.0 km^{2} (42.1 sq mi)	NP Sjeverni velebit	1999

== Nature parks ==
#	Name	Image	Area	Website	Established in
1	Kopački Rit		231.0 km^{2} (89.2 sq mi)	PP Kopački rit	1967
2	Medvednica		179.4 km^{2} (69.3 sq mi)	PP Medvednica	1981
3	Velebit		2,270.0 km^{2} (876.5 sq mi)	PP Velebit	1981
4	Biokovo		193.0 km^{2} (74.5 sq mi)	PP Biokovo	1981
5	Telašćica		70.5 km^{2} (27.2 sq mi)	PP Telašćica	1988
6	Lonjsko Polje		506.5 km^{2} (195.6 sq mi)	PP Lonjsko polje	1990
7	Žumberak-Samoborsko gorje		217 km^{2} (84 sq mi)	PP Žumberak samoborsko gorje	1999
8	Učka		160.0 km^{2} (61.8 sq mi)	PP Učka	1999
9	Papuk		336.0 km^{2} (129.7 sq mi)	PP Papuk	1999
10	Vrana lake		57.0 km^{2} (22.0 sq mi)	PP Vransko jezero	1999
11	Lastovsko otočje		196.0 km^{2} (75.7 sq mi)	PP Lastovo	2006
12	Dinara		630.5 km^{2} (243.4 sq mi)	PP Dinara	2021
13	Zagorske gore		300.9 km^{2} (116.2 sq mi)		2026

== Strict reserves ==
- Bijele and Samarske stijene
- Hajdučki and Rožanski kukovi

== Special reserves ==
There are 80 special reserves in Croatia:

- 37 forest vegetation reserves
- 22 ornithological reserves
- 9 botanical reserves
- 2 ichthyological reserves
- 2 ichthyological and ornithological reserves
- 2 zoological reserves
- 2 sea reserves
- 1 geological and paleontological reserve
- 1 paleontological reserve
- 1 geographical and botanical reserve
- 1 botanical and zoological reserve

== See also ==
- Register of Protected Natural Values of Croatia
- Natural and Cultural Heritage of Croatia
- List of World Heritage Sites in Croatia
