= Kamešnica =

Kamešnica may refer to:

- Kamešnica (mountain), on the border of Bosnia and Croatia
- Kamešnica (river), a right tributary of Glogovnica in central Croatia
- Kamešnica, Koprivnica-Križevci County, a village near Kalnik, Croatia
- Kamešnica (Sjenica), a village in Serbia
