= List of World Heritage Sites in Croatia =

World Heritage Sites in Croatia. Red dots mark cultural and green dots mark natural sites.

The United Nations Educational, Scientific and Cultural Organization (UNESCO) World Heritage Sites are places of importance to cultural or natural heritage as described in the UNESCO World Heritage Convention, established in 1972. Cultural heritage consists of monuments (such as architectural works, monumental sculptures, or inscriptions), groups of buildings, and sites (including archaeological sites). Natural features (consisting of physical and biological formations), geological and physiographical formations (including habitats of threatened species of animals and plants), and natural sites which are important from the point of view of science, conservation, or natural beauty are defined as natural heritage. Croatia, following its declaration of independence from Yugoslavia on 25 June 1991, succeeded the convention on 6 July 1992.

Croatia has ten sites on the list and a further 15 sites on the tentative list. The first three sites, Historical Complex of Split with the Palace of Diocletian, Dubrovnik, and Plitvice Lakes National Park, were inscribed to the list at the 3rd UNESCO session in 1979, when the country was still a part of Yugoslavia. In total, there are eight cultural and two natural sites, as determined by the organization's selection criteria. Three of the sites are shared with other countries.

During the Croatian War of Independence, following the breakup of Yugoslavia, military confrontations took place in Dubrovnik (Siege of Dubrovnik) and in the Plitvice Lakes area. Extensive artillery damage in Dubrovnik and landmines laid around Plitvice resulted in the two sites being listed as endangered in 1991. Following their restoration, Plitvice and Dubrovnik were removed from the list of endangered sites in 1997 and 1998, respectively. Although Croatia's World Heritage Sites generate large numbers of visitors, new threats are emerging due to the detrimental effects of uncontrolled mass tourism.

== World Heritage Sites ==
UNESCO lists sites under ten criteria; each entry must meet at least one of the criteria. Criteria i through vi are cultural, and vii through x are natural.

* Transnational site

Site	Image	Location	Year listed	UNESCO data	Description
Plitvice Lakes National Park	A series of waterfalls cascading over vegetation-covered slopes	Plitvička Jezera	1979	98; vii, viii, ix (natural)	Over time, water has flowed over the natural limestone and chalk, creating natural dams which in turn have created a series of connecting lakes, waterfalls, and caves. The nearby forests are home to bears, wolves, and many rare bird species.
Historical Complex of Diocletian's Palace	Tourists visiting the remains of a Roman palace.	Split	1979	97; ii, iii, iv (cultural)	The palace was built by the Roman emperor Diocletian at the turn of the fourth century AD, and later served as the basis of the city of Split. A cathedral was built in the Middle Ages inside the ancient mausoleum, along with churches, fortifications, Gothic and Renaissance palaces. The Baroque style makes up the rest of the area.
Old City of Dubrovnik	A view of Dubrovnik from the coast, showing defensive walls and a marina	Dubrovnik	1979	95; i, iii, iv (cultural)	Dubrovnik became a prosperous Maritime Republic during the Middle Ages, it became the only eastern Adriatic city-state to rival Venice. Supported by its wealth and skilled diplomacy, the city achieved a remarkable level of development, particularly during the 15th and 16th centuries.
Episcopal Complex of the Euphrasian Basilica in the Historic Centre of Poreč	Interior of a basilica with elaborate mosaics	Poreč	1997	809; ii, iv (cultural)	The episcopal complex, with its striking mosaics dating back to the 6th century, is one of the best examples of early Byzantine art and architecture in the Mediterranean region and the world. It includes the basilica itself, a sacristy, a baptistery, and the bell tower of the nearby archbishop's palace.
Historic city of Trogir		Trogir	1997	810; ii, iv (cultural)	Trogir's rich culture was created under the influence of old Greeks, Romans, and Venetians. It is the best-preserved Romanesque-Gothic complex not only in the Adriatic, but in all of Central Europe. Trogir's medieval core, surrounded by walls, comprises a preserved castle and tower and a series of dwellings and palaces from the Romanesque, Gothic, Renaissance, and Baroque periods.
Cathedral of St. James		Šibenik	2000	963; i, ii, iv (cultural)	The cathedral is a triple-nave basilica with three apses and a dome (32 metres (105 ft) high inside) and is also one of the most important Renaissance architectural monuments in the eastern Adriatic.
Stari Grad Plain		Hvar	2008	1240; ii, iii, v (cultural)	The Stari Grad Plain is an agricultural landscape that was set up by the ancient Greek colonists in the 4th century BC, and remains in use today. The plain is generally still in its original form. The ancient layout has been preserved by careful maintenance of the stone walls over 24 centuries.
Stećci Medieval Tombstones Graveyards*		Dubravka, Cista Velika	2016	1504; iii, vi (cultural)	Stećci (sing. stećak) or the medieval tombstones are the monolith stone monuments found in the regions of the present Bosnia and Herzegovina, parts of Croatia, Serbia, and Montenegro. They first appeared in the 12th century and reached their peak in the 14th and 15th century. There are two sites inscribed in Croatia, in Dubravka and in Cista Velika.
Venetian Works of defence between 15th and 17th centuries*		Zadar, Šibenik	2017	1533; iii, iv (cultural)	This property consists of six components of defence works in Italy, Croatia, and Montenegro, spanning more than 1,000 kilometres between the Lombard region of Italy and the eastern Adriatic Coast. The introduction of gunpowder led to significant shifts in military techniques and architecture. Croatian sites include the defensive system of Zadar and St. Nicholas Fortress in Šibenik.
Primeval Beech Forests of the Carpathians and Other Regions of Europe*		Paklenica, Northern Velebit National Park	2017	1133; ix (natural)	This transboundary site (shared with Albania, Austria, Belgium, Bulgaria, Germany, Italy, Poland, Romania, Slovakia, Slovenia, Spain, and Ukraine) encompasses the isolated refuges from which the European beech has spread across the continent since the end of the last Ice Age. This successful expansion is related to the tree's flexibility and tolerance of different climatic, geographical and physical conditions.

== Tentative list ==
In addition to the sites inscribed on the World Heritage list, member states can maintain a list of tentative sites that they may consider for nomination. Nominations for the World Heritage list are only accepted if the site was previously listed on the tentative list. As of 2021, Croatia recorded fifteen sites on its tentative list.

Site	Image	Location	Year listed	UNESCO criteria	Description
Zadar – Episcopal complex		Zadar County	2005	i, ii, iii, iv, vi (cultural)	The site encompasses the Romanesque Zadar Cathedral, Church of St. Donatus from the 9th century, the archbishop's palace, and other buildings. Originally a Liburnian settlement and later a Roman colony, Zadar still preserves its Roman forum and street plan.
Historical-town planning ensemble of Ston with Mali Ston, connecting walls, the Mali Ston Bay nature reserve, Stonsko Polje and the salt pans		Ston	2005	i, iii, iv, v (cultural)	Ston was a major fort of the Republic of Ragusa. The area of this cultural property includes urban ensembles developed in accordance with the configuration of the ground and the preserved parts of the outstanding natural environment.
Historical-Town Planning Ensemble of Tvrđa		Osijek	2005	i, iv, vi (cultural)	Tvrđa, a Habsburg star fort, contains the best-preserved and largest ensemble of Baroque buildings in Croatia and has been described as a unique example of an 18th-century baroque military, administrative, and commercial urban center.
Historic Nucleus and Old Town (the Castle)		Varaždin	2005	i, iii, iv, vi (cultural)	The city nucleus represents an ensemble of medieval-renaissance-baroque buildings. For a brief period in the 18th century, Varaždin was the capital of Croatia.
Castle of Veliki Tabor		Krapina-Zagorje County	2005	iv (cultural)	The castle, built in the 15th and 16th centuries, combines features of late Gothic and Renaissance architecture.
Lonjsko Polje Nature Park		Sisak-Moslavina County	2005	(mixed)	The largest protected wetland in the Danube basin is an important habitat for birds and other animals. Large pasture lands have remained preserved to the present for indigenous livestock species found in this region.
Velebit Mountain		Lika-Senj County and Zadar County	2005	vii, viii, ix, x (natural)	The largest mountain massive in Croatia, exhibiting a wide range of karst landforms.
Diocletian's Palace and the Historical Nucleus of Split (extension)		Split	2005	i, ii, iii, iv, v (cultural)	Extension to the existing World Heritage Site, to include additional sites, including the Diocletian Aqueduct.
Lubenice		Lubenice, Primorje-Gorski Kotar County	2005	v (cultural)	A village at a strategic location on the island of Cres, inhabited since the prehistoric era.
Primošten Vineyards		Primošten	2007	v, vi (cultural)	The Primošten vineyards represent a materialized traditional form of cultivating a specific kind of Mediterranean soil.
Hermitage Blaca		Brač island	2007	ii, v (cultural)	The hermitage established in the 16th century by Glagolitic monks.
City of Motovun		Motovun	2007	ii, iv (cultural)	A medieval town, developed from a prehistoric hill fort, that has preserved its medieval characteristics.
The historic town of Korčula		Korčula	2007	ii, iii, iv, v (cultural)	A historic fortified town on the protected east coast of the island of Korčula.
Kornati National Park and Telašćica Nature Park		Šibenik-Knin County and Zadar County	2007	vii, viii, x (natural)	An isolated archipelago, exhibiting a wide range of Karst landforms, and an important protected area for marine wildlife.
Frontiers of the Roman Empire – The Danube Limes (Croatia)*		several sites along the Danube River	2020	ii, iii, iv (cultural)	The Croatian part of the Danubian Limes was secured by forts and watchtowers, connected by military roads. There are 23 individual sites listed in this nomination. The nomination is shared with Serbia, Romania, and Bulgaria.

== See also ==
- List of Intangible Cultural Heritage elements in Croatia
- List of protected areas of Croatia
- Register of Protected Natural Values of Croatia
- Register of Cultural Goods of Croatia
