= List of prefects of Sisak-Moslavina County =

This is a list of prefects of Sisak-Moslavina County.

== Prefects of Sisak-Moslavina County (1993–present) ==
Croatian Democratic Union (HDZ)
Social Democratic Party of Croatia (SDP)

№	Portrait	Name (Born–Died)	Term of Office		Party
1		Đuro Brodarac (1944–2011)	4 May 1993	20 June 2005	HDZ
2		Marina Lovrić Merzel (1963–)	20 June 2005	4 April 2014	SDP
–		Zdenko Vahovec (Acting)	4 April 2014	4 November 2014	SDP
3		Ivo Žinić (1960–)	4 November 2014	8 June 2021	HDZ
4		Ivan Celjak (1983–)	8 June 2021	Incumbent	HDZ

== See also ==
- Sisak-Moslavina County
