= Velika Ludina =

- Municipality
- Općina Velika Ludina; Municipality of Velika Ludina
- Location of Velika Ludina in Croatia
- Coordinates: 45°36′N 16°36′E
- Country: Croatia
- County: Sisak-Moslavina County

Area
  - Municipality: 102.9 km^{2} (39.7 sq mi)
  - Urban: 6.7 km^{2} (2.6 sq mi)

Population (2021)
  - Municipality: 2,283
  - Density: 22.19/km^{2} (57.46/sq mi)
  - Urban: 697
  - Urban density: 100/km^{2} (270/sq mi)
- Website: opcina-vludina.hr

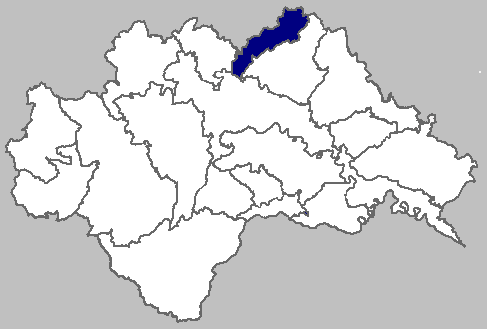
Image of Velika Ludina municipality within Sisak-Moslavina County

Velika Ludina is a village and a municipality in the Sisak-Moslavina County of Croatia.

In the 2011 census, it had a total population of 2,625, in the following settlements:

- Gornja Vlahinićka, population 271
- Grabričina, population 40
- Grabrov Potok, population 104
- Katoličko Selišće, population 156
- Kompator, population 80
- Ludinica, population 14
- Mala Ludina, population 159
- Mustafina Klada, population 164
- Okoli, population 278
- Ruškovica, population 56
- Velika Ludina, population 751
- Vidrenjak, population 552

In the same census, 98.06% of the population were Croats.

== Politics ==
=== Minority councils and representatives ===
Directly elected minority councils and representatives are tasked with consulting tasks for the local or regional authorities in which they are advocating for minority rights and interests, integration into public life and participation in the management of local affairs. At the 2023 Croatian national minorities councils and representatives elections Romani people in Croatia fulfilled legal requirements to elect 10 members minority council of the Municipality of Velika Ludina but the elections were not organized due to absence of candidatures.
