= Pakra =

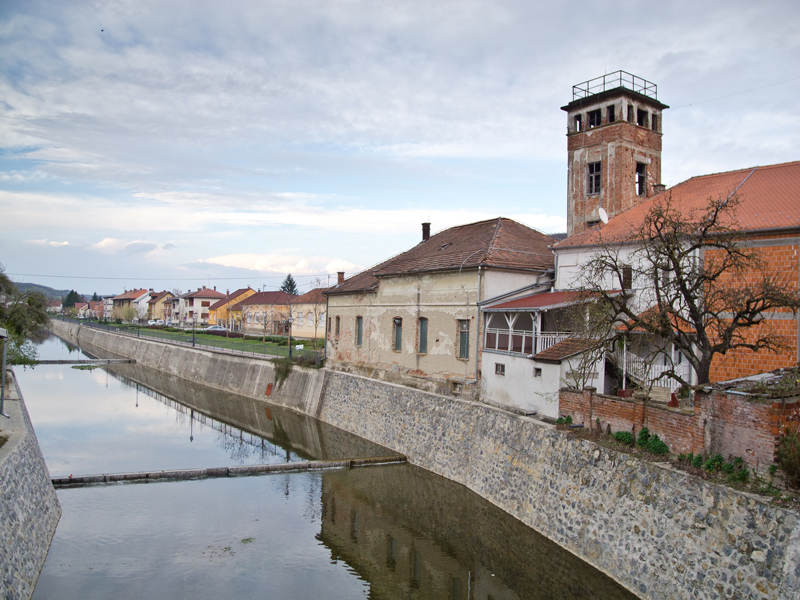

Location
- Country: Croatia

Physical characteristics
- Mouth
  - location: Ilova
  - coordinates: 45°23′55″N 16°45′54″E

Basin features
- Progression: Ilova→ Sava→ Danube→ Black Sea

The Pakra is a river in western Slavonia and central Croatia, a left tributary of the Ilova. It is around 72 kilometres (45 mi) long.

The Pakra rises in the south of Ravna Gora, north of the village of Bučje. It flows towards the west and passes through Pakrac, where a southward bend takes it through Lipik. It continues to the west and passes Banova Jaruga, where a canal connects it to the Ilova. It flows southwest into the system of canals in Lonjsko polje through which Ilova, Kutina and Lonja-Trebež flow into the Sava.

Several tributaries join the river, including Braneška rijeka, Kopanjica, Sivornica, Rakovac, Brusnica and Bijela.

== Sources ==
- Stanko Andrić (September 2005). "Benediktinska opatija svete Margarete u Grabovu i njezin odnos prema benediktinskom samostanu u Bijeli". Scrinia Slavonica (in Croatian). 5 (1): 69. "Taj južniji vodotok, Pekrec ili današnja Pakra, izvire na južnoj strani Ravne gore ispod vrha Metla i teče također uglavnom na zapad, izmeðu Ravne gore i Pakračke gore na sjeveru i pristranaka Psunja na jugu, pokraj Dragovića, kroz Pakrac i Lipik, a otud ravnijim predjelom prema Savi."
- Čanjevac, Ivan; Pavlek, Katarina; Orešić, Danijel (2022). "River lengths in Croatia determined from a topographic map at a scale of 1:25,000". Croatian Geographical Bulletin. 84 (1).
