= Zelina (river) =

Physical characteristics
- Mouth: Lonja
  - coordinates: 45°49′21″N 16°21′52″E

Zelina is a river in Croatia, monitored by the government as it is longer than 20 km (12 mi). It is a right tributary of Lonja, rising on the eastern slopes of Medvednica near Sveti Ivan Zelina and flowing southwards, before turning to the east just north of Martin breg, and flowing into the Lonja near Kusanovec.
