= Ilova (Sava) =

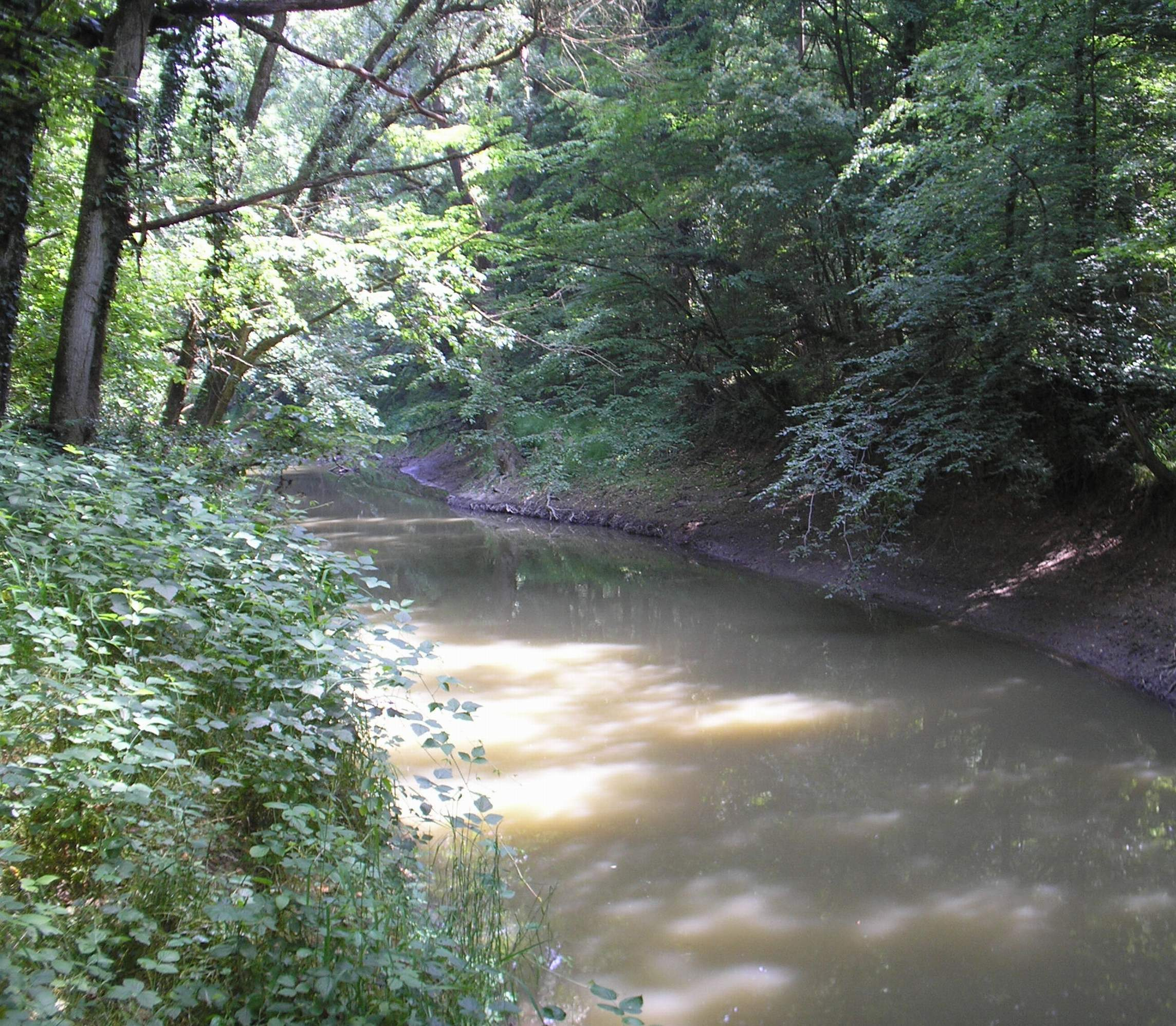

Location
- Country: Croatia

Physical characteristics
- Mouth
  - location: Sava
  - coordinates: 45°20′56″N 16°46′21″E
- Length: 104.6 km (65.0 mi)
- Basin size: 1,796 km^{2} (693 sq mi)

Basin features
- Progression: Sava→ Danube→ Black Sea

The Ilova is a river in central Croatia, a left tributary of the Sava. It is 104.6 kilometres (65.0 mi) long and its basin covers an area of 1,796 square kilometres (693 sq mi).

The Ilova rises in the hilly areas of eastern Bilogora, south of Virovitica and Suhopolje, and flows towards the southwest, forming a series of lakes near Veliki Zdenci. It turns to the south near Garešnica, where there are another set of lakes at the confluence with the river Toplica that rises in Papuk, and the river Garešnica which rises in the Moslavačka gora. It then turns westward to pass near the eponymous village of Ilova south of Kutina. A canal connects it to the Pakra near Banova Jaruga.

Near the end of its natural length, it flows into a 4.25 km (2.64 mi) long canal that connects it with the Kutina, the Lonja-Trebež and ultimately the Sava, in the eastern part of Lonjsko Polje nature park. It used to flow into the Trebež in the 1970s, but after Lonja was diverted into the Sava with its own canal, now the Ilova canal feeds a separate lower section of Trebež, about 3 km downstream from the mouth of the old Lonja into the Sava.

== Sources ==
- Čanjevac, Ivan; Pavlek, Katarina; Orešić, Danijel (2022). "River lengths in Croatia determined from a topographic map at a scale of 1:25,000". Croatian Geographical Bulletin. 84 (1).
