= Poljana, Požega-Slavonia County =

Poljana
- Village
- Interactive map of Poljana
- Location within Croatia
- Country: Croatia
- County: Požega-Slavonia
- Town: Lipik

Area
  - Total: 12.5 km^{2} (4.8 sq mi)

Population (2021)
  - Total: 425
  - Density: 34.0/km^{2} (88.1/sq mi)
- Time zone: UTC+1 (CET)
  - Summer (DST): UTC+2 (CEST)

Poljana is a village near Lipik, Croatia.
