= Glogovnica =

Location
- Country: Croatia

Physical characteristics
- Mouth
  - location: Česma
  - coordinates: 45°44′59″N 16°35′52″E
- Length: 64.5 km (40.1 mi)
- Basin size: 1,302 km^{2} (503 sq mi)

Basin features
- Progression: Česma→ Lonja→ Sava→ Danube→ Black Sea

Glogovnica is a river in central Croatia, a right tributary of Česma. It is 64.5 kilometres (40.1 mi) long.

Glogovnica rises in the southeastern part of Kalnik near the village of Apatovac, and flows towards the south, passing east of the eponymous villages of Donja Glogovnica and Gornja Glogovnica, as well as the city of Križevci, turning slightly to the southwest. It passes near Gradec, where it becomes a series of man-made drainage canals and receives influx from the right tributary of Črnec. It then turns southeast and flows into the Česma west of Čazma.
