= Črnec (Lonja) =

Coordinates: 45°39′38″N 16°23′00″E

Črnec is a river in Croatia, a tributary of the Lonja-Strug canal, monitored by the government as it is longer than 20 km (12 mi).

It rises at the southern slopes of the Medvednica near Sesvetska Sela, and flows towards the southeast, passing through the eponymous village of Črnec Dugoselski. Afterwards its flow has been modified by humans and it reaches the Lonja near Posavski Bregi through the canal that connects it with the Sava.
