= Vojnovec Kalnički =

Coordinates: 46°07′15″N 16°25′25″E

- Village
- Interactive map of Vojnovec Kalnički
- Country: Croatia
- County: Koprivnica-Križevci County

Area
  - Total: 2.9 km^{2} (1.1 sq mi)

Population (2021)
  - Total: 112
  - Density: 39/km^{2} (100/sq mi)
- Time zone: UTC+1 (CET)
  - Summer (DST): UTC+2 (CEST)

Vojnovec Kalnički is a village in Croatia.
