= Register of Protected Natural Values of Croatia =

The Register of Protected Natural Values of the Republic of Croatia (Croatian: Upisnik zaštićenih prirodnih vrijednosti) has been created according to the Nature Protection Act (Croatian: Zakon o zaštiti prirode, OG 70/05 with subsequent amendments). The register is being administered by the Nature Protection Administration (Croatian: Uprava za zaštitu prirode) within the Ministry of Environmental Protection and Green Transition (Croatian: Ministarstvo zaštite okoliša i zelene tranzicije). The register serves as a reference database and unique official data source about protected areas in Croatia. The data in this register is public with the exception of special cases of confidentiality regarding the position of certain protected natural goods. The Nature Protection Act stipulates nine categories of protected areas.

According to the Register, Croatia has over 400 protected areas in various national categories, of which 12 are under preventive protection. The protected areas cover roughly 9% of the total state territory. The largest part of the protected surface are the nature parks (3.71% of the total state territory). In addition, as an EU member state, Croatia's Natura 2000 network covers over 36% of its land territory and 9% of its sea area. The national network includes 8 National Parks and 13 Nature Parks (the most recent being Dinara and Zagorske gore). Plitvice Lakes National Park remains a protected natural site added to the UNESCO World Heritage list.

== Constitution ==
The Croatian constitution stipulates that the protection of natural heritage needs to be regulated according to the constitution and laws of the Republic of Croatia (art. 2).

As regards nature protection, the Croatian constitution stipulates:

Article 3 The protection of nature and the human environment belong among others to the highest values of the constitutional rights of the Republic of Croatia and are a foundation for interpreting the constitution.

Očuvanje prirode i čovjekova okoliša između ostalih najviše su vrednote ustavnog poretka Republike Hrvatske i temelj za tumačenje Ustava.

Furthermore, the constitution stipulates:

Article 52

The sea, the coast and islands, waters, airspace, mining resources and other natural treasures, but also land property, woods, plants and animals, other parts of nature, immovable property and items of particular cultural, historic, economic and ecologic significance, which are of interest for the Republic of Croatia according to law, have its particular protection.

More, morska obala i otoci, vode, zračni prostor, rudno blago i druga prirodna bogatstva, ali i zemljište, šume, biljni i životinjski svijet, drugi dijelovi prirode, nekretnine i stvari od osobitog kulturnoga, povijesnog, gospodarskog i ekološkog značenja, za koje je zakonom određeno da su od interesa za Republiku Hrvatsku, imaju njezinu osobitu zaštitu.

== Institute for Environmental and Nature Protection ==
Specialized expert activities for nature protection are carried out by the Institute for Environmental and Nature Protection (Croatian: Zavod za zaštitu okoliša i prirode, formerly the Croatian State Institute for Nature Protection, DZZP, which later merged into the Croatian Agency for Environment and Nature, HAOP, before being integrated into the ministry). According to the Nature Protection Act (Croatian: Zakon o zaštiti prirode), the institute is centrally responsible for expert and analytical nature protection activities in Croatia.

== Protected area categories ==
The Nature Protection Act stipulates nine categories of protected areas. The national categories largely correspond to the internationally recognized IUCN protected area categories.

The table below lists the protected area category, the management level and the proclaiming body.

Protection category	Intent	Management level	Proclaiming body
STRICT RESERVE	Conserve intact nature, monitor the state of nature and education	county	Government of the Republic of Croatia
NATIONAL PARK	Conserve intact natural values, scientific, cultural, education and recreation intent	national	Croatian Parliament
SPECIAL RESERVE	Conservation due to its uniqueness, rarity or representativeness, and of particular scientific significance	county	Government of the Republic of Croatia
NATURE PARK	Protection of biological and landscape diversity, education, cultural, historical, tourism, recreation intent	national	Croatian Parliament
REGIONAL PARK	Protection of landscape diversity, sustainable development and tourism	county	County Assembly of City Assembly (City of Zagreb)
NATURE MONUMENT	Ecological, scientific, aesthetic or educational intent	county	County Assembly of City Assembly (City of Zagreb)
SIGNIFICANT LANDSCAPE	Conservation of landscape values and biological diversity, or cultural and historical values or landscape of preserve unique characteristics, and for rest and recreation	county	County Assembly of City Assembly (City of Zagreb)
PARK FOREST	Conservation of natural or planted forests of greater landscape value, rest and recreation	county	County Assembly of City Assembly (City of Zagreb)
PARK ARCHITECTURE MONUMENT	Conservation of artificially developed areas or trees having aesthetic, stylistic, artistic, cultural, historic, ecological or scientific values	county	County Assembly of City Assembly (City of Zagreb)

== Species ==
The biodiversity in Croatia is amongst the richest in all of Europe. The reason for this is the specific geographic position of Croatia at the crossing of four biogeographical regions, each of which is characterized by specific ecological, climatic and geomorphological properties. The great diversity of habitats in Croatia has resulted in a wealth of diversity of wild taxa (species and subspecies). Unfortunately, the exact number of wild taxa in Croatia is still unknown. To date, almost 40,000 taxa have been recorded. However, the actual number is estimated to be much higher, with estimates ranging from a minimum of 50,000 to over 100,000.

The Register contains 817 protected and 2,307 strictly protected wild and domesticated taxa. For particularly protected species the Red List of Plants and Animals of the Republic of Croatia has been created. There are more than 100 species that are listed on the European IUCN Red List of endangered species.

== See also ==
- Protected areas of Croatia
- World Heritage Sites in Croatia
