= Toplica (Ilova) =

River in Croatia

Location
- Country: Croatia

Physical characteristics
- Source
  - location: Papuk
  - coordinates: 45.6059558°N 17.3900117°E
- Mouth
  - location: Ilova
  - coordinates: 45.5212981°N 16.9360172°E
- Length: 50.39 km (31.31 mi)

Basin features
- Progression: Ilova→ Sava→ Danube→ Black Sea

Toplica is a river in Croatia, a left tributary to Ilova.

== Sources ==
- Čanjevac, Ivan; Pavlek, Katarina; Orešić, Danijel (2022). "River lengths in Croatia determined from a topographic map at a scale of 1:25,000". Croatian Geographical Bulletin. 84 (1).
