= Gregurovec, Sveti Petar Orehovec =

Coordinates: 46°02′N 16°27′E

Gregurovec
- Village
- Interactive map of Gregurovec
- Country: Croatia
- County: Koprivnica-Križevci County

Area
  - Total: 3.6 km^{2} (1.4 sq mi)

Population (2021)
  - Total: 203
  - Density: 56/km^{2} (150/sq mi)
- Time zone: UTC+1 (CET)
  - Summer (DST): UTC+2 (CEST)

Gregurovec is a village in Croatia.
