= Institute for Environmental and Nature Protection =

Nature protection institute in Croatia

The State Institute for Nature Protection (Croatian: Državni zavod za zaštitu prirode, DZZP) was an institution centrally responsible for specialized nature protection activities in Croatia.

It was set up by the Decree of the Government of the Republic of Croatia dated 30 October 2002 and started operating in September 2003.

The State Institute for Nature Protection performed a number of activities with the aim to ensure the maintenance and enhancement of nature conservation in Croatia in the long run by high quality expertise work.

It received funding from the Croatian state budget via the Environment Protection Administration of the Ministry of Culture.

Today it is defunct and is divided into two following units of the Ministry of Environmental Protection and Green Transition:

The Institute for Environmental and Nature Protection (Croatian: Zavod za zaštitu okoliša i prirode, ZZOP) is a central professional unit within the Ministry, established in 2019 by the integration of the former Croatian Agency for Environment and Nature (HAOP) into the state administration. Its scope of work is focused on highly professional and scientific tasks: collecting, integrating and analyzing data on all components of the environment (air, soil, water, climate) and nature (biological and landscape diversity). The Institute is key to the creation of Red Lists and Red Books, the establishment and management of the Nature Protection Information System (Bioportal), and the development of expert bases for the declaration of protected areas and management plans for the Natura 2000 network. It also conducts national monitoring of the state of species and habitats, coordinates reporting to the European Environment Agency (EEA), and provides expert support in the procedures for assessing the acceptability of interventions for the ecological network.

The Nature Protection Administration (Croatian: Uprava za zaštitu prirode), as a separate administrative unit within the same Ministry, performs the function of a regulatory and executive body. While the Institute deals with the expert background, the Administration carries out administrative procedures, adopts decisions, regulations and legal acts that operationalize nature protection in Croatia. Its primary focus is on strategic planning, coordination of the work of public institutions that manage national parks and nature parks, and issuing permits for research and activities in protected areas. The Administration monitors the implementation of international conventions (such as CITES), maintains a register of protected areas and ensures the compliance of national legislation with the EU acquis. Although inspection supervision was transferred to the competence of the State Inspectorate in 2019, the Administration remains key to financing policy, cross-border cooperation and resolving legal issues related to the protection status of natural resources.

== Institute's responsibilities ==
- Data collection and processing,
- Preparation of expert documents for nature protection,
- Organization and implementation of the national monitoring system for species and habitat types of national and EU importance,
- Assessment and continuous development of national Red Lists and Red Books,
- Specialized activities with respect to preparation of nature-friendliness studies for individual developments,
- Organization and implementation of educational and promotional nature protection activities,
- Participation in execution of international nature protection agreements to which the Republic of Croatia is a party,
- Participation in implementation of the European Union guidelines,
- Implementation of nature protection projects and programmes,
- Co-operation in implementation of nature protection projects.
