= Lonjsko Polje =

Wetland in Croatia

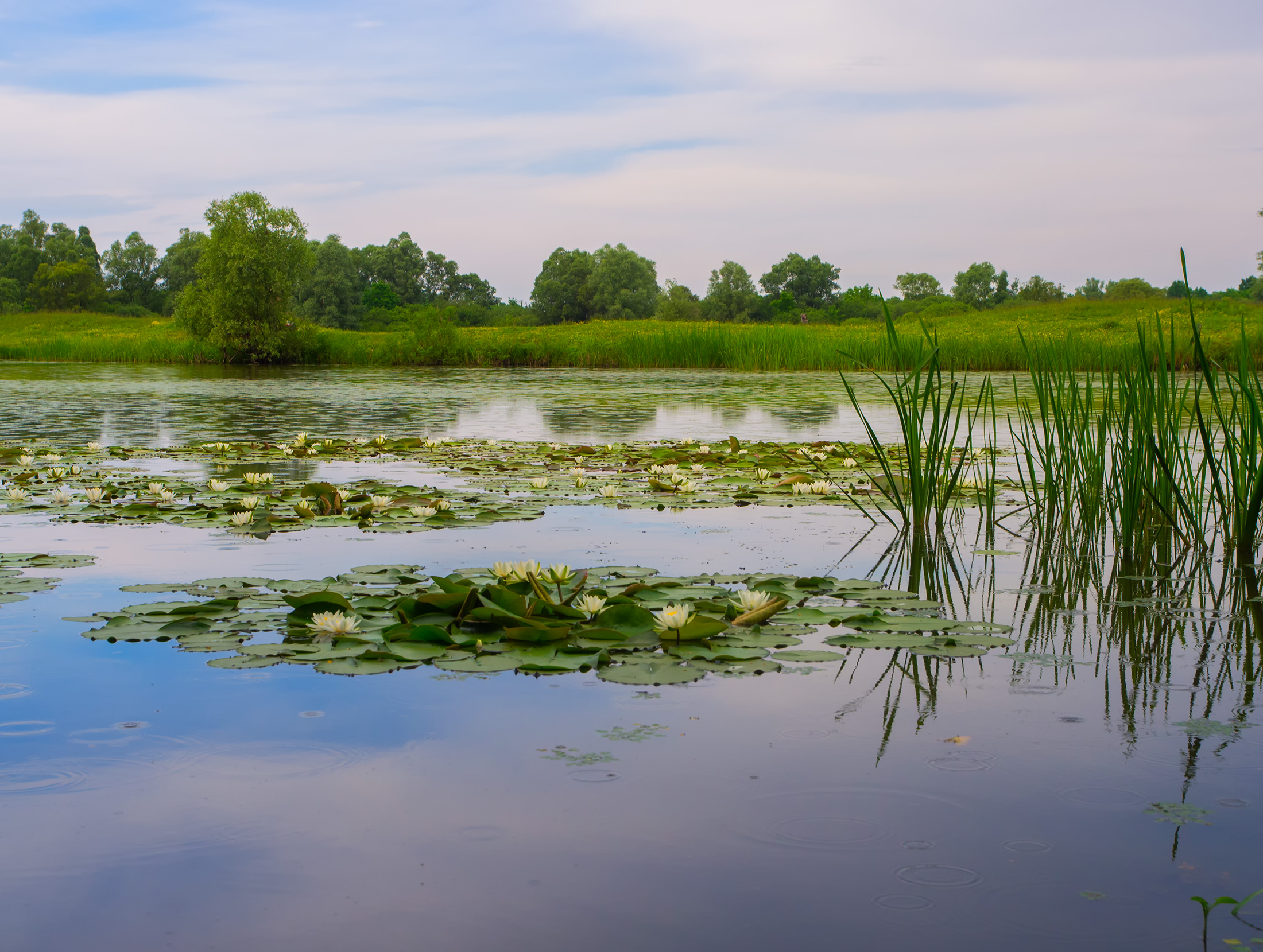
- Lonjsko Polje during spring
- Interactive map of Lonjsko Polje
- Type: Public
- Coordinates: 45°25′N 16°38′E
- Area: 505.6 square kilometres (195.2 sq mi)
- Status: Open year round

Ramsar Wetland
- Official name: Lonjsko Polje Nature Park
- Designated: 18 January 1993
- Reference no.: 584

Lonjsko Polje (English: Lonja Field) is the largest protected wetland in both Croatia and the entire Danube basin. It covers an area of 505.6 square kilometres (195.2 sq mi), extending along the river Sava from the areas east of Sisak, the lower course of the river Lonja for which it is named, to the areas west of Nova Gradiška, along the course of the river Veliki Strug.

The area of Lonjsko Polje is designated a nature park (park prirode), a kind of protected area in Croatia. The institution was established in 1998, and it is based in the village Krapje in the municipality of Jasenovac.

According to the criteria of the Birds Directive of the European Union, the park is an important habitat for birds (Important Bird Area - IBA).

== Gallery ==
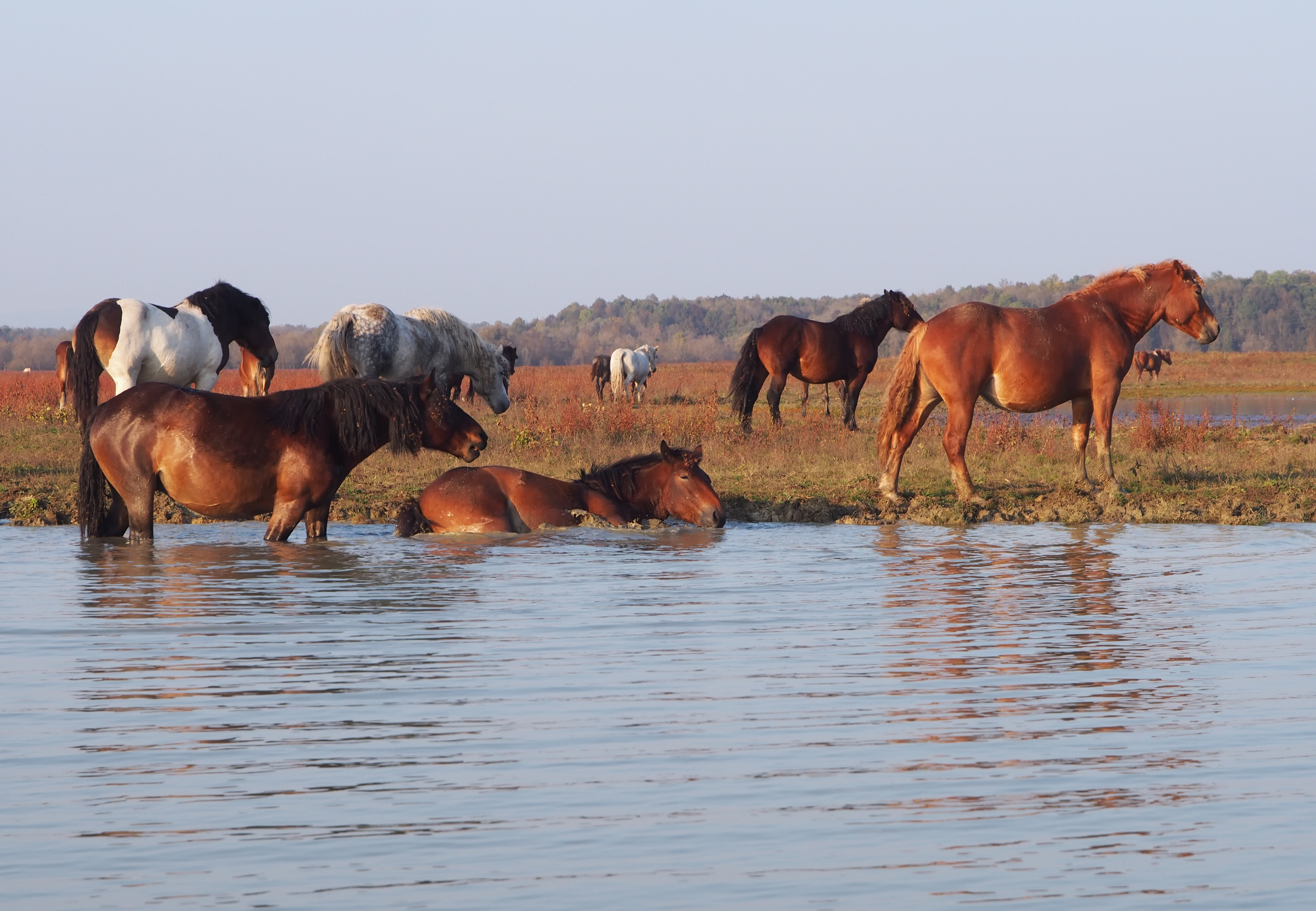
Wild horses

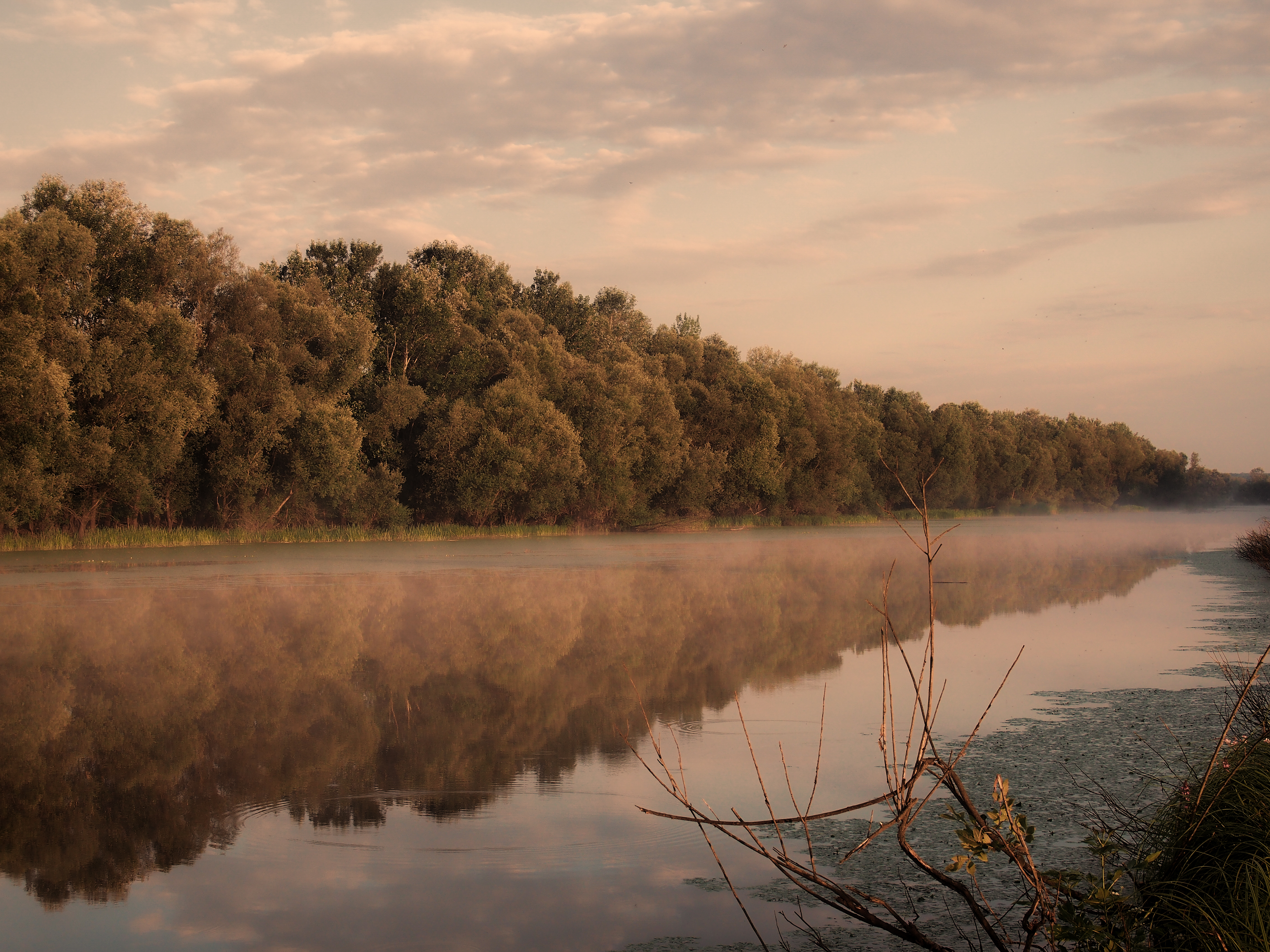
Sava river

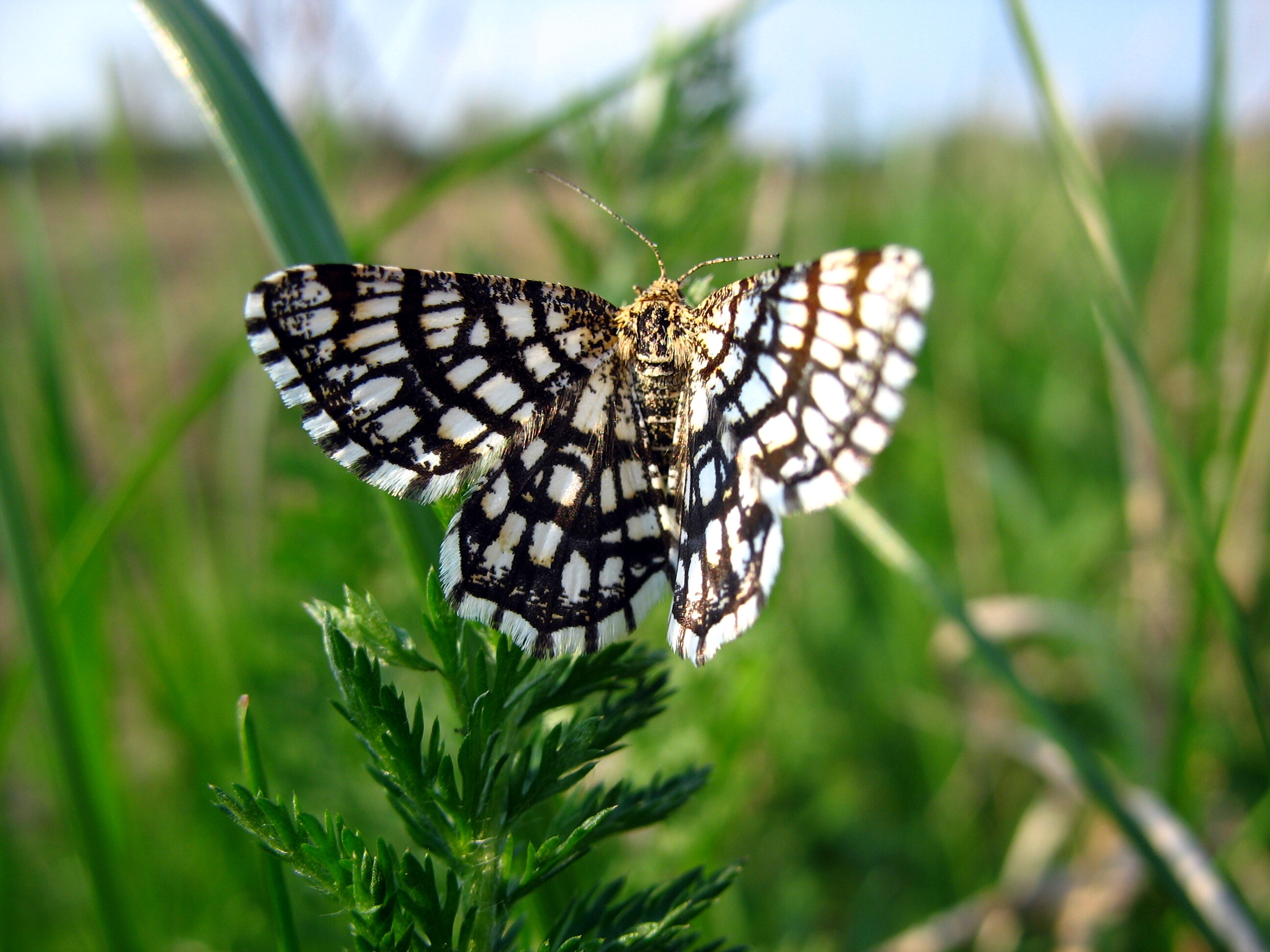
Butterfly

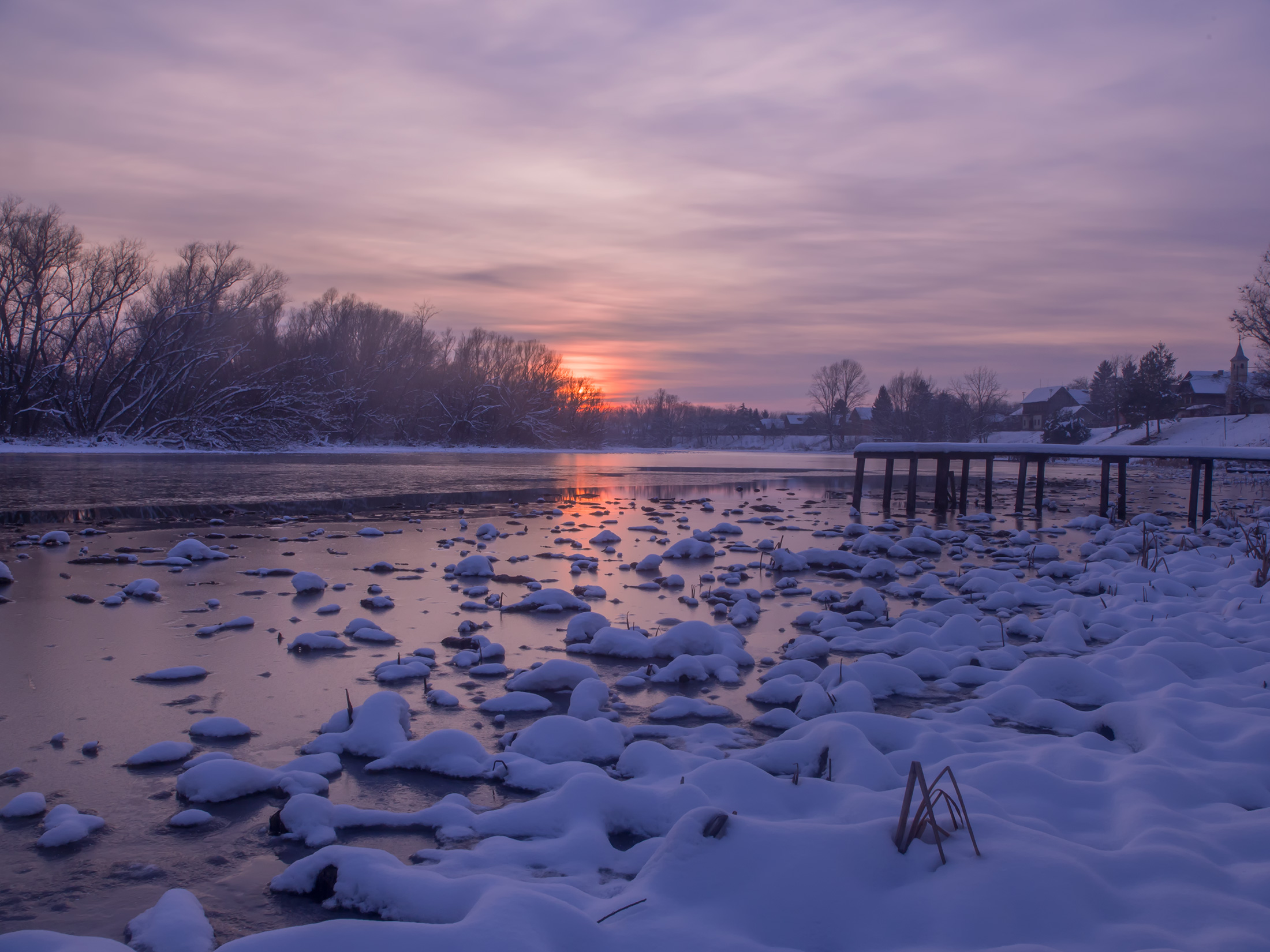
Lonjsko polje during winter

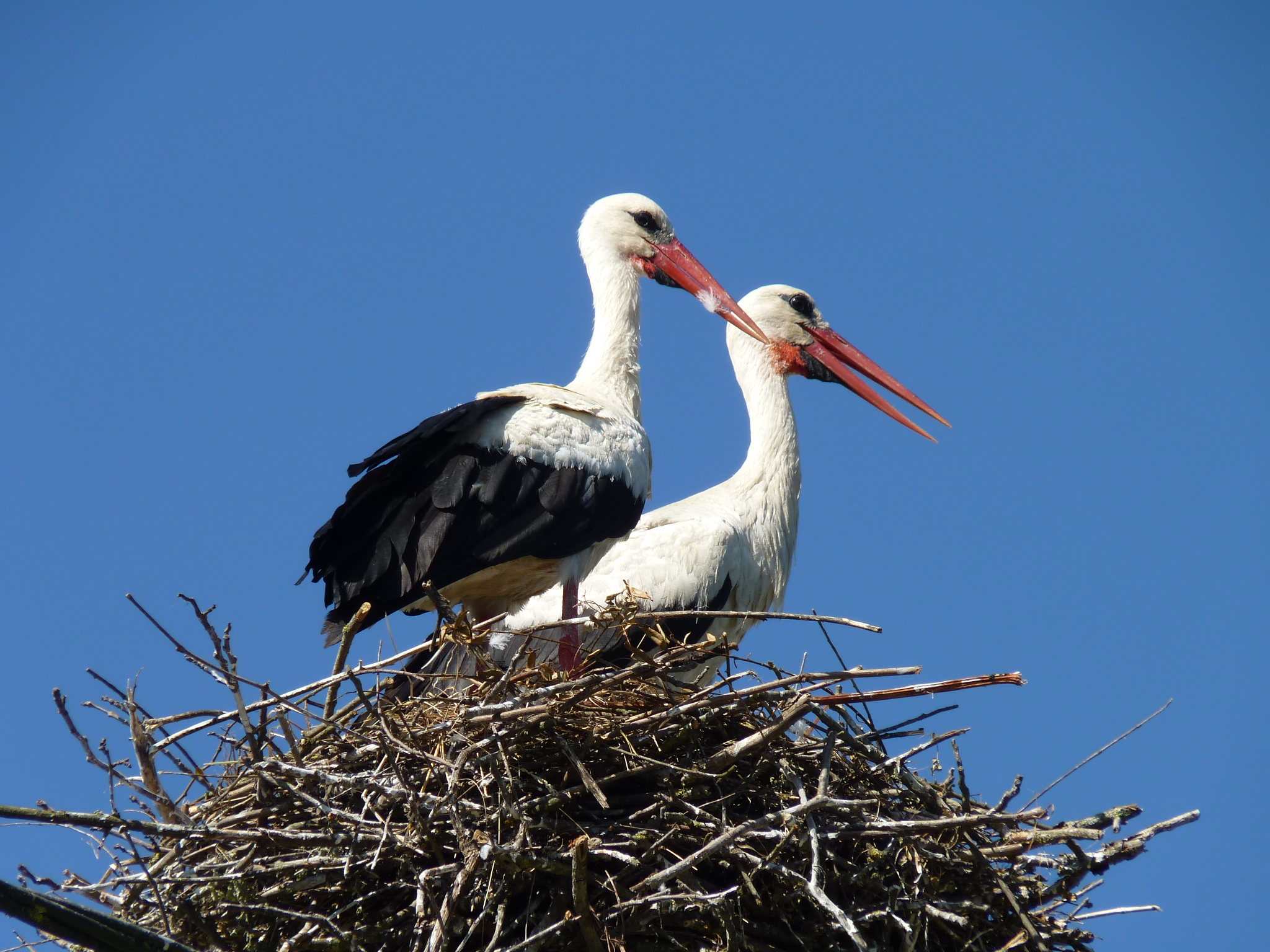
Stork

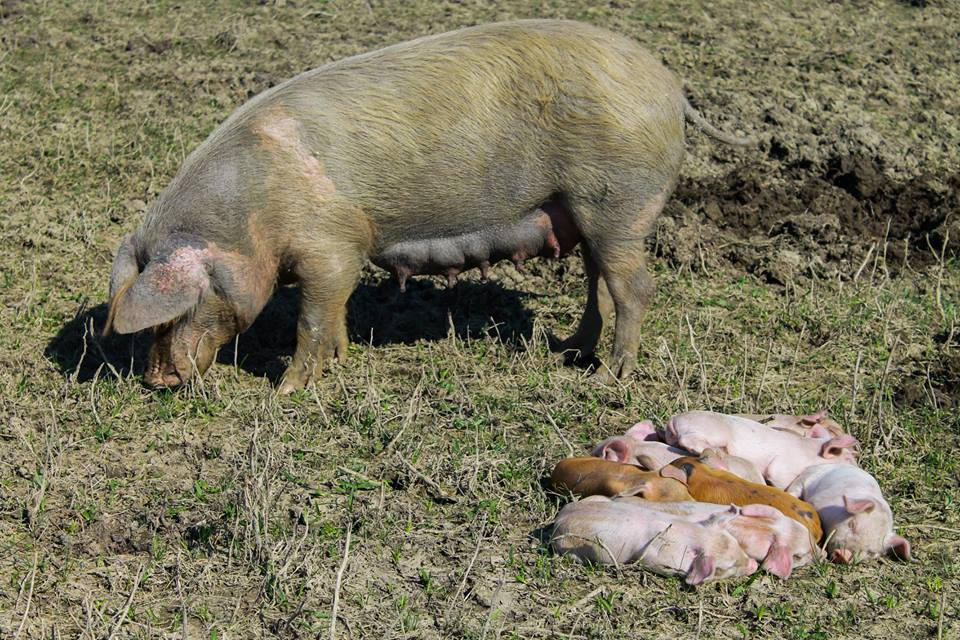
Pig

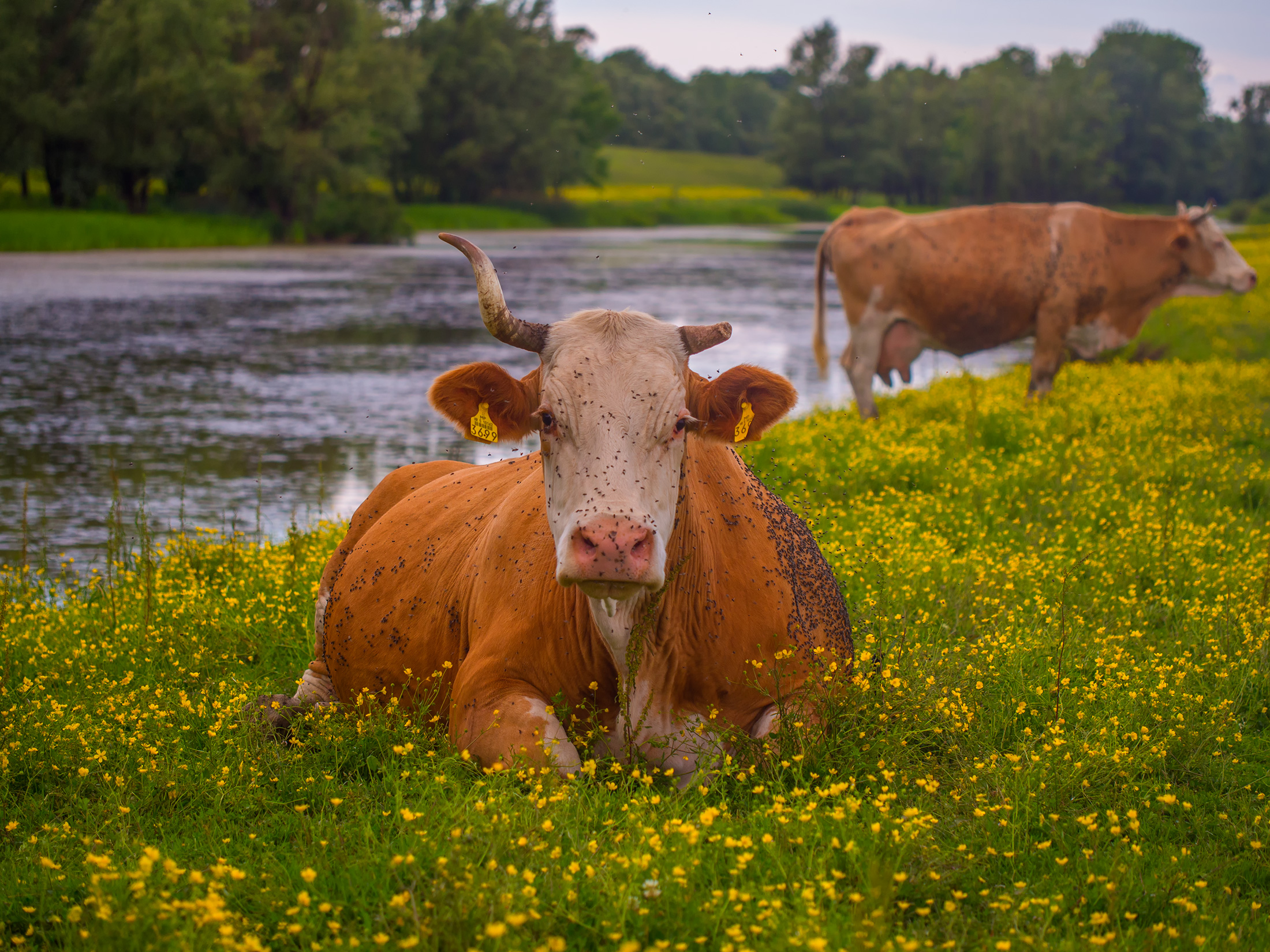
Cow

== See also ==
- Protected areas of Croatia
- Tentative list of World Heritage Sites in Croatia
