= Lonja =

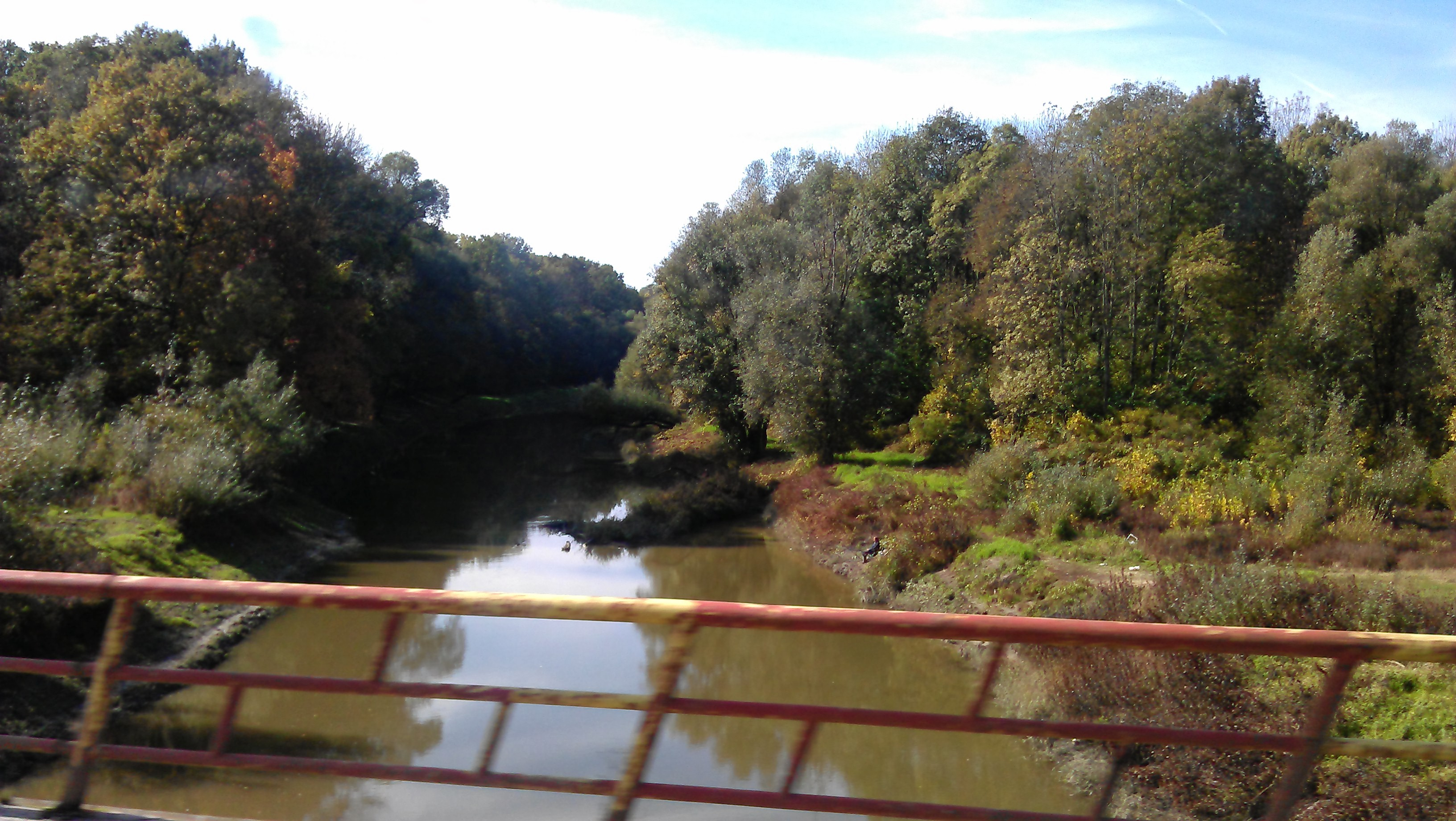

Location
- Country: Croatia

Physical characteristics
- Mouth
  - location: Sava
  - coordinates: 45.3638°N 16.7537°E
- Length: 49.1 km (30.5 mi)
- Basin size: 4,259 km^{2} (1,644 sq mi)

Basin features
- Progression: Sava→ Danube→ Black Sea

The Lonja is a river in central Croatia, a left tributary of the Sava. It is 49 kilometres (30 mi) long and its basin covers an area of 4,259 square kilometres (1,644 sq mi).

The Lonja rises in the Kalnik mountain in northern Croatia, southeast of Novi Marof, at 46.132404°N 16.371417°E. It flows westward until turning south near Breznički Hum, passing east of Sveti Ivan Zelina, and turning southeast near Sveta Helena. East of Lupoglav, it turns south again, passing through Ivanić-Grad and nearing the river Sava.

The flow of the Lonja has been altered with man-made canals: the diversion canal Črnec – Lonja (Žutica), the flood relief canal Lonja – Strug, and the connecting canal Zelina – Lonja – Glogovnica – Česma.

It then flows parallel to the Sava for the rest of its course, and the nature park Lonjsko polje, a protected area, covers the remainder of the Lonja river basin. Near the end of its course, the river splits into Stara Lonja ("Old Lonja") that enters Sava at the eponymous village of Lonja; and Trebeš or Trebež that discharges into the Sava some 5.5 km downstream in the eponymous village of Trebež at 45.3638°N 16.7537°E.

The main tributaries of the Lonja are:

- Česma (Čazma) (106 km long), which joins Lonja northeast of Sisak
- Zelina, south of Ivanić-Grad
