= Kalnik (mountain) =

Mountain in northwestern Croatia

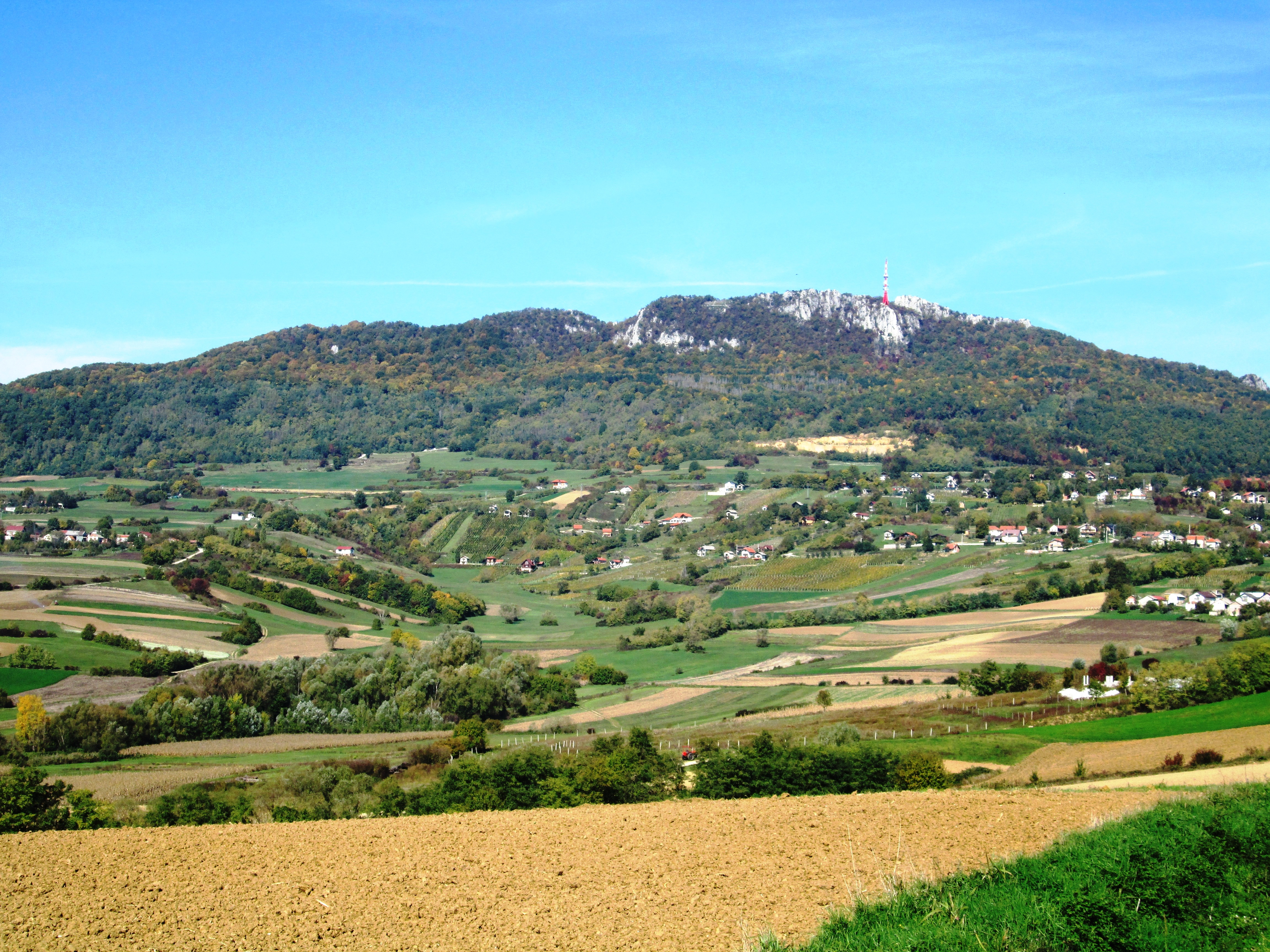
- Panorama of Kalnik

Highest point
- Elevation: 642 m (2,106 ft)
- Coordinates: 46°08′22″N 16°27′31″E

Geography
- Location within Croatia
- Location: Croatia

Kalnik or Kalničko gorje is a mountain in northwestern Croatia. Its highest peak is the eponymous Kalnik at 642 metres (2,106 ft).

== Flora ==
A total of 14 invasive species have been catalogued on Kalnik:

- Acer negundo. First noted on Kalnik at the end of the 20th century. Found at lower elevations on abandoned farmland, forest edges, clearings, and paths.
- Ailanthus altissima. First noted on Kalnik in the 1980s. More frequent and more aggressive in the lowlands at the base of Kalnik.
- Ambrosia artemisiifolia. Noted at Pitomača in 1941, spreading to Kalnik possibly from there. Found at all elevations on abandoned farmland, forest edges, clearings, and paths. Conifer clearings form especially favorable conditions.
- Amorpha fruticosa. First noted on Kalnik in the 2nd half of the 20th century. Found at lower elevations, especially at stream edges, from which it gradually spreads into the forest margins.
- Asclepias syriaca. First noted in the broader region in the 2nd half of the 19th century. Found at lower elevations in anthropogenic habitats. Conifer clearings form especially favorable conditions.
- Echinocystis lobata. First noted in NW Kalnik along streams, to which it had spread from the lowlands.
- Erigeron annuus. First noted in the broader region in 1857. Found mainly in anthropogenic habitats, on abandoned farmland, forest edges, clearings, and paths. Conifer clearings form especially favorable conditions.
- Erigeron canadensis. First noted in Dalmatia in 1847. Found throughout Kalnik, mainly in sunny habitats.
- Impatiens glandulifera. First noted in Croatia in the 1970s. Found in lowlands and along streams. Conifer clearings form especially favorable conditions.
- Juncus tenuis. First noted in Croatia in the mid-1960s. Found sporadically along and on paths, but also in the wetter parts of clearings, both anthropogenic and natural.
- Phytolacca americana. First noted on Kalnik at the end of the 20th century in conifer clearings on the SW slopes. Conifer clearings form especially favorable conditions.
- Reynoutria japonica. First noted in Croatia in the 2nd half of the 20th century. Found sporadically along streams, roads, and forest margins. Several larger populations are found in NW Kalnik.
- Robinia pseudoacacia. First noted in Croata at the beginning of the 20th century. Found throughout Kalnik. As a pioneer species, it often forms monospecific stands.
- Solidago gigantea. First noted in Podravina in 1943. Found in sunny positions among younger vegetation. It does not tolerate shade, so stands die out with succession.

Of these invasives, R. pseudoacacia creates the biggest problem, outcompeting other species during the renewal phase.

== Mountain huts ==
In the 1935–1936 season, the mountain hut on Kalnik, at 560 metres (1,840 ft) in elevation, saw 722 visitors, including 6 Austrian, 4 Czechoslovak and 2 German citizens. In the 1936–1937 season, it saw 1291 visitors, including 6 Czechoslovak, 2 Austrian and 1 English citizens.

== See also ==
- List of caves on Kalnik

== Bibliography ==
=== Alpinism ===
- Poljak, Željko (February 1959). "Kalnik". Kazalo za "Hrvatski planinar" i "Naše planine" 1898—1958 (PDF). Naše planine. Vol. XI. pp. 2–3. ISSN 0354-0650.

=== Botany ===
- Horvat, Gabrijel; Franjić, Jozo; Škvorc, Željko (2018-06-01). "Sukcesija vegetacije nakon sječe kultura četinjača na Kalniku (Hrvatska)" [Vegetation Succession After the Cutting of Conifer Cultures on the Kalnik Mountain (Croatia)]. Radovi (in Serbo-Croatian). 46 (1): 5–38. eISSN 1849-0875.

=== Geology ===
- Lozić, Sanja; Fuerst-Bjeliš, Borna; Perica, Dražen (2006-06-01). "Quantitative-geomorphological and Environmental-historical Impact of the Ecological Soil Depth; Northwestern Croatia". Hrvatski geografski glasnik. 68 (1): 7–25. doi:10.21861/HGG.2006.68.01.01. eISSN 1848-6401.

=== History ===
- Šimek, Marina; Matijaško, Martina; Šincek, Dubravko (2022). "Srednjovjekovne visinske utvrde na Ivanščici i Kalniku: Mlaka, Ivanovec, Starec" [Medieval hill forts on Ivanščica and Kalnik: Mlaka, Ivanovec, Starec]. Cris: Časopis Povijesnog društva Križevci (in Serbo-Croatian). 24 (1) (published 2023-01-28): 195–211. eISSN 1848-9621.

=== Meteorology ===
- Horvat, Gabrijel; Franjić, Jozo (2016-02-29). "Invazivne biljke kalničkih šuma" [Invasive plants of Kalnik forests]. Šumarski list (in Serbo-Croatian). 140 (1–2): 53–64. doi:10.31298/sl.140.1-2.6. eISSN 1846-9140.
- Počakal, Damir (2005-12-15). "Influence of Orography on Hail Characteristics in the Continental Part of Croatia". Hrvatski meteorološki časopis (40): 641–642. ISSN 1330-0083.
