= Chetniks =

WWII guerrilla movement in Yugoslavia

- Четници
- Chetnik flag; inscription reads: "For king and fatherland; freedom or death"
- Founder: Draža Mihailović
- Leaders: Draža Mihailović (executed); Ilija Trifunović-Birčanin #; Dobroslav Jevđević; Pavle Đurišić (executed); Momčilo Đujić (WIA); Zaharije Ostojić (executed); Petar Baćović (executed); Vojislav Lukačević (executed); Dragutin Keserović (executed); Jezdimir Dangić (executed); Nikola Kalabić (executed) or †; Zvonimir Vučković; Miroslav Trifunović †; Predrag Raković †; Dragoslav Račić †; Velimir Piletić; Karl Novak
- Founded: May 11 1941
- Dates active: 1941–1945
- Dissolved: March 1946
- Country: Kingdom of Serbia (1902–1918); Government of National Salvation (1941–1945); Fascist Italy (1941–1945); Independent State of Croatia (1941–1945); Federal People's Republic of Yugoslavia (1945–1946)
- Allegiance: Yugoslav government-in-exile (until August 1944): King Peter II
- Headquarters: Ravna Gora near Suvobor
- Active regions: Occupied Yugoslavia
- Ideology: See Ideology section
- Status: Dissolved
- Wars: World War II; World War II in Yugoslavia; Spring 1945 offensive in Italy; Race for Trieste; Chetnik insurgency in Yugoslavia (1944–1950)

The Chetniks, (Note: Serbo-Croatian: Четници, Četnici, pronounced [tʃɛ̂tniːtsi]; Slovene: Četniki) formally the Chetnik Detachments of the Yugoslav Army, and also the Yugoslav Army in the Homeland (Note: Serbo-Croatian: Југословенска војска у отаџбини, Jugoslovenska vojska u otadžbini; Slovene: Jugoslovanska vojska v domovini) and informally colloquially the Ravna Gora Movement, was a Yugoslav royalist and Serbian nationalist movement and guerrilla force in Axis-occupied Yugoslavia.

Although it was not a homogeneous movement, it was led by Draža Mihailović. While it was anti-Axis in its long-term goals and engaged in marginal resistance activities for limited periods, it also engaged in tactical or selective collaboration with Axis forces for almost all of the war. The Chetnik movement adopted a policy of collaboration with regard to the Axis, and engaged in cooperation to one degree or another by both establishing a modus vivendi and operating as "legalised" auxiliary forces under Axis control. Over a period of time, and in different parts of the country, the movement was progressively drawn into collaboration agreements: first with the puppet Government of National Salvation in the German-occupied territory of Serbia, then with the Italians in occupied Dalmatia and Montenegro, with some of the Ustaše forces in northern Bosnia, and, after the Italian capitulation in September 1943, with the Germans directly.

The Chetniks were active in the uprising in the German-occupied territory of Serbia from July to December 1941. Following the initial success of the uprising, the German occupiers enacted Adolf Hitler's formula for suppressing anti-Nazi resistance in Eastern Europe, a ratio of 100 hostages executed for every German soldier killed and 50 hostages executed for every soldier wounded. In October 1941, German soldiers and Serbian collaborators perpetrated two massacres against civilians in Kraljevo and Kragujevac, with a combined death toll reaching over 4,500 civilians, most of whom were Serbs. This convinced Mihailović that killing German troops would only result in further unnecessary deaths of tens of thousands of Serbs. As a result, he decided to scale back Chetnik guerrilla attacks and wait for an Allied landing in the Balkans. While Chetnik collaboration reached "extensive and systematic" proportions, the Chetniks themselves referred to their policy of collaboration as "using the enemy". The political scientist Sabrina Ramet has observed, "[b]oth the Chetniks' political program and the extent of their collaboration have been amply, even voluminously, documented; it is more than a bit disappointing, thus, that people can still be found who believe that the Chetniks were doing anything besides attempting to realize a vision of an ethnically homogeneous Greater Serbian state, which they intended to advance, in the short run, by a policy of collaboration with the Axis forces".

The Chetniks were partners in the pattern of terror and counter-terror that developed in Yugoslavia during World War II. They used terror tactics against Croats in areas where Serbs and Croats were intermixed, against the Muslim population in Bosnia, Herzegovina and Sandžak, and against the Communist-led Yugoslav Partisans and their supporters in all areas. These tactics included the killing of civilians, burning of villages, assassinations and destruction of property, and exacerbating existing ethnic tensions between Croats and Serbs. The terror tactics against the non-Serb population in the NDH were, at least to an extent, a reaction to the massacres of Serbs carried out by the Ustaše, however the largest Chetnik massacres took place in eastern Bosnia where they preceded any significant Ustaše operations. Non-Serbs including Croats and Bosniaks living in areas intended to be part of Greater Serbia were to be cleansed of regardless, in accordance with Mihailović's directive of 20 December 1941. The terror against the communist Partisans and their supporters was ideologically driven. Several historians regard Chetnik actions during this period as constituting genocide. Estimates of the number of deaths caused by the Chetniks in Croatia and Bosnia and Herzegovina range from 50,000 to 68,000, while more than 5,000 victims are registered in the region of Sandžak alone. About 300 villages and small towns were destroyed, along with a large number of mosques and Catholic churches.

== Etymology ==
The etymology of the word Chetnik is obscure. Some believe it to have developed from the Turkish word çete, meaning "armed band", while another view is it was inherited from the Proto-Slavic četa + nik, meaning "member of a company". The word may also derive from the Latin word coetus ("coming together" or "assembly"). The suffix -nik is a Slavic common personal suffix, meaning "person or thing associated with or involved in".

The first use of Chetnik to describe members of army and police units appeared around the mid-18th century. Matija Ban used the word Chetnik in 1848 in terms of the need to establish armed units outside the Principality of Serbia to act in opposition to Ottoman rule following the rise of nationalism in the Balkans. At end of the 19th century, the term was extended to members of military or paramilitary organizations with Serb ethnonationalist aims. Dating from 1904, the Serbian word četnik was commonly used to describe a member of a Balkan guerrilla force called a cheta (četa/чета), meaning "band" or "troop". Today, the word Chetnik is used to refer to members of any group that follows "the hegemonic and expansionist politics driven by Greater Serbia ideology".

== Background ==
=== Before 1918 ===
Small-scale rebellious activity akin to guerrilla warfare has a long history in the South Slav-inhabited lands, particularly in those areas that were under Ottoman rule for a long period. In the First Serbian Uprising which began in 1804, bandit companies (hajdučke čete) played an important part until large-scale fighting gave the Ottomans the upper hand and the uprising was suppressed by 1813. A second rebellion broke out two years later, and guerrilla warfare was again utilised to significant effect, assisting in the establishment of the partially-independent Principality of Serbia, which was expanded significantly in 1833 and became fully independent in 1878. Throughout this period and until the end of the 19th century interest in guerrilla warfare remained, with books on the subject being commissioned by the Serbian government and published in 1848 and 1868. Four years after independence, the principality became the Kingdom of Serbia.

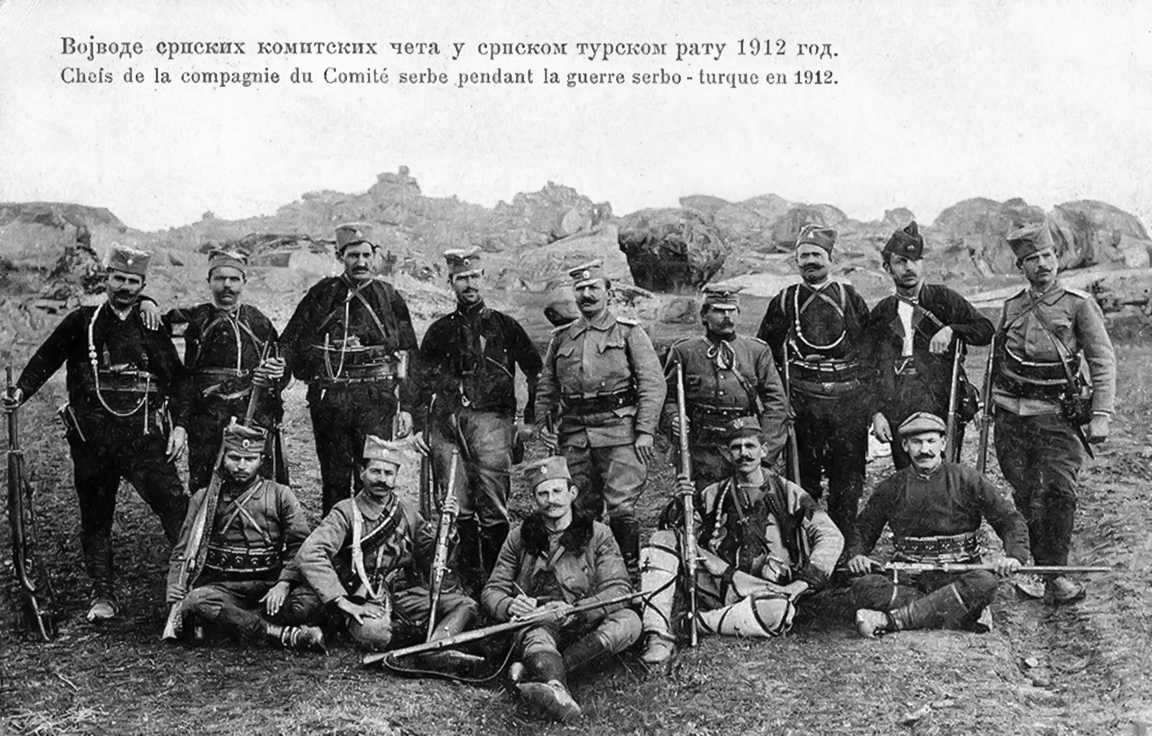
Vojin Popović with a group of Chetnik commanders in 1912

Between 1904 and 1912, small groups of fighters who had been privately recruited, equipped and funded in Serbia, travelled to the region of Macedonia within the Ottoman Empire with the aim of releasing the area from Ottoman rule and annexing it to Serbia, regardless of the wishes of the local population. These groups were, in the main, commanded and led by officers and non-commissioned officers on active duty in the Royal Serbian Army, and the Serbian government soon took over the direction of these activities. Similar forces had been sent to Macedonia by Greece and Bulgaria, who also wished to integrate the region into their own states, resulting in the Serbian Chetniks clashing with their rivals from Bulgaria as well as the Ottoman authorities. Except for the social democratic press, these Chetnik actions were supported in Serbia and interpreted as being in the national interest. These Chetnik activities largely ceased following the 1908 Young Turk Revolution in the Ottoman Empire. The Chetniks were active in the Balkan Wars of 1912–1913; during the First Balkan War against the Ottomans they were used as vanguards to soften up the enemy ahead of advancing armies, for attacks on communications behind enemy lines, for spreading panic and confusion, as field gendarmerie and to establish basic administration in occupied areas. They were also put to good use against the Bulgarians in the Second Balkan War. After the Balkan Wars, Chetniks bands were used in the pacification of the new areas of Serbia gained during the wars, which occasionally involved terrorising civilians.

As they had proven valuable during the Balkan Wars, the Serbian army used Chetniks in World War I in the same way, and while useful they suffered heavy losses. At the end of the Serbian campaign of 1914–1915, they withdrew with the army in the Great Retreat to Corfu and later fought on the Macedonian front. Montenegrin Chetniks also fought against the Austro-Hungarian occupation of that country. In late 1916, new Chetnik companies were being organised to fight in Bulgarian-occupied southeastern Serbia. Concerned about reprisals against a large-scale uprising, the Serbian army sent the veteran Chetnik leader Kosta Pećanac to prevent the outbreak. However, the Bulgarians started conscripting Serbs, and hundreds of men joined the Chetnik detachments. This resulted in the 1917 Toplica Uprising under the leadership of Kosta Vojinović, which Pećanac eventually joined. Successful at first, the uprising was eventually put down by the Bulgarians and Austro-Hungarians, and bloody reprisals against the civilian population followed. Pećanac then used Chetniks for sabotage and raids against the Bulgarian occupation troops, then infiltrated the Austro-Hungarian occupied zone. Just prior to the end of the war, the Chetnik detachments were dissolved, with some sent home and others absorbed by the rest of the army. The Kingdom of Serbs, Croats and Slovenes was created with the merger of Serbia, Montenegro and the South Slav-inhabited areas of Austria-Hungary on 1 December 1918, in the immediate aftermath of the war.

=== Interwar period ===
Due to their military record since 1904, Chetnik veterans were among the leading Serbian patriotic groups in the new state. In 1921, the "Chetnik Association for the Freedom and Honor of the Fatherland" was organised in Belgrade by Chetnik veterans, with organisational aims of cultivating Chetnik history, spreading Chetnik patriotic ideas, and to care for the widows and orphans of Chetniks who had been killed, along with disabled Chetniks. It was also a political pressure group, and from the beginning there were questions about its leadership and political ideology. Initially, the main political influence in the organisation was the liberal Democratic Party, but a challenge for influence by the dominant People's Radical Party led to a split in 1924. The pro-Radical Greater Serbia elements of the association broke away and formed two new organisations in 1924, the "Association of Serbian Chetniks for King and Fatherland" and the "Association of Serbian Chetniks 'Petar Mrkonjić'". In July 1925 these two organisations amalgamated as the "Association of Serbian Chetniks 'Petar Mrkonjić' for King and Fatherland" led by Puniša Račić, who was elected to the National Assembly as a Radical representative in 1927, and in 1928 murdered three Croatian Peasant Party representatives in an assassination on the floor of the National Assembly. He presided over a great deal of dissension until the organisation ceased to operate. After the imposition of the royal dictatorship by King Alexander in 1929, at which time the state was renamed the Kingdom of Yugoslavia, Račić's former organisation was dissolved, and the former dissidents rejoined the original "Chetnik Association for the Freedom and Honor of the Fatherland", which was officially sanctioned.

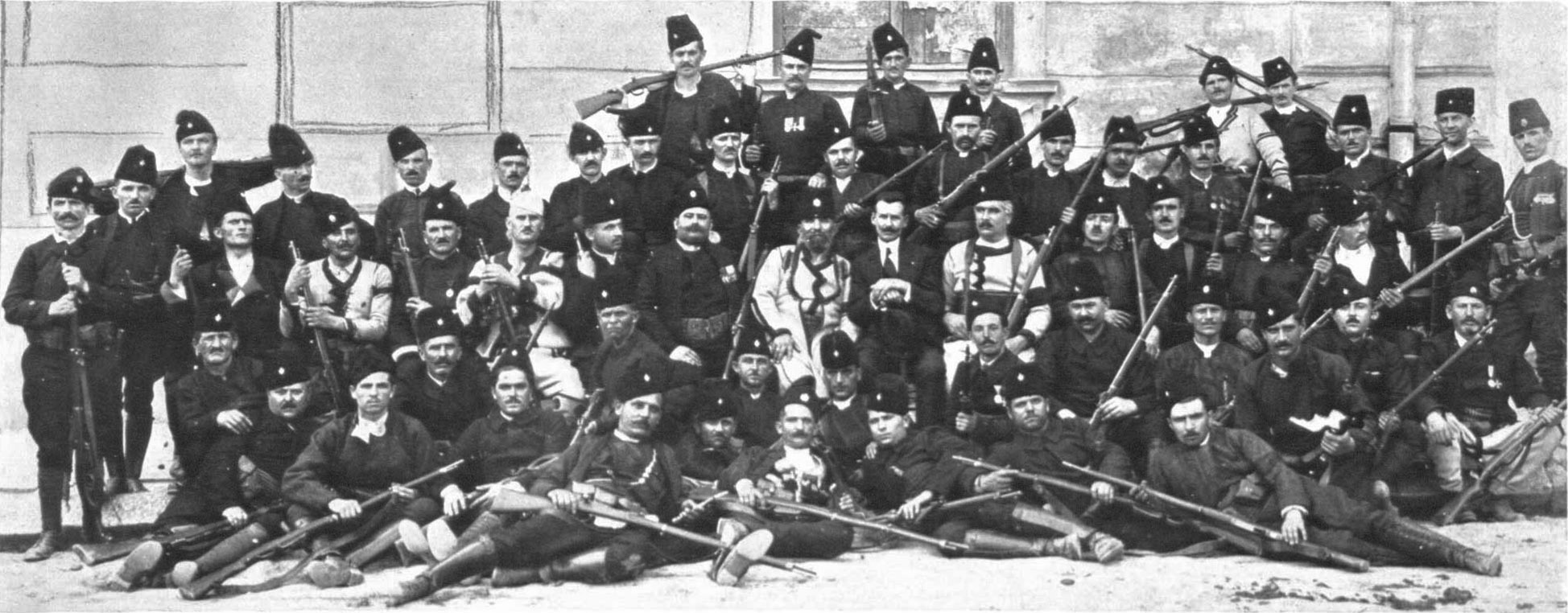
A group of Chetniks in the early 1920s

Immediately following the end of World War I and the formation of the new state, there was widespread unrest. Pro-Bulgarian sentiment was rife in Macedonia, which was referred to as South Serbia by the Belgrade government. There was little support among the Macedonian populace for the regime. Extensive measures were undertaken to "serbianise" Macedonia, including closing Bulgarian Orthodox Church schools, revising history textbooks, dismissing "unreliable" teachers, banning the use of the Bulgarian language, and imposing lengthy jail terms for those convicted of anti-state activities. Over 300 Macedonian advocates of Greater Bulgaria were murdered between 1918 and 1924, thousands were arrested in the same period, and around 50,000 troops were stationed in Macedonia. Thousands of Serb colonists were settled in Macedonia. Bands of Chetniks, including one led by Jovan Babunski, were organised to terrorise the population, kill pro-Bulgarian resistance leaders and impress the local population into forced labour for the army. Resistance by the Internal Macedonian Revolutionary Organization was met with further terror, which included the formation in 1922 of the Association against Bulgarian Bandits led by Pećanac and Ilija Trifunović-Lune, based out of Štip in eastern Macedonia. This organisation quickly garnered a reputation for indiscriminate terrorisation of the Macedonian populace. Pećanac and his Chetniks were also active in fighting Albanians resisting the Serb and Montenegrin colonisation of Kosovo.

Even under the homogenizing pressures of dictatorship, the Chetniks were not a monolithic movement. In 1929, Ilija Trifunović-Birčanin became president of the association, serving until 1932, when he became president of another Serbian nationalist organisation, Narodna Odbrana (National Defence), and established the rival "Association of Old Chetniks", but the latter never challenged the main Chetnik organisation. He was replaced by Pećanac, who continued to lead the organisation until the invasion of Yugoslavia in April 1941. Starting in 1929, the main Chetnik organisations established chapters in at least 24 cities and towns outside Serbia proper, many of which had large Croatian populations. This expansion of what remained a Serb "nationalist-chauvinist" movement outside Serbia proper escalated ethnic tensions, especially the conflict between Serbs and Croats. Under Pećanac's leadership, membership of the Chetnik organisation was opened to new young members who had not served in war and were interested in joining for political and economic reasons, and in the course of the 1930s he took the organisation from a nationalist veterans' association focused on protecting veterans' rights, to an aggressively partisan Serb political organisation which reached 500,000 members throughout Yugoslavia in more than 1,000 groups. Trifunović-Birčanin and others were unhappy with the aggressive expansion of the organisation and its move away from traditional Chetnik ideals. After 1935, Chetnik activity was officially banned in both the predominantly Croat Sava Banovina and almost entirely in the Slovene Drava Banovina, but the Chetnik groups in those regions were able to continue operating at a lower level. During this period, Pećanac formed close ties with the far-right Yugoslav Radical Union government of Milan Stojadinović, which ruled Yugoslavia from 1935 to 1939. During the interwar period, limited training on guerrilla warfare was given to junior officers of the army, and in 1929 the Handbook on Guerrilla Warfare was published by the government to provide guidance. In 1938, the General Staff revised the approach detailed in 1929, recognising that operations similar to those carried out by Chetniks between 1904 and 1918 would not be possible in a modern war, and clearly indicating that it would not entrust any important wartime functions to the Chetnik Association.

== History ==
=== Formation ===
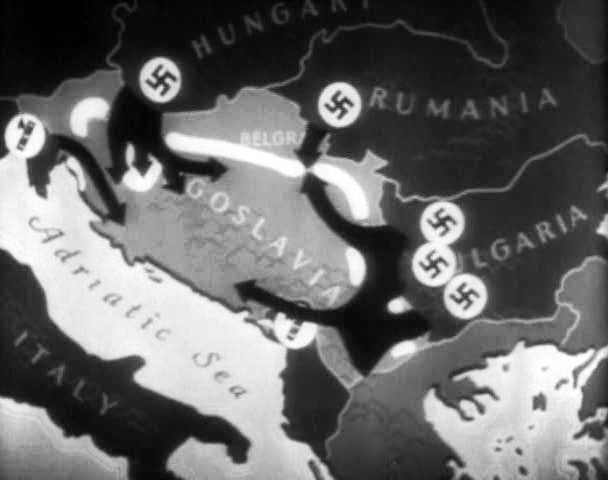
Illustration of the April 1941 Axis invasion of Yugoslavia

After the outbreak of World War II in September 1939 the General Staff was aware that Yugoslavia was not ready for war against the Axis powers and was concerned about neighboring countries igniting a civil war in Yugoslavia. Despite its misgivings about using Chetniks for guerrilla warfare, in April 1940, the General Staff established the Chetnik Command, which eventually comprised six full battalions spread throughout the country. However, it is clear from the series of Yugoslav war plans between 1938 and 1941 that the General Staff had no real commitment to guerrilla warfare prior to the April 1941 Axis invasion of Yugoslavia, and did not seriously consider employing the Chetnik Association in the role either. A short time before the invasion, Pećanac was approached by the General Staff, authorising him to organise guerrilla units in the 5th Army area, and providing him with arms and funds for the purpose; the 5th Army was responsible for the Romanian and Bulgarian borders between the Iron Gates and the Greek border.

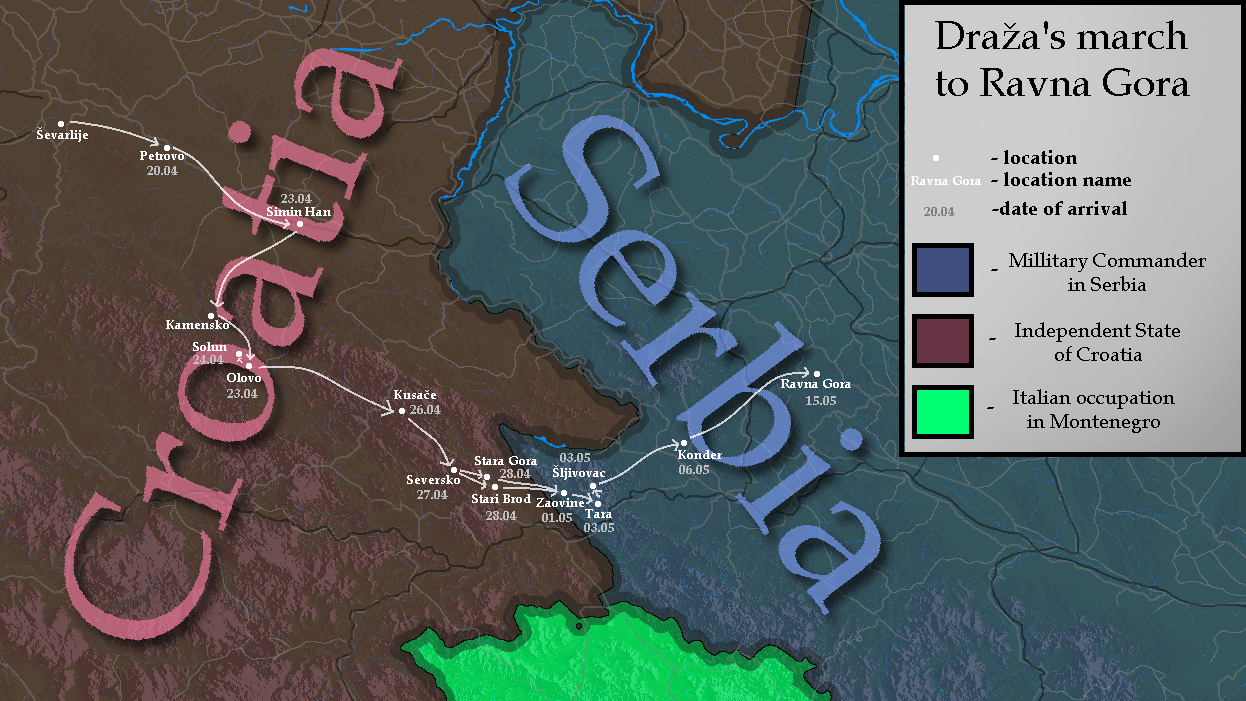
Route of Dragoljub's march from Bosnia to Ravna Gora

On 6 April 1941, Yugoslavia was drawn into World War II when Germany, Italy and Hungary invaded and occupied the country, which was then partitioned. Some Yugoslav territory was annexed by its Axis neighbours: Hungary, Bulgaria and Italy. The Germans engineered and supported the creation of the fascist Ustaše puppet state, the Independent State of Croatia (Croatian: Nezavisna Država Hrvatska, NDH), which roughly comprised most of the pre-war Banovina Croatia, along with rest of present-day Bosnia and Herzegovina and some adjacent territory. Before the defeat, King Peter II and his government went into exile, reforming in June as the Western Allied-recognised Yugoslav government-in-exile in London. All elements of the Chetnik Command were captured during the invasion, and there is no record of them being used for their intended purpose or that elements of these units operated in any organised way after the surrender.

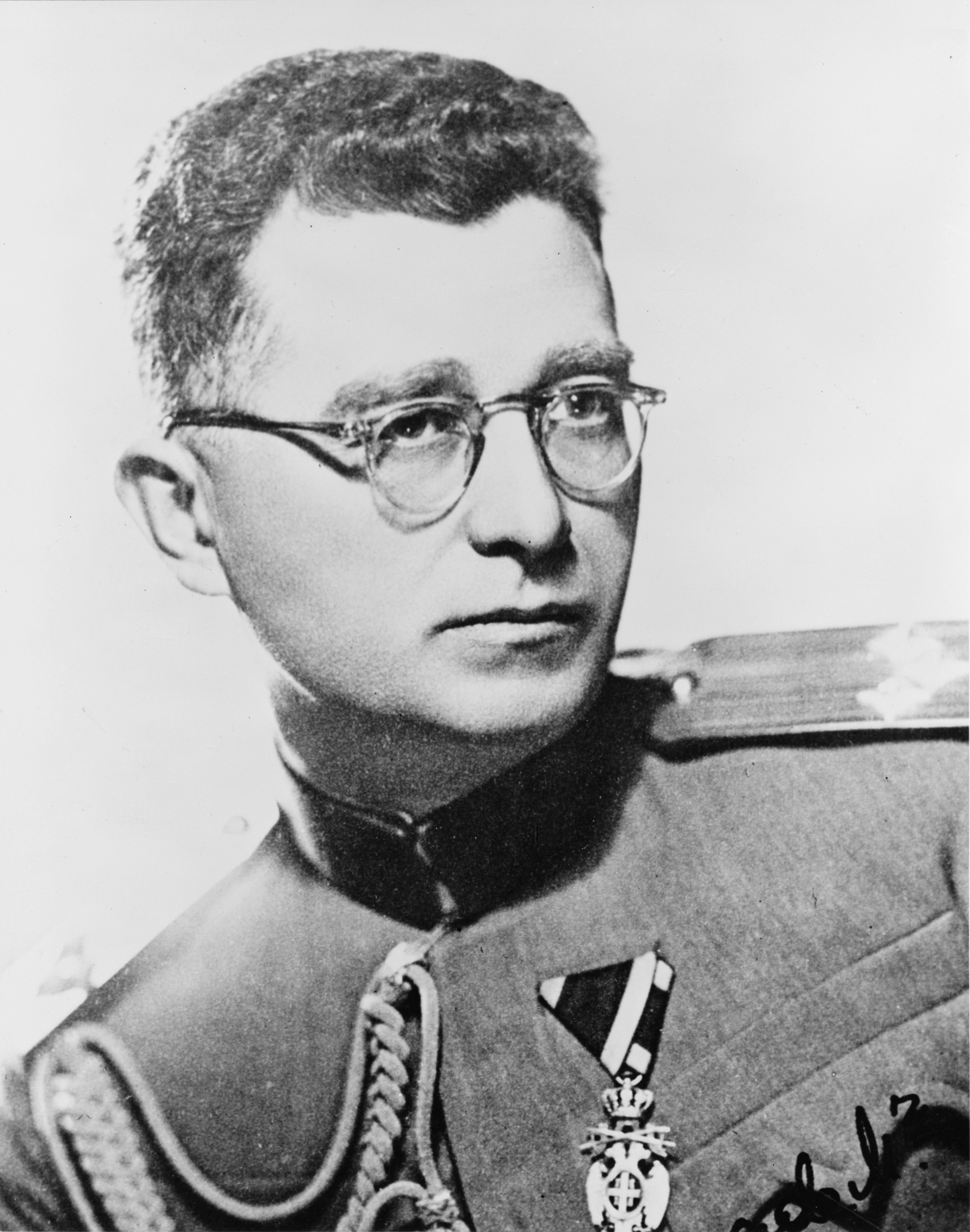
Colonel Draža Mihailović as a Yugoslav military attaché in Prague, Czechoslovakia in 1937

In the early days of the invasion, army Pukovnik (Colonel) Draža Mihailović was the deputy chief of staff of the 2nd Army deployed in Bosnia. On 13 April, he was commanding a unit which was in the area of Doboj on 15 April when it was advised of the decision of the Supreme Staff (the wartime General Staff) to surrender. A few dozen members of the unit, almost exclusively Serbs, joined Mihailović when he decided not to follow these orders, and the group took to the hills. They marched southeast then east, aiming to get to the mountainous interior of what became the German-occupied territory of Serbia in the hope of linking up with other elements of the defeated army that had chosen to keep resisting. In the first few days, Mihailović's group was attacked by German forces. The group was joined by other parties of soldiers but heard no news of others continuing to resist. On 28 April, the group was about 80 strong, and crossed the Drina River into the occupied territory of Serbia the next day, although over the next few days it lost a number of officers and enlisted men who were concerned about the pending hardship and uncertainty. After crossing the Drina, the group was also attacked by gendarmes belonging to the collaborationist puppet Commissioner Government. On 6 May Mihailović's remaining group was surrounded by German troops near Užice and almost completely destroyed. On 13 May, Mihailović arrived at some shepherd huts at Ravna Gora on the western slopes of Suvobor Mountain near the town of Gornji Milanovac in the central part of the occupied territory, by which time his group consisted of only seven officers and 27 other ranks. At this point, now aware that no elements of the army were continuing to fight, they were faced with the decision of whether to surrender to the Germans themselves or form the core of a resistance movement, and Mihailović and his men chose the latter. Due to the location of their headquarters, Mihailović's organisation became known as the "Ravna Gora Movement".

While adherents of the Chetnik movement have claimed that Mihailović's Chetniks were the first resistance movement to be founded in Yugoslavia in World War II, this is not accurate if a resistance movement is defined as a political and military organisation of relatively large numbers of men conducting armed operations intended to be carried on with determination and more or less continuously. Soon after their arrival at Ravna Gora, Mihailović's Chetniks set up a command post and designated themselves the "Chetnik Detachments of the Yugoslav Army". While this name was clearly derivative of the earlier Chetniks and evoked the traditions of the long and distinguished record of the Chetniks of earlier conflicts, Mihailović's organisation was in no way connected to the interwar Chetnik associations or the Chetnik Command established in 1940.

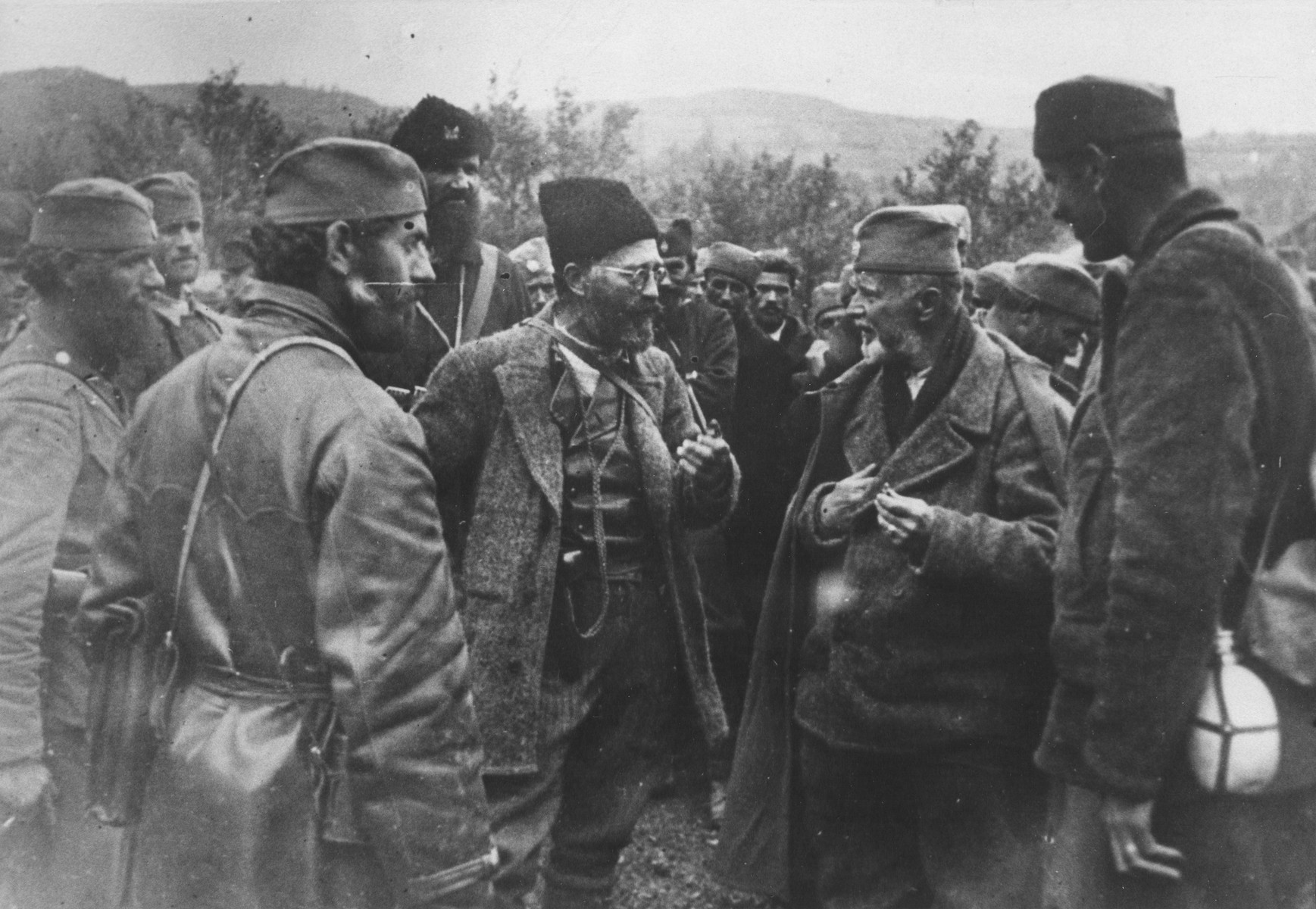
Draža Mihailović (centre with glasses) confers with his principal political adviser Dragiša Vasić (second from right) and others in 1943

As early as August, the Chetnik Central National Committee (Serbo-Croatian: Centralni Nacionalni Komitet, CNK, Централни Национални Комитет) was formed to provide Mihailović with advice on domestic and international political affairs, and to liaise with the civilian populace throughout the occupied territory and in other parts of occupied Yugoslavia where the Chetnik movement had strong support. The members were men who had some standing in Serbian political and cultural circles before the war, and some CNK members also served on the Belgrade Chetnik Committee that supported the movement. Much of the early CNK was drawn from the minuscule Yugoslav Republican Party or the minor Agrarian Party. The three most important members of the CNK, who comprised the executive committee for much of the war, were: Dragiša Vasić, a lawyer, former vice-president of the nationalist Serbian Cultural Club and a former member of the Yugoslav Republican Party; Stevan Moljević, a Bosnian Serb lawyer; and Mladen Žujović, Vasić's law firm partner who had also been a member of the Yugoslav Republican Party. Vasić was the most important of the three, and was designated by Mihailović as the ranking member of a three-man committee, along with Potpukovnik (Lieutenant Colonel) Dragoslav Pavlović and Major Jezdimir Dangić, who were to take over the leadership of the organisation if anything should happen to him. In effect, Vasić was Mihailović's deputy.

=== Ideology ===
From the beginning of Mihailović's movement in May 1941 until the Ba Congress in January 1944, the ideology and objectives of the movement were promulgated in a series of documents. In June 1941, two months before he became a key member of the CNK, Moljević wrote a memorandum entitled Homogeneous Serbia, in which he advocated for the creation of a Greater Serbia within a Greater Yugoslavia which would include not only the vast majority of pre-war Yugoslav territory, but also a significant amount of territory that belonged to all of Yugoslavia's neighbours. Within this, Greater Serbia would consist of 65–70 per cent of the total Yugoslav territory and population, and Croatia would be reduced to a small rump. His plan also included large-scale population transfers, evicting the non-Serb population from within the borders of Greater Serbia, although he did not suggest any numbers.

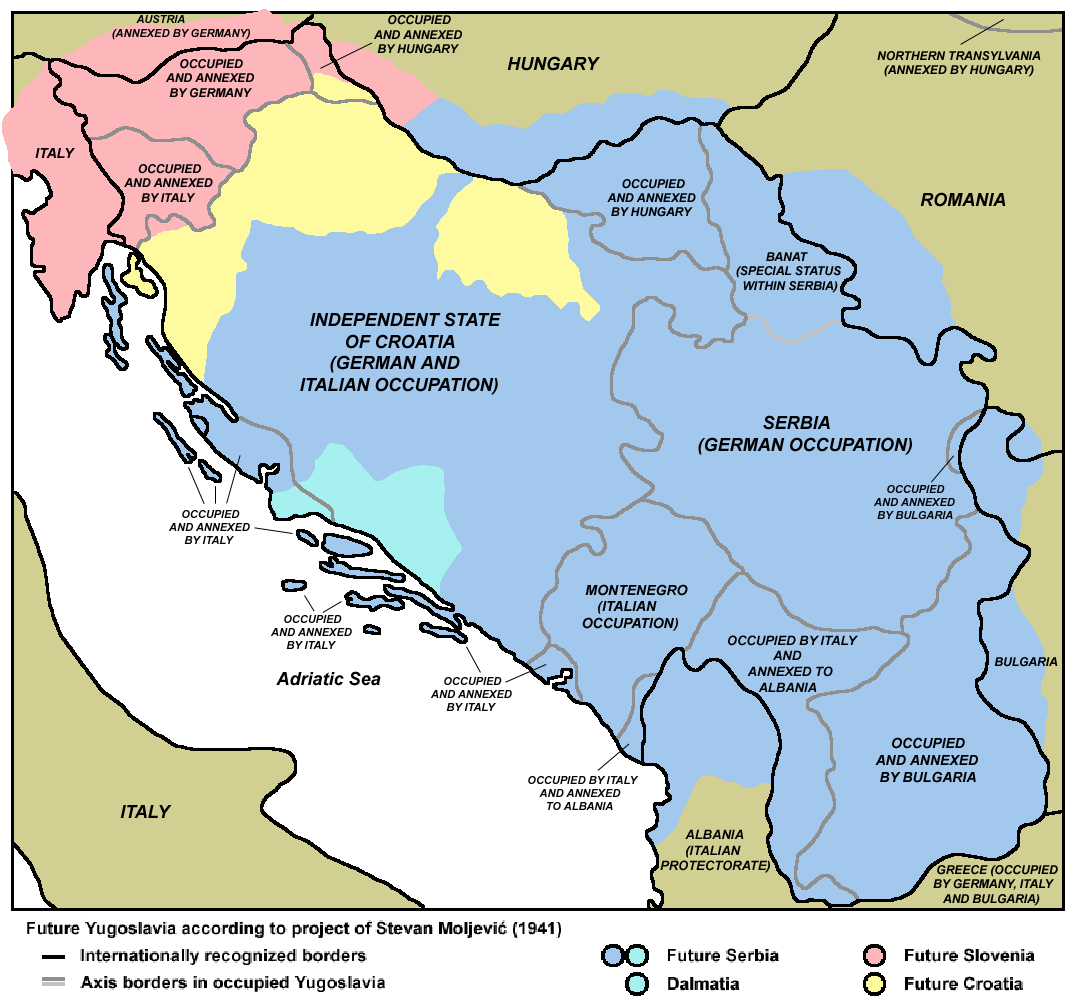
The extent of Greater Serbia envisaged by Moljević

At the same time that Moljević was developing Homogeneous Serbia, the Belgrade Chetnik Committee formulated a proposal which contained territorial provisions very similar to those detailed in Moljević's plan, but went further by providing details of the large-scale population shifts needed to make Greater Serbia ethnically homogenous. It advocated expelling of 2,675,000 people from Greater Serbia, including 1,000,000 Croats and 500,000 Germans. A total of 1,310,000 Serbs would be brought to Greater Serbia from outside its boundaries, of which 300,000 would be Serbs from Croatia. Greater Serbia would not be entirely Serb, however, as about 200,000 Croats would be allowed to stay within its borders. No figures were proposed for shifting Bosnian Muslims out of Greater Serbia, but they were identified as a "problem" to be solved in the final stages of the war and immediately afterwards. The CNK approved the Greater Serbia project after it formed in August. It can be assumed that Mihailović, who was a hard-core Serb nationalist himself, endorsed all or most of both proposals. This is because their contents were reflected in a 1941 Chetnik leaflet entitled Our Way, and he made specific references to them in a proclamation to the Serbian people in December and in a set of detailed instructions dated 20 December 1941 to Pavle Đurišić and Đorđije Lašić, newly appointed Chetnik commanders in the Italian governorate of Montenegro. The Belgrade Chetnik Committee proposal was also smuggled out of occupied Serbia in September and delivered to the Yugoslav government-in-exile in London by the Chetnik agent Miloš Sekulić.

In March 1942, the Chetnik Dinara Division promulgated a statement which was accepted the following month by a meeting of Chetnik commanders from Bosnia, Herzegovina, northern Dalmatia and Lika at Strmica near Knin. This program contained details which were very similar to those included in Mihailović's instructions to Đurišić and Lašić in December 1941. It mentioned the mobilisation of Serbs in these regions to "cleanse" them of other ethnic groups, and adopted several additional strategies: collaboration with the Italian occupiers; determined armed opposition to NDH forces and the Partisans; decent treatment of the Bosnian Muslims to keep them from joining the Partisans, although they could later be eliminated; and the creation of separate Croatian Chetnik units formed from pro-Yugoslav, anti-Partisan Croats.

From 30 November to 2 December 1942, the Conference of Young Chetnik Intellectuals of Montenegro met at Šahovići in Italian-occupied Montenegro. Mihailović did not attend, but his chief of staff Zaharije Ostojić, Đurišić and Lašić attended, with Đurišić playing the dominant role. It advanced strategies that constituted an important and expanded version of the overall Chetnik program, and the report of the meeting bore an official Chetnik stamp. It reinforced the main Greater Serbia objective of the Chetnik movement, and in addition advocated the retention of the Karađorđević dynasty, espoused a unitary Yugoslavia with self-governing Serb, Croat and Slovene units but excluding entities for other Yugoslav peoples such as Macedonians and Montenegrins as well as other minorities. It envisaged a post-war Chetnik dictatorship that would hold all power within the country with the approval of the King, with a gendarmerie recruited from Chetnik ranks, and intense promotion of Chetnik ideology throughout the country.

The final Chetnik ideological document that appeared prior to the Ba Congress in January 1944 was a manual prepared by the Chetnik leadership around the same time as the Conference of Young Chetnik Intellectuals of Montenegro in late 1942. It explained that the Chetniks viewed the war in three phases: the invasion and capitulation by others; a period of organising and waiting until conditions warranted a general uprising against the occupying forces; and finally a general attack on the occupiers and all competitors for power, the Chetnik assumption of complete control over Yugoslavia, the expulsion of most national minorities, and arrest of all internal enemies. Crucially, it identified the two most important tasks during the second phase as: Chetnik-led organisation for the third phase without any party political influences; and incapacitation of their internal enemies, with first priority being the Partisans. Revenge against the Partisans and Ustaše was incorporated into the manual as a "sacred duty".

The manual paid some lip service to Yugoslavism, but the Chetniks did not really wish to become an all-Yugoslav movement because that was inconsistent with their main objective of achieving a Greater Serbia within Greater Yugoslavia. Due to their Serb nationalist stance, they never developed a realistic view of the "national question" in Yugoslavia because they disregarded the legitimate interests of the other Yugoslav peoples. Their ideology was therefore never attractive to non-Serbs except for those Macedonians and Montenegrins who considered themselves Serbs. The only new aspect of the Chetnik Greater Serbia ideology from the long-standing traditional one was their plan to "cleanse" Greater Serbia of non-Serbs, which was clearly a response to the massacres of Serbs by the Ustaše in the NDH.

The final documents detailing Chetnik ideology were produced by the Ba Congress called by Mihailović in January 1944, in response to the November 1943 Second Session of the communist-led Anti-Fascist Council for the National Liberation of Yugoslavia (Serbo-Croatian: Antifašističko vijeće narodnog oslobođenja Jugoslavije, AVNOJ) of the Partisans. The Second Session of AVNOJ had resolved that post-war Yugoslavia would be a federal republic based on six equal constituent republics, asserted that it was the sole legitimate government of Yugoslavia, and denied the right of the King to return from exile before a popular referendum to determine the future of his rule. The month after the Second Session of AVNOJ, the major Allied powers met at Tehran and decided to provide their exclusive support to the Partisans and withdraw support from the Chetniks. The congress was held in circumstances where large parts of the Chetnik movement had been progressively drawn into collaboration with the occupying forces and their helpers over the course of the war, and may have been held with the tacit approval of the Germans.

The document that was produced by the Ba Congress was called The Goals of the Ravna Gora Movement and came in two parts. The first part, The Yugoslav Goals of the Ravna Gora Movement stated that Yugoslavia would be a democratic federation with three units, one each for the Serbs, Croats and Slovenes, and national minorities would be expelled. The second part, The Serbian Goals of the Ravna Gora Movement reinforced the existing Chetnik idea that all Serbian provinces would be united in the Serbian unit within the federal arrangement, based on the solidarity between all Serb regions of Yugoslavia, under a unicameral parliament. The congress also resolved that Yugoslavia should be a constitutional monarchy headed by a Serb sovereign. According to some historians, the new program of the Chetniks was social-democratic Yugoslavism, with a change to a federal Yugoslav structure with a dominant Serb unit, but in asserting the need to gather all Serbs into a single entity, The Serbian Goals of the Ravna Gora Movement was reminiscent of Homogeneous Serbia. The congress also did not recognise Macedonia and Montenegro as separate nations, and also implied that Croatia and Slovenia would effectively be appendages to the Serbian entity. The net effect of this, according to the historian Jozo Tomasevich, was that the country would not only return to the same Serb-dominated state it had been in during the interwar period, but would be worse than that, particularly for the Croats. He concludes that this outcome was to be expected given the overwhelmingly Serb makeup of the congress, which included only two or three Croats, one Slovene and one Bosnian Muslim among its more than 300 attendees. The historian Marko Attila Hoare agrees that despite its superficial Yugoslavism, the congress had clear Greater Serbia inclinations. The congress expressed an interest in reforming the economic, social, and cultural position of the country, particularly regarding democratic ideals. This was a significant departure from previous Chetnik goals expressed earlier in the war, especially in terms of promoting democratic principles with some socialist features. Tomasevich observes that these new goals were probably more related to achieving propaganda objectives than reflecting actual intentions, given that there was no real interest in considering the needs of the non-Serb peoples of Yugoslavia. The practical outcome of the congress was the establishment of a single political party for the movement, the Yugoslav Democratic National Union (Serbo-Croatian: Jugoslovenska demokratska narodna zajednica, JDNZ), and an expansion of the CNK, however the congress did nothing to improve the position of the Chetnik movement.

Beyond the main Serbian irredentist objective, Mihailović's Chetnik movement was an extreme Serb nationalist organisation, and while it paid lip service to Yugoslavism, it was actually opposed to it. It was also anti-Croat, anti-Muslim, supported the monarchy, and was anti-communist. Given the ethnic and religious divisions in Yugoslavia, the narrow ideology of the Chetnik movement seriously impinged on its military and political potential. The political scientist Sabrina Ramet has observed, "Both the Chetniks' political program and the extent of their collaboration have been amply, even voluminously, documented; it is more than a bit disappointing, thus, that people can still be found who believe that the Chetniks were doing anything besides attempting to realize a vision of an ethnically homogeneous Greater Serbian state, which they intended to advance, in the short run, by a policy of collaboration with the Axis forces".

=== Composition and organisation ===
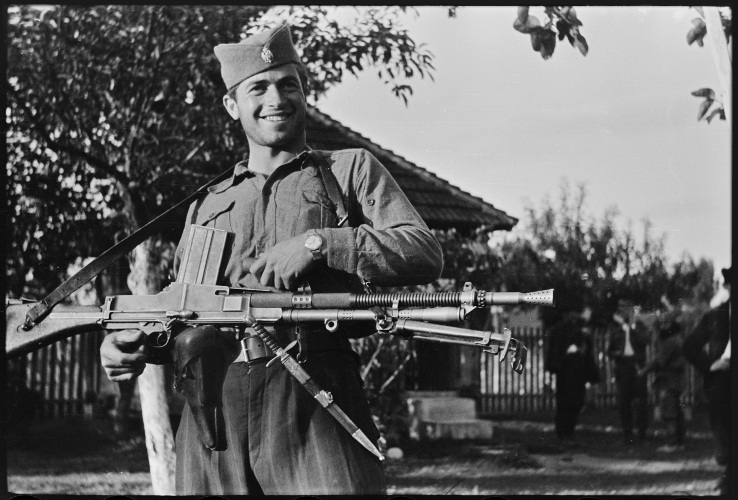
A Chetnik with a M37 light machine gun

The Chetniks were almost exclusively made up of Serbs except for a large number of Montenegrins who identified as Serbs, and consisted of "local defence units, marauding bands of Serb villagers, anti-partisan auxiliaries, forcibly mobilised peasants, and armed refugees, which small groups of uncaptured Yugoslav officers was attempting without success to mold into an organised fighting force". The aforementioned Chetnik manual of late 1942 discussed the idea of enlisting a significant number of Croats for the movement, but the movement only attracted small groups of Chetnik-aligned Croats in central Dalmatia and Primorje, and they were never of any political or military significance within the Chetniks. A small group of Slovenes under Major Karl Novak in the Italian-annexed Province of Ljubljana also supported Mihailović, but they also never played an important role.

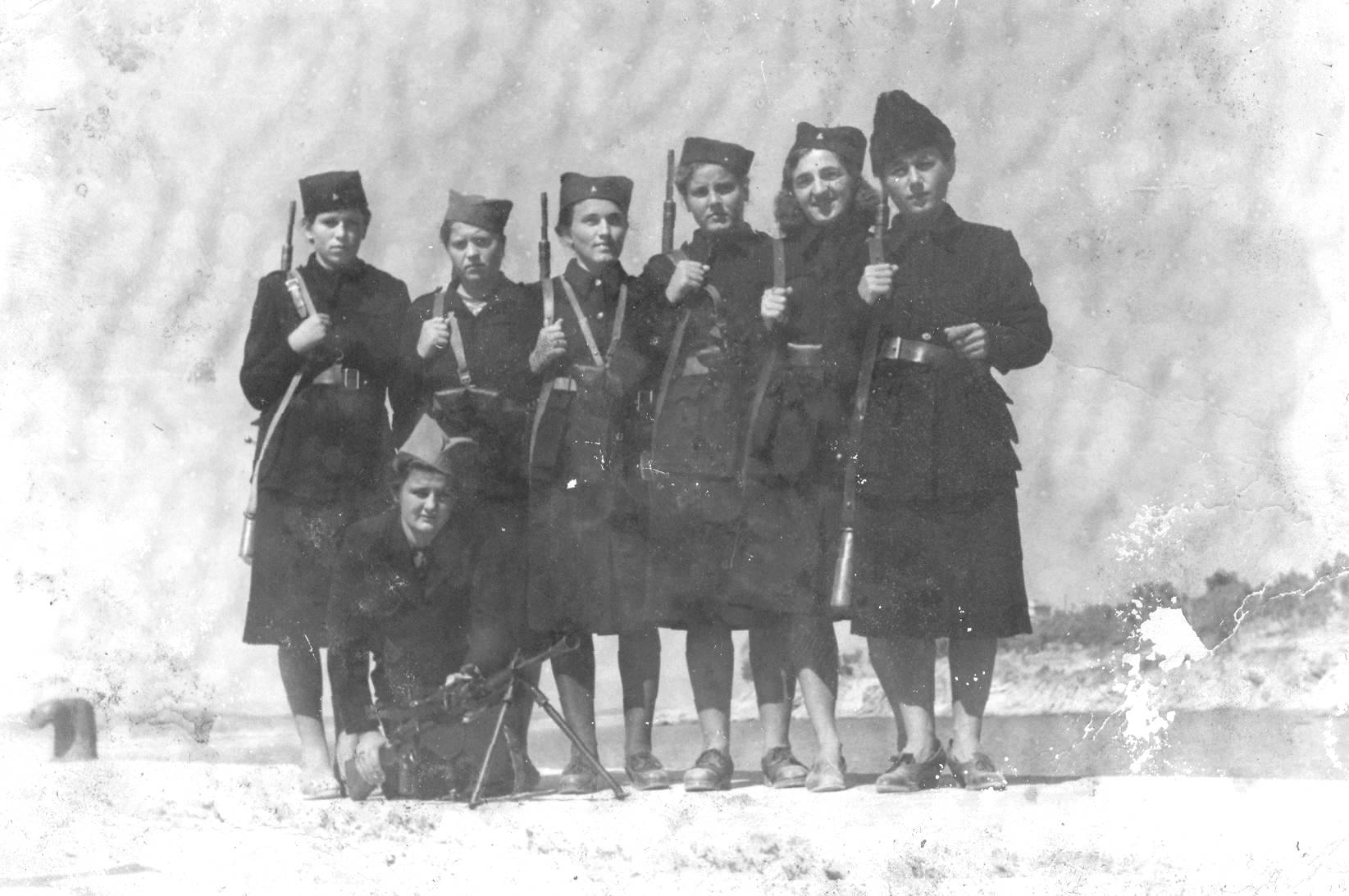
Women in Chetnik units

There had been long standing mutual animosity between Muslims and Serbs throughout Bosnia, and in the period of late April and May 1941, the first Chetnik mass atrocities were carried out against non-Serbs in Bosnia and Herzegovina and in other ethnically heterogeneous areas. A few Sandžak and Bosnian Muslims supported Mihailović, and some Jews joined the Chetniks, especially those who were members of the right-wing Zionist Betar movement, but they were alienated by Serb xenophobia and eventually left, with some defecting to the Partisans. The collaboration of the Chetniks with the Italians and later Germans may have also been a factor in the Jewish rejection of the Chetnik movement. The vast majority of Orthodox priests supported the Chetniks with some, notably Momčilo Đujić and Savo Božić, becoming commanders.

Chetnik policies barred women from performing significant roles. No women took part in fighting units and women were restricted to nursing and occasional intelligence work. The low status of female peasants in areas of Yugoslavia where Chetniks were strongest could have been utilized and advantageous in military, political, and psychological terms. The treatment of women was a fundamental difference between the Chetniks and Partisans and Chetnik propaganda disparaged the female role in the Partisans. Ruth Mitchell (ca. 1889–1969) was a reporter who was the only American woman to serve with the Chetniks. Fluent in German, she worked for the Chetniks as a spy and a courier for about a year.

=== Early activities ===
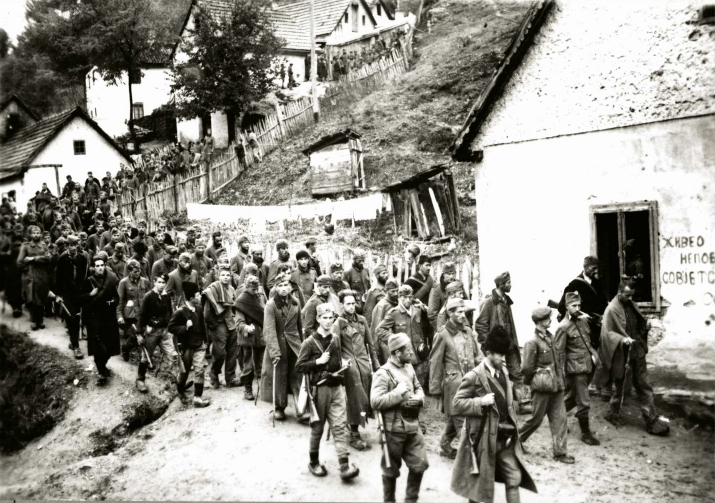
The Chetniks and the Partisans led captured Germans through Užice, autumn 1941.

Initially, Mihailović's organisation was focussed on recruiting and establishing groups in different areas, raising funds, establishing a courier network, and collecting arms and ammunition. From the very beginning their strategy was to organise and build up their strength, but postpone armed operations against the occupation forces until they were withdrawing in the face of a hoped-for landing by the Western Allies in Yugoslavia.

The pre-war Chetnik leader Pećanac soon came to an arrangement with Nedić's collaborationist regime in the Territory of the Military Commander in Serbia. Colonel Draža Mihailović, who was "interested in resisting the occupying powers", set up his headquarters in Ravna Gora and named his group "The Ravna Gora Movement" in order to distinguish it from the Pećanac Chetniks. However, other Chetniks were engaged in collaboration with the Germans and the Chetnik name became again associated with Mihailović.

The movement was later to be renamed the "Yugoslav Army in the Homeland", although the original name of the movement remained the most common in use throughout the war, even among the Chetniks themselves. It is these forces that are generally referred to as "the Chetniks" throughout World War II although the name was also used by other smaller groups including those of Pećanac, Nedić and Dimitrije Ljotić. In June 1941, following the start of Operation Barbarossa, the communist-led Partisans under Josip Broz Tito organised an uprising and in the period between June and November 1941, the Chetniks and Partisans largely cooperated in their anti-Axis activities.

Chetnik uprisings, often in conjunction with the Partisans, against Axis occupation forces began in early July 1941 in Western Serbia. Uprisings in the areas of Loznica, Rogatica, Banja Koviljača and Olovo lead to early victories. On 19 September 1941, Tito and Mihailović met for the first time in Struganik where Tito offered Mihailović the chief-of-staff post in return for the merger of their units. Mihailović refused to attack the Germans, fearing reprisals, but promised to not attack the Partisans. According to Mihailović the reason was humanitarian: the prevention of German reprisals against Serbs at the published rate of 100 civilians for every German soldier killed, 50 civilians for every soldier wounded. On 20 October, Tito proposed a 12-point program to Mihailović as the basis of cooperation. Six days later, Tito and Mihailović met at Mihailović's headquarters where Mihailović rejected principal points of Tito's proposal including the establishment of common headquarters, joint military actions against the Germans and quisling formations, establishment of a combined staff for the supply of troops, and the formation of national liberation committees. These disagreements lead to uprisings being quashed in Montenegro and Novi Pazar due to poor coordination between the resistance forces. Mihailović's fears for ongoing reprisals became a reality with two mass murder campaigns conducted against Serb civilians in Kraljevo and Kragujevac, reaching a combined death toll of over 4,500 civilians. Killings in the Independent State of Croatia were also in full swing with thousands of Serb civilians being killed by the Ustaše militia and death squads. In late October, Mihailović concluded the Partisans, rather than Axis forces, were the primary enemies of the Chetniks.

To avoid reprisals against Serb civilians, Mihailović's Chetniks fought as a guerrilla force, rather than a regular army. It has been estimated that three-quarters of the Orthodox clergy in occupied Yugoslavia supported the Chetniks, while some like Momčilo Đujić became prominent Chetnik commanders. While the Partisans opted for overt acts of sabotage that led to reprisals against civilians by Axis forces, the Chetniks opted for a more subtle form of resistance. Instead of detonating TNT to destroy railway tracks and disrupt Axis railway lines, Chetniks contaminated railway fuel sources and tampered with mechanical components, ensuring trains would either derail or breakdown at random times. Martin suggests that these acts of sabotage significantly crippled supplies lines for the Afrika Korps fighting in North Africa.

On 2 November, Mihailović's Chetniks attacked Partisan headquarters in Užice. The attack was driven back and a counterattack followed the next day, the Chetniks lost 1,000 men in these two battles and a large amount of weaponry. On 18 November, Mihailović accepted a truce offer from Tito though attempts to establish a common front failed. That month, the British government, upon the request of the Yugoslav government-in-exile, insisted Tito make Mihailović the commander-in-chief of resistance forces in Yugoslavia, a demand he refused.

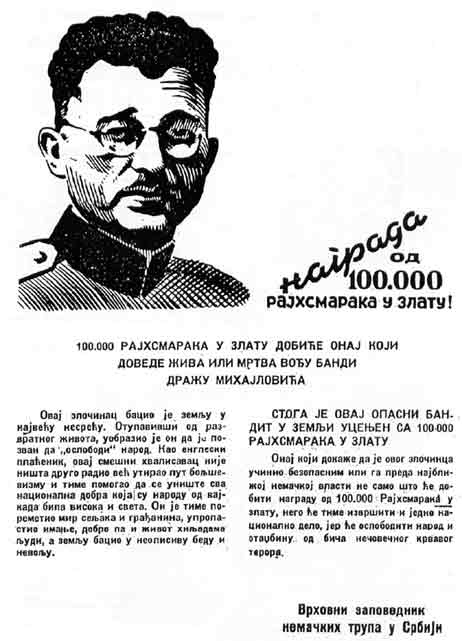
German warrant for Mihailović offering a reward of 100,000 gold marks for his capture, dead or alive, 1943

Partisan-Chetnik truces were repeatedly violated by the Chetniks, first with the killing of a local Partisan commander in October and then later, under orders of Mihailović's staff, massacring 30 Partisan supporters, mostly girls and wounded individuals, in November. Despite this, Chetniks and Partisans in eastern Bosnia continued to cooperate for some time.

In December 1941 the Yugoslav government-in-exile in London under King Peter II promoted Mihailović to Brigadier-General and named him commander of the Yugoslav Home Army. By this time Mihailović had established friendly relations with Nedić and his Government of National Salvation and the Germans who he requested weaponry from to fight the Partisans. This was rejected by General Franz Böhme who stated they could deal with the Partisans themselves and demanded Mihailović's surrender. Around this time the Germans launched an attack on Mihailović's forces in Ravna Gora and effectively routed the Chetniks from the Territory of the Military Commander in Serbia. The bulk of the Chetnik forces retreated into eastern Bosnia and Sandžak and the centre of Chetnik activity moved to the Independent State of Croatia. The British liaison to Mihailović advised Allied command to stop supplying the Chetniks after their attacks on the Partisans in the German attack on Užice, but Britain continued to do so.

Throughout the period of 1941 and 1942, both the Chetniks and Partisans provided refugee for Allied POWs, especially ANZAC troops who escaped from railway carriages en route via Yugoslavia to Axis POW camps. According to Lawrence, following the Allied defeat at the Battle of Crete, POWs were transported via Yugoslavia in railway carriages with some ANZAC troops escaping in occupied Serbia. Chetniks under the command of Mihailović provided refugee to these ANZAC troops and were either repatriated or recaptured by Axis forces.

=== Axis offensives ===
In April 1942 the Communists in Bosnia established two Shock Anti-Chetnik Battalions (Grmeč and Kozara) composed of 1,200 best soldiers of Serb ethnicity to struggle against Chetniks. Later during the war, the Allies were seriously considering an invasion of the Balkans, so the Yugoslav resistance movements increased in strategic importance, and there was a need to determine which of the two factions was fighting the Germans. A number of Special Operations Executive (SOE) agents were sent to Yugoslavia to determine the facts on the ground. According to new archival evidence, published in 1980 for the first time, some actions against Axis carried by Mihailović and his Chetniks, with British liaison officer Brigadier Armstrong, were mistakenly credited to Tito and his Communist forces. In the meantime, the Germans, also aware of the growing importance of Yugoslavia, decided to wipe out the Partisans with determined offensives. The Chetniks, by this time, had agreed to provide support for the German operations, and were in turn granted supplies and munitions to increase their effectiveness.

The first of these large anti-Partisan offensives was Fall Weiss, also known as the Battle of Neretva. The Chetniks participated with a significant, 20,000-strong, force providing assistance to the German and Italian encirclement from the east (the far bank of the river Neretva). However, Tito's Partisans managed to break through the encirclement, cross the river, and engage the Chetniks. The conflict resulted in a near-total Partisan victory, after which the Chetniks were almost entirely incapacitated in the area west of the Drina river. The Partisans continued on, and later again escaped the Germans in the Battle of Sutjeska. In the meantime, the Allies stopped planning an invasion of the Balkans and finally rescinded their support for the Chetniks and instead supplied the Partisans. At the Teheran Conference of 1943 and the Yalta Conference of 1945, Soviet leader Joseph Stalin and British Prime Minister Winston Churchill decided to split their influence in Yugoslavia in half.

=== Axis collaboration ===
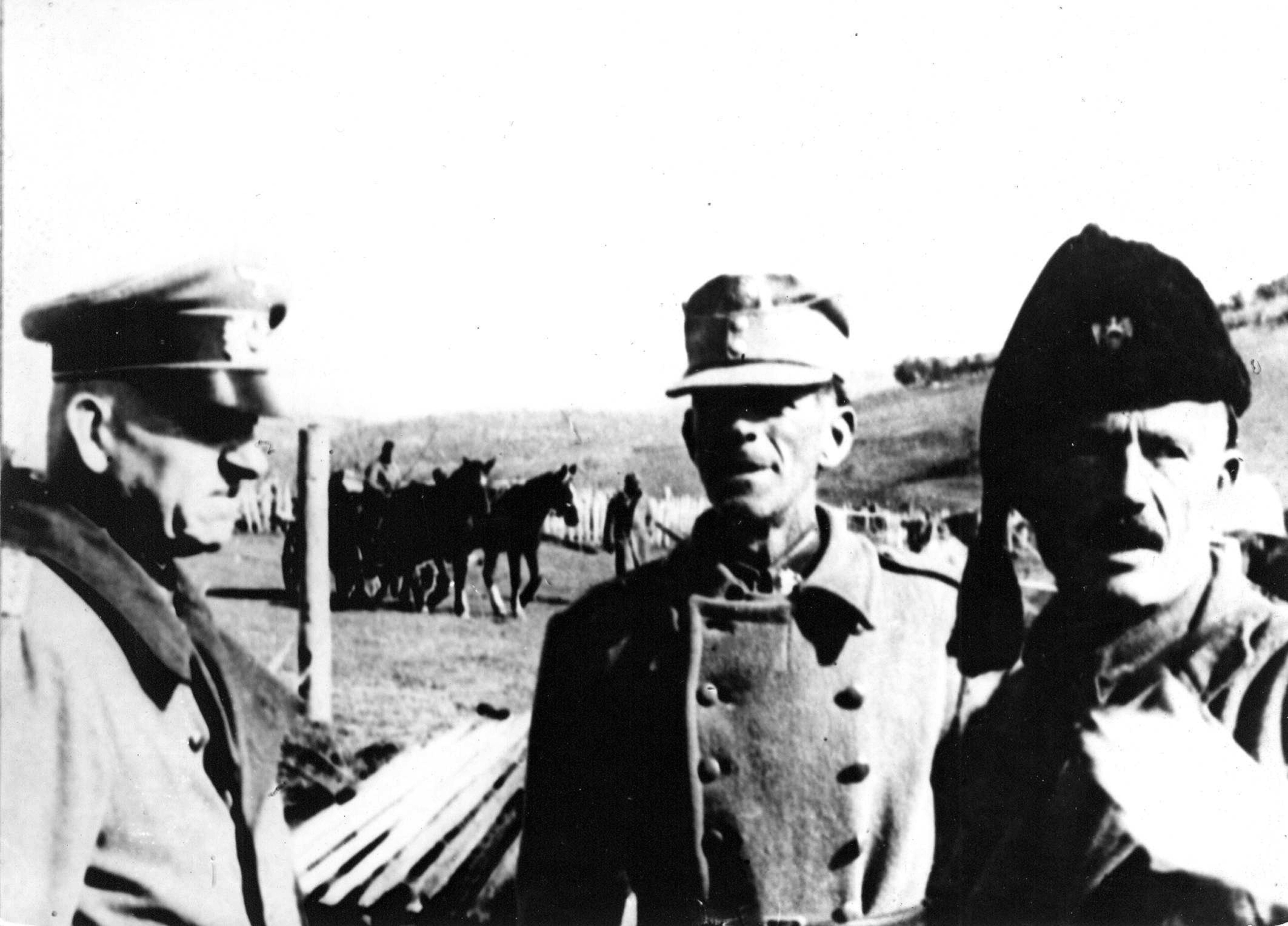
German Generalmajor (Brigadier) Friedrich Stahl stands alongside an Ustaše officer and Chetnik commander Rade Radić in central Bosnia in mid–1942.

Throughout the war, the Chetnik movement remained mostly inactive against the occupation forces, and increasingly collaborated with the Axis, eventually losing its international recognition as the Yugoslav resistance force. After a brief initial period of cooperation, the Partisans and the Chetniks quickly started fighting against each other. Gradually, the Chetniks ended up primarily fighting the Partisans instead of the occupation forces, and started cooperating with the Axis in a struggle to destroy the Partisans, receiving increasing amounts of logistical assistance. Mihailović admitted to a British colonel that the Chetniks' principal enemies were "the partisans, the Ustasha, the Muslims, the Croats and last the Germans and Italians" [in that order].

At the start of the conflict, Chetnik forces were active in uprising against the Axis occupation and had contacts and negotiations with the Partisans. This changed when the talks broke down, and they proceeded to attack the latter (who were actively fighting the Germans), while continuing to engage the Axis only in minor skirmishes. Attacking the Germans provoked strong retaliation and the Chetniks increasingly started to negotiate with them to stop further bloodshed. Negotiations with the occupiers were aided by the two sides' mutual goal of destroying the Partisans. This collaboration first appeared during the operations on the Partisan "Užice Republic", where Chetniks played a part in the general Axis attack.

==== Collaboration with the Italians ====
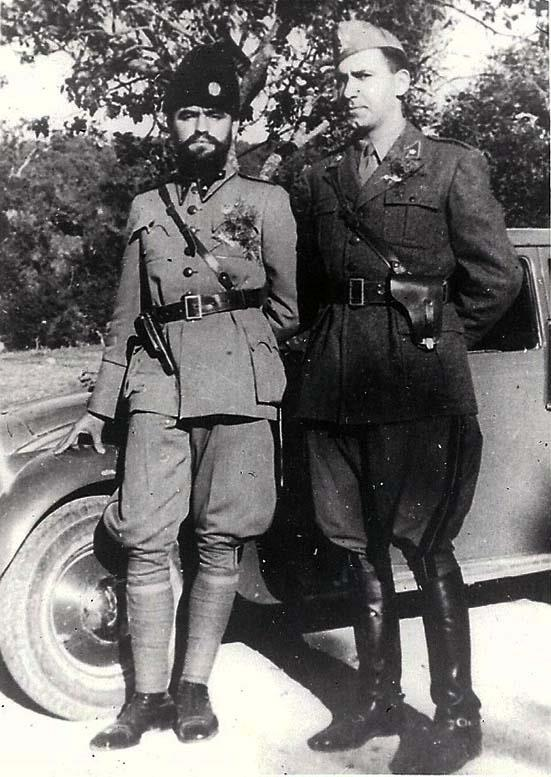
Chetnik commander Momčilo Đujić (left) with an Italian officer

Chetnik collaboration with the occupation forces of fascist Italy took place in three main areas: in Italian-occupied (and Italian-annexed) Dalmatia; in the Italian puppet state of Montenegro; and in the Italian-annexed and later German-occupied Ljubljana Province in Slovenia. The collaboration in Dalmatia and parts of Bosnia and Herzegovina was the most widespread. The split between Partisans and Chetniks took place earlier in those areas.

The Partisans considered all occupation forces to be "the fascist enemy", while the Chetniks hated the Ustaše but balked at fighting the Italians, and had approached the Italian VI Army Corps (General Renzo Dalmazzo, Commander) as early as July and August 1941 for assistance, via a Serb politician from Lika, Stevo Rađenović. In particular, Chetnik vojvodas ("leaders") Trifunović-Birčanin and Jevđević were favorably disposed towards the Italians, believing Italian occupation over all of Bosnia-Herzegovina would be detrimental to the influence of the Ustaše state. Another reason for collaboration was a necessity to protect Serbs from the Ustaše and Balli Kombëtar. When the Balli Kombëtar earmarked the Visoki Dečani monastery for destruction, Italian troops were sent in to protect the Orthodox monastery from destruction and highlighted to the Chetniks the necessity for collaboration.

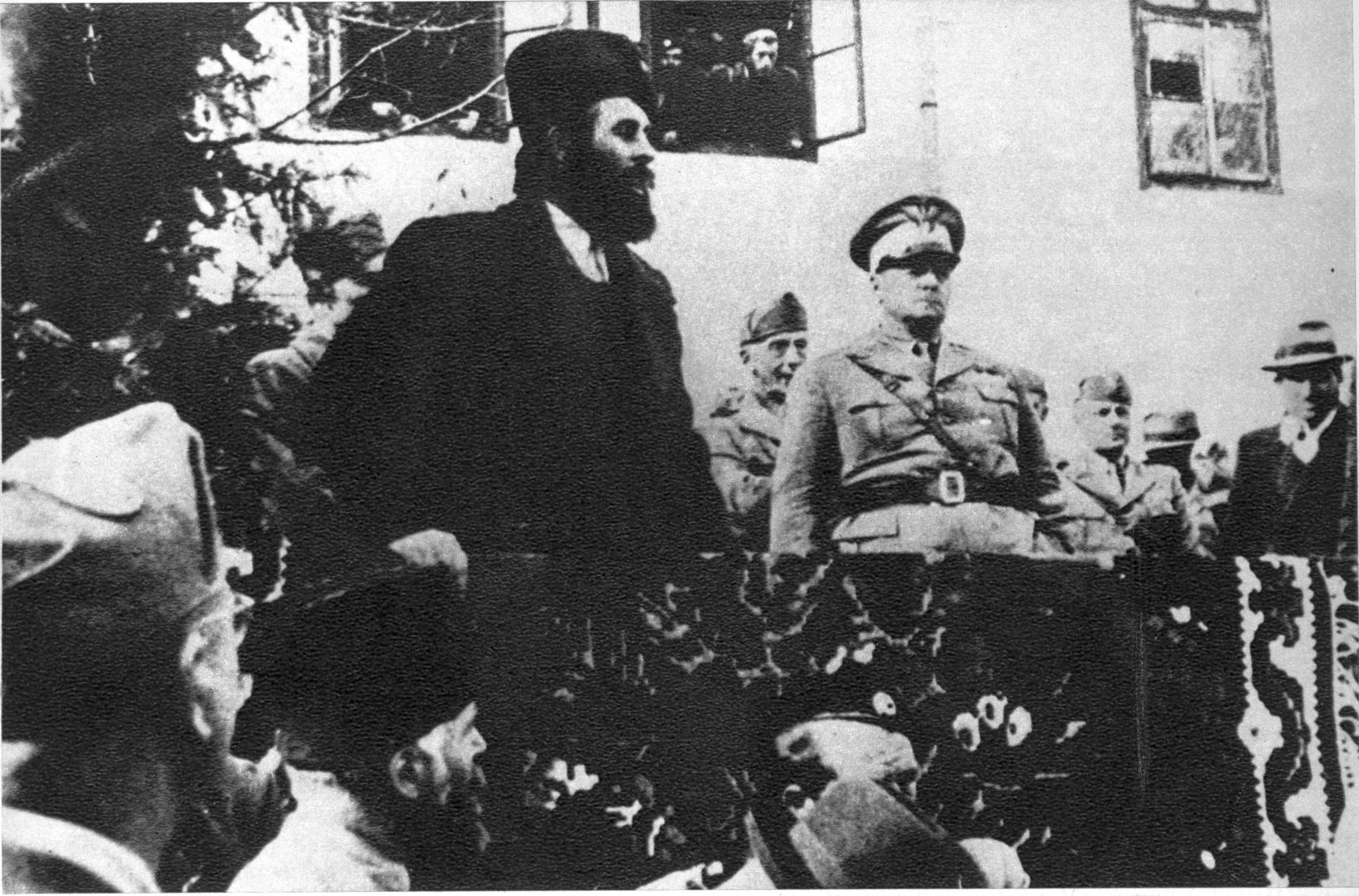
Chetnik commander Pavle Đurišić (left) making a speech to the Chetniks in the presence of General Pirzio Biroli, Italian governor of Montenegro

For this reason, they sought an alliance with the Italian occupation forces in Yugoslavia. The Chetniks noticed that Italy on occupied territories implemented a traditional policy of deceiving Croats with the help of Serbs and they believed that Italy, in case of victory of the Axis powers, would favor Serbs in Lika, northern Dalmatia and Bosnia and Herzegovina and that Serbian autonomy would be created in this area under Italian protectorate. The Italians (especially General Dalmazzo) looked favorably on these approaches and hoped to first avoid fighting the Chetniks, and then use them against the Partisans, a strategy which they thought would give them an "enormous advantage". An agreement was concluded on 11 January 1942 between the representative of the Italian 2nd Army, Captain Angelo De Matteis and the Chetnik representative for southeastern Bosnia, Mutimir Petković, and was later signed by Draža Mihailović's chief delegate in Bosnia, Major Boško Todorović. Among other provisions of the agreement, it was agreed that the Italians would support Chetnik formations with arms and provisions, and would facilitate the release of "recommended individuals" from Axis concentration camps (Jasenovac, Rab, etc.). The chief interest of both the Chetniks and Italians would be to assist each other in combating Partisan-led resistance. According to Martin, the Chetnik-Italian truce received approval from British Intelligence as it was seen as a way of garnering intelligence. Birčanin was instructed to gather information on harbor facilities, troop movements, mining operations and Axis communications in preparation for an Allied invasion of the Dubrovnik coast scheduled for 1943, an invasion that never eventuated.

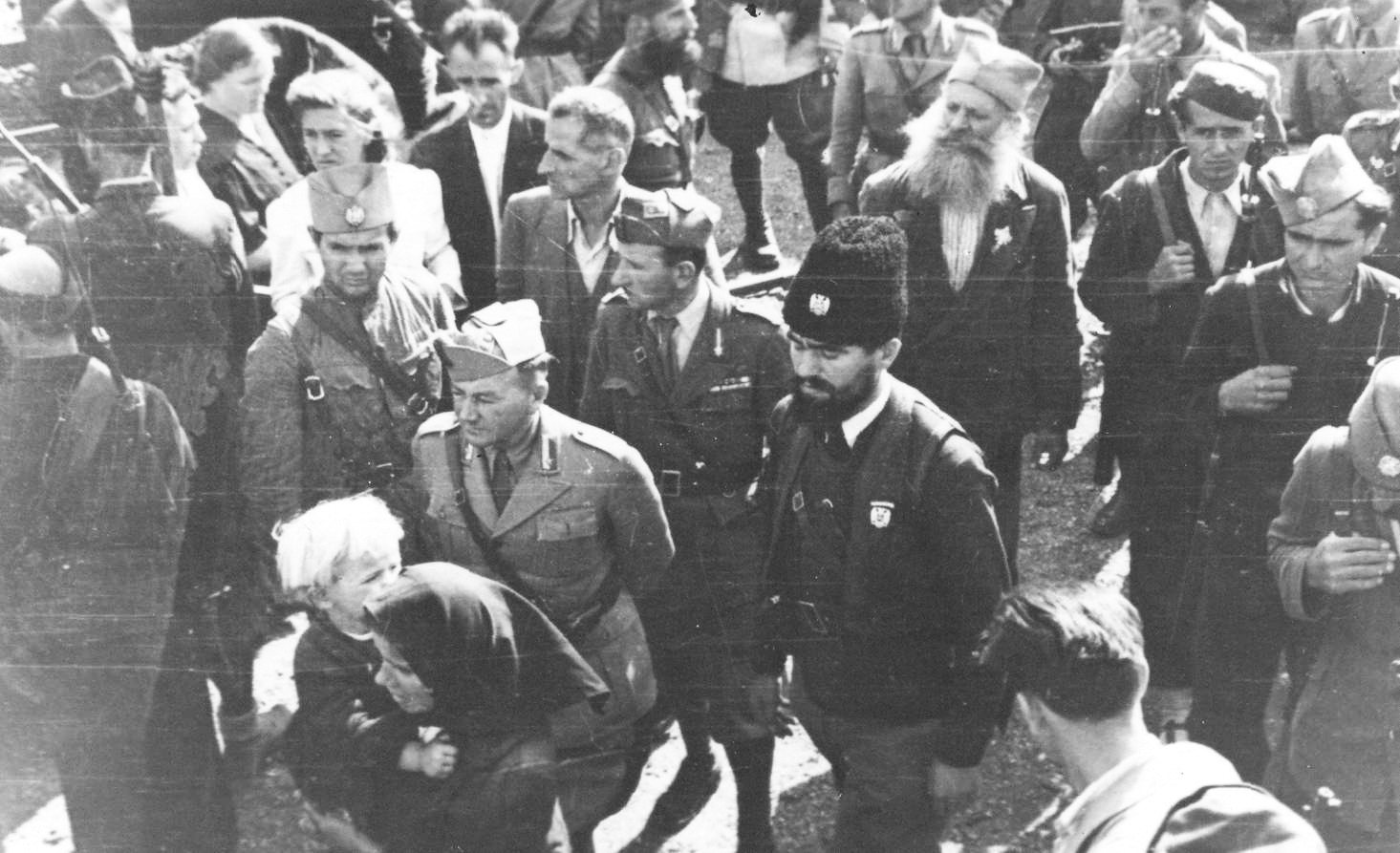
Momčilo Đujić with Chetniks and Italians

In the following months of 1942, General Mario Roatta, commander of the Italian 2nd Army, worked on developing a Linea di condotta ("Policy Directive") on relations with Chetniks, Ustaše and Partisans. In line with these efforts, General Vittorio Ambrosio outlined the Italian policy in Yugoslavia: All negotiations with the (quisling) Ustaše were to be avoided, but contacts with the Chetniks were "advisable". As for the Partisans, it was to be "struggle to the bitter end". This meant that General Roatta was essentially free to take action with regard to the Chetniks as he saw fit. In April 1942 Chetniks and Italians cooperated in battles with Partisans around Knin.

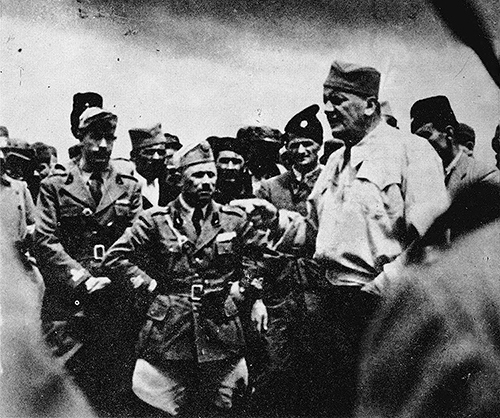
Chetnik commander Dobroslav Jevđević conferring with Italian officers in February 1943

He outlined the four points of his policy in his report to the Italian Army General Staff:

To support the Chetniks sufficiently to make them fight against the communists, but not so much as to allow them too much latitude in their own action; to demand and assure that the Chetniks do not fight against the Croatian forces and authorities; to allow them to fight against the communists on their own initiative (so that they can "slaughter each other"); and finally to allow them to fight in parallel with the Italian and German forces, as do the nationalist bands [Chetniks and separatist Greens] in Montenegro.

— General Mario Roatta, 1942

In 1942 and 1943, an overwhelming proportion of Chetnik forces in the Italian-controlled areas of occupied Yugoslavia were organized as Italian auxiliary forces in the form of the Anti-Communist Volunteer Militia (Milizia Volontaria Anti Comunista, MVAC). According to General Giacomo Zanussi (then a Colonel and Roatta's chief of staff), there were 19,000 to 20,000 Chetniks in the MVAC in Italian-occupied parts of the Independent State of Croatia alone. The Chetniks were extensively supplied with thousands of rifles, grenades, mortars and artillery pieces. In a memorandum dated 26 March 1943 to the Italian Army General Staff, entitled "The Conduct of the Chetniks".

The allegiance between the Chetniks and Italians was crucial in protecting Serbs in the Lika and Dalmatian region from ongoing attacks from the Ustaše. Italian forces provided Serb civilians with weapons to protect their villages and accommodated thousands of Serb civilians escaping the ongoing genocide of Serbs in the Independent State of Croatia. Đujić used these events as a way of justifying the allegiance and when ordered by Mihailović in February 1943 to break this allegiance, Đujić refused and stated that a break in a truce would mean certain death to tens of thousands of Serb civilians.

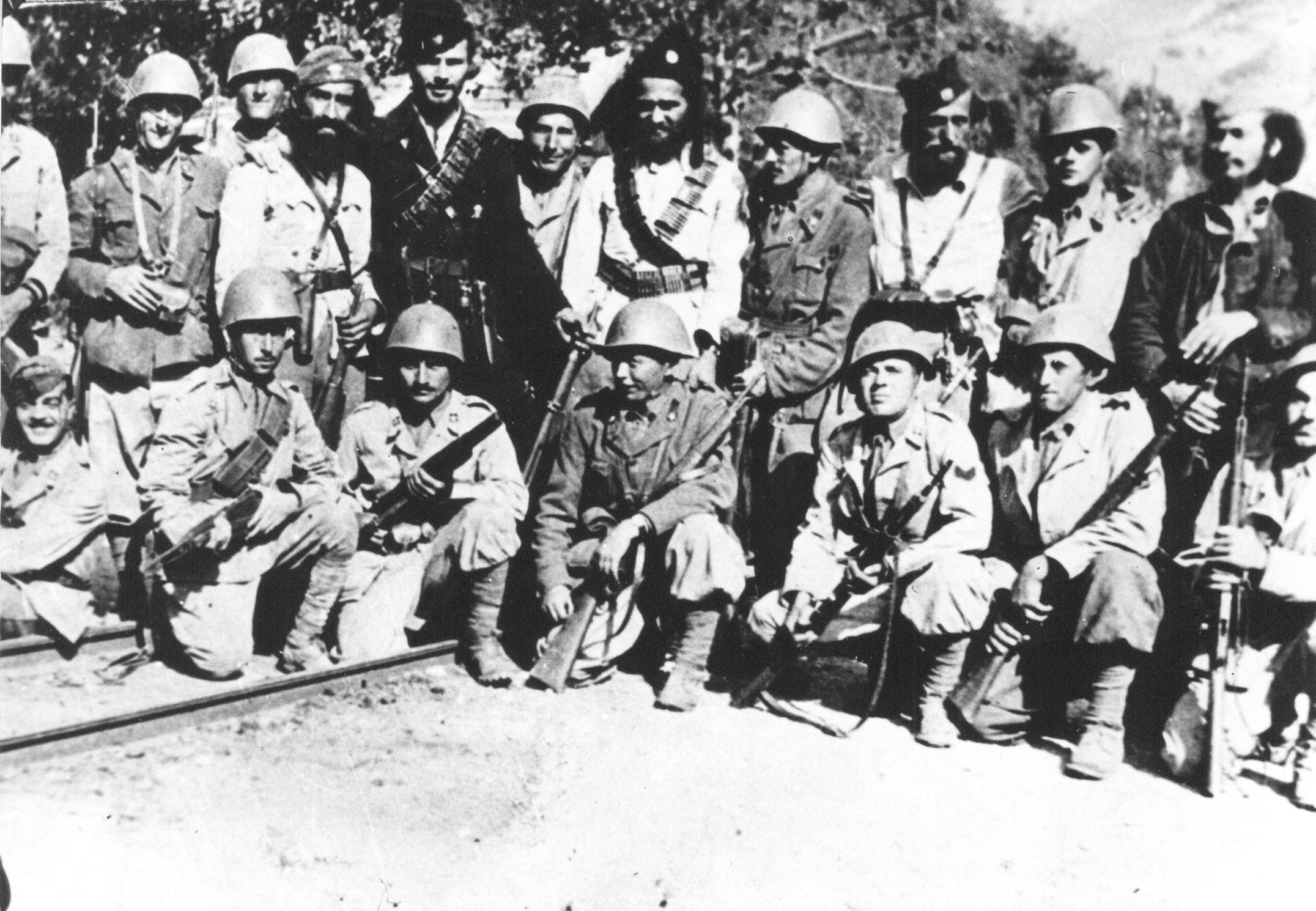
Chetniks and Italians in Jablanica in 1943

Italian officers noted the ultimate control of these collaborating Chetnik units remained in the hands of Draža Mihailović, and contemplated the possibility of a hostile reorientation of these troops in light of the changing strategic situation. The commander of these troops was Trifunović-Birčanin, who arrived in Italian-annexed Split in October 1941 and received his orders directly from Mihailović in the spring of 1942. By the time Italy capitulated on 8 September 1943, all Chetnik detachments in the Italian-controlled parts of the Independent State of Croatia had, at one time or another, collaborated with the Italians against the Partisans. This collaboration lasted right up until the Italian capitulation when Chetnik troops switched to supporting the German occupation in trying to force the Partisans out of the coastal cities which the Partisans liberated after the Italian withdrawal. After the Allies did not land in Dalmatia as they had hoped, these Chetnik detachments entered into collaboration with the Germans in order to avoid being caught between the Germans and the Partisans.

==== Collaboration with the Independent State of Croatia ====
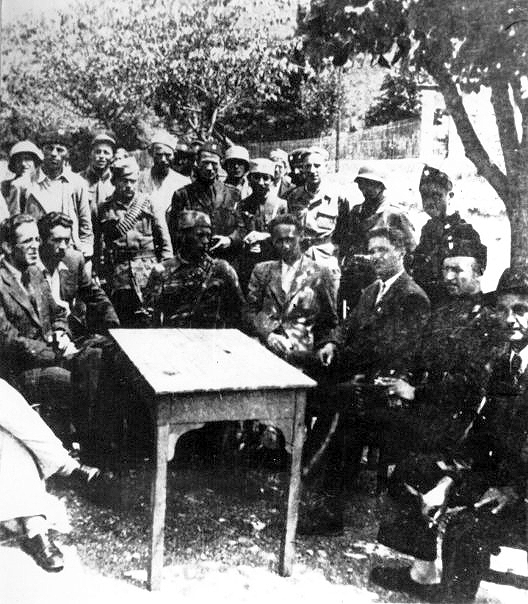
Chetnik representatives meeting in Bosnia with Ustaše and Croatian Home Guard officers of the Independent State of Croatia

The Chetnik groups were in fundamental disagreement with the Ustaše on practically all issues, but they found a common enemy in the Partisans, and this was the overriding reason for the collaboration which ensued between the Ustaše authorities of the NDH and Chetnik detachments in Bosnia. Agreement between commander major Emil Rataj and commander of Chetnik organizations in the Mrkonjić Grad area Uroš Drenović was signed on 27 April 1942 after heavy defeat in the conflict with Kozara Partisan battalion. Contracting parties obliged to a joint struggle against the Partisans, in return, Serb villages would be protected by the NDH authorities together with the Chetniks from "attacks by communists, so-called Partisans". Chetnik commanders between Vrbas and Sana on 13 May 1942, gave a written confession to the NDH authorities about cessation of hostilities and that they would voluntarily take part in the fight against the Partisans.

In Banja Luka two days later was signed agreement on the cessation of hostilities against the Chetniks in the area between Vrbas and Sana and on the withdrawal of Home Guard units from this area, between Petar Gvozdić and Chetnik commanders Lazar Tešanović (Chetnik detachment "Obilić") and Cvetko Aleksić (Chetnik detachment "Mrkonjić"). After several signed agreements, Chetnik commanders at a meeting near Kotor Varoš concluded that the remaining Chetnik detachments would also sign such agreements because they realized that such agreements had great benefits for the Chetnik movement. NDH authorities during May and June 1942, signed such agreements and with some east Bosnian Chetniks detachments. Commandant of Ozren Chetnik detachment Cvijetin Todić requested a meeting to reach an agreement with representatives of the NDH authorities. Ante Pavelic appointed persons for these negotiations and he gave these conditions: that they return to homes, hand over weapons and be loyal to the authorities of NDH. In return, it was promised that every Serbian village would receive weapons to fight the Partisans, that they would get state employment, and those Chetniks who stood out in the fight against the Partisans would receive decorations and awards. Ozren and Trebava Chetnik detachments signed this agreement on 28 May 1942. On 30 May 1942, the Majevica Chetnik detachment signed the agreement with an important novelty; Chetniks from the area of Ozren and Trebava were given "self-governing power" i.e. autonomy which would be performed by the Chetniks' commanders. An almost identical agreement was signed on 14 June 1942 with the Zenica Chetnik detachment. In the later period similar agreements were signed with Chetnik detachments in the area of Lika and northern Dalmatia.

During the next three weeks, three additional agreements were signed, covering a large part of the area of Bosnia (comprising the Chetnik detachments within it). By the provision of these agreements, the Chetniks were to cease hostilities against the Ustaše state, and the Ustaše would establish regular administration in these areas. According to report of Edmund Glaise-Horstenau from 26 February 1944 based on official NDH data, in the NDH territory existed thirty five Chetnik groups of which nineteen groups with 17,500 men collaborated with Croatian and German authorities while as rebel Chetniks existed sixteen groups with 5,800-man. The Chetniks recognized the sovereignty of the Independent State of Croatia and became a legalized movement in it. The main provision, Art. 5 of the agreement, stated as follows:

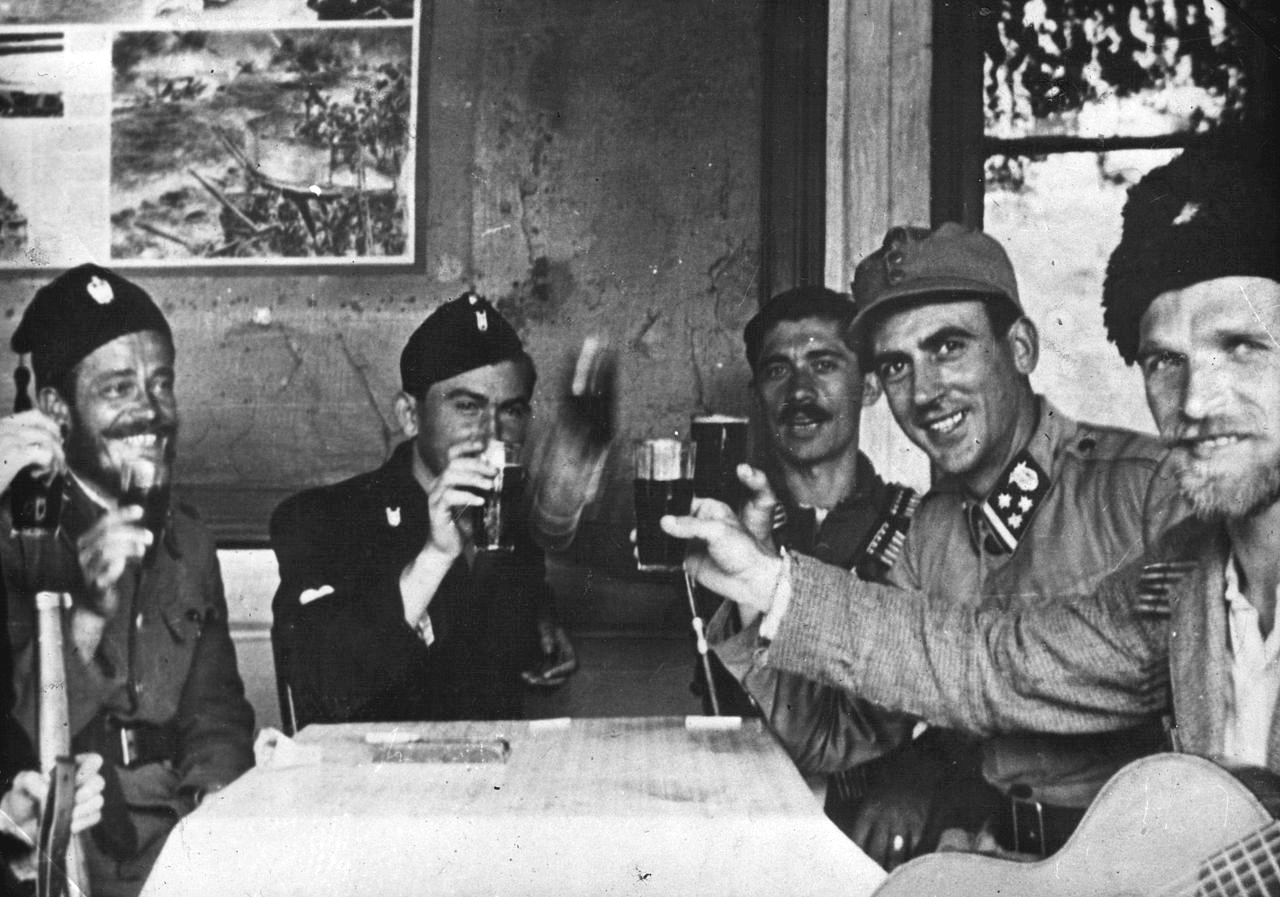
Chetnik commander Uroš Drenović (far left) drinking with Croatian Home Guard and Ustaše troops

As long as there is danger from the Partisan armed bands, the Chetnik formations will cooperate voluntarily with the Croatian military in fighting and destroying the Partisans and in those operations they will be under the overall command of the Croatian armed forces. (... ) Chetnik formations may engage in operations against the Partisans on their own, but this they will have to report, on time, to the Croatian military commanders.

— Chetnik-Ustaše collaboration agreement, 28 May 1942

Military and political expediency best explained these agreements, as historian Enver Redžić notes: "The Ustasha-Chetnik accords were driven neither by a confluence of Serbian and Croatian national interests nor by mutual desire for acceptance and respect, but rather because each side needed to obstruct Partisan advances." The agreements did not stop crimes against Serbs by the Ustaše or against Muslims and Croats by the Chetniks. They persisted in areas where the other had control and in regions where no agreements existed.

The necessary ammunition and provisions were supplied to the Chetniks by the Ustaše military. Chetniks who were wounded in such operations would be cared for in NDH hospitals, while the orphans and widows of Chetniks killed in action would be supported by the Ustaše state. Persons specifically recommended by Chetnik commanders would be returned home from the Ustaše concentration camps. These agreements covered the majority of Chetnik forces in Bosnia east of the German-Italian demarcation line, and lasted throughout most of the war. Since Croatian forces were immediately subordinate to the German military occupation, collaboration with Croatian forces was, in fact, indirect collaboration with the Germans.

Although the Dinara Division under the command of Đujić received support from the NDH, Chetniks under the command of Mihailović refused to collaborate with the NDH. Throughout the war Mihailović continued to refer to the NDH as an enemy and engaged Ustaše forces in the Serbian border areas. Mihailović's animosity towards the Ustaše was due to the ongoing genocidal policies of the NDH against the Serb population and other minority groups.

Fleeing the Partisans, in March 1945 Pavle Đurišić negotiated an agreement with the Ustaše and Ustaše-supported Montenegrin separatist, Sekula Drljević, to provide safe conduct for his Chetniks across the NDH. The Ustaše agreed to this, but when the Chetniks failed to follow the agreed-upon withdrawal route, the Ustaše attacked the Chetniks at Lijevče Field, afterward killing the captured commanders, while the remaining Chetniks continued to withdraw to Austria with the NDH army and under their military command.

Ustaše leader, Ante Pavelić ordered the NDH military to give Momčilo Đujić and his Dinara Division Chetniks "orderly and unimpeded passage", with which Đujić and his forces fled across the NDH to Slovenia and Italy. In early May 1945 Chetnik forces withdrew through Ustaše-held Zagreb; many of these were later killed, along with captured Ustaše, by the Partisans as part of the Bleiburg repatriations.

==== Operation Weiss ====
One major Chetnik collaboration with the Axis took place during the "Battle of the Neretva", the final phase of "Operation Weiss", known in Yugoslav historiography as the "Fourth Enemy Offensive". In 1942, Partisans forces were on the rise, having established large liberated territories within Bosnia and Herzegovina. The Germans began planning an offensive against the Partisans, aiming to destroy their supreme headquarters. After destroying Partisan-held territories in Bosnia and Croatia, the final phase of the operation called for the Italians to disarm the Chetniks while simultaneously conducting operations against the Partisans. In spite of Hitler's insistence, Italian forces in the end refused to disarm the Chetniks (thus rendering that course of action impossible). An agreement between German general Alexander Löhr and Italian general Mario Roatta on 8 February 1943 included Mihailović's Chetniks in the operations and gave them material assistance along with weapons and ammunitions.

==== Collaboration with the Germans ====
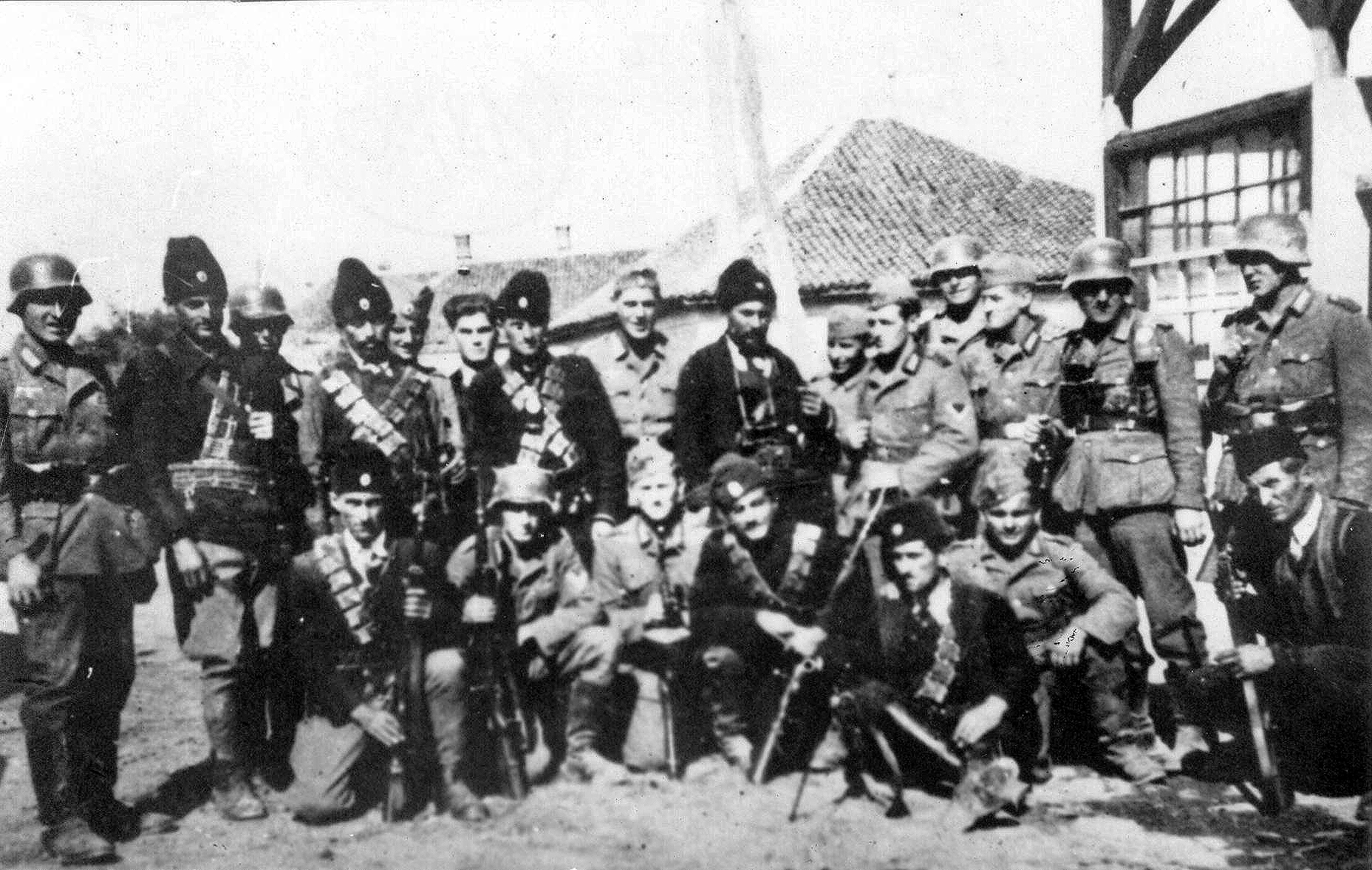
A group of Chetniks pose with German soldiers in an unidentified village in Serbia

When Germans invaded Yugoslavia they met in the Chetniks an organization trained and adapted for guerrilla warfare. Although there were some clashes between the Germans and the Chetniks as early as May 1941, Mihailović thought of resistance in terms of setting up an organisation which, when the time was ripe, would rise against the occupying forces. British policy with regard to European resistance movements was to restrain them from activities which would lead to their premature destruction, and this policy coincided initially with the concepts on the basis of which Mihailović's movement was being operated. In order to dissociate himself from the Chetniks who collaborated with the Germans, Mihailović at first called its movement the "Ravna Gora Movement".

As early as spring 1942, the Germans favored the collaboration agreement the Ustaše and the Chetniks had established in a large part of Bosnia and Herzegovina. Since the Ustaše military was supplied by, and immediately subordinate to, the German military occupation, collaboration between the two constituted indirect German-Chetnik collaboration. This was all favorable to the Germans primarily because the agreement was directed against the Partisans, contributed to the pacification of areas significant for German war supplies, and reduced the need for additional German occupation troops (as Chetniks were assisting the occupation). After the Italian capitulation on 8 September 1943, the German 114th Jäger Division even incorporated a Chetnik detachment in its advance to retake the Adriatic coast from the Partisans who had temporarily liberated it. The report on German-Chetnik collaboration of the XV Army Corps on 19 November 1943 to the 2nd Panzer Army states that the Chetniks were "leaning on the German forces" for close to a year.

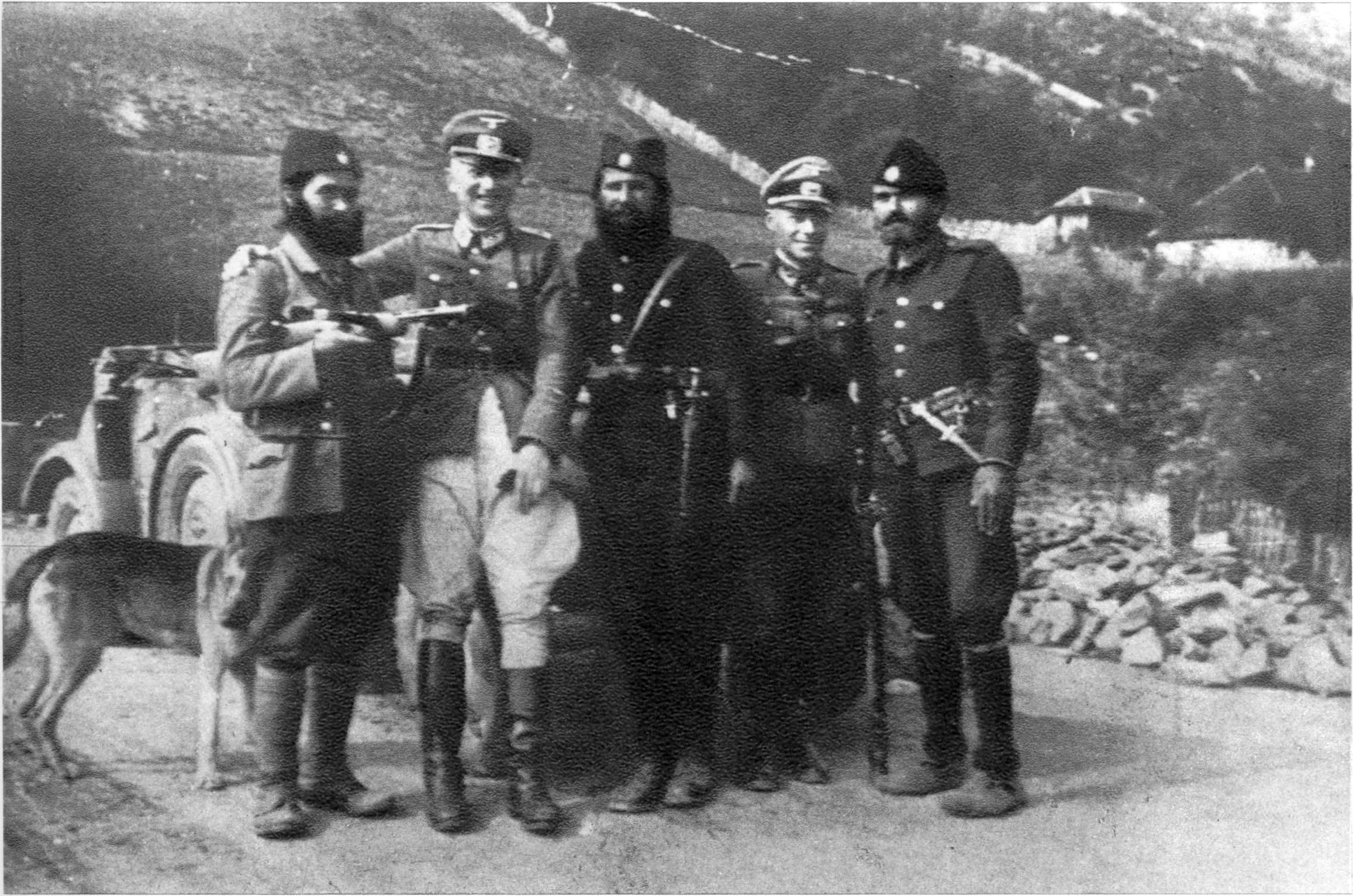
A group of Chetniks pose with German officers

German-Chetnik collaboration entered a new phase after the Italian surrender, because the Germans now had to police a much larger area than before and fight the Partisans in the whole of Yugoslavia. Consequently, they significantly liberalized their policy towards the Chetniks and mobilized all Serb nationalist forces against the Partisans. The 2nd Panzer Army oversaw these developments: the XV Army Corps was now officially allowed to utilize Chetniks troops and forge a "local alliance". The first formal and direct agreement between the German occupation forces and the Chetniks took place in early October 1943 between the German-led 373rd (Croatian) Infantry Division and a detachment of Chetniks under Mane Rokvić operating in western Bosnia and Lika. The Germans subsequently even used Chetnik troops for guard duty in occupied Split, Dubrovnik, Šibenik, and Metković.

NDH troops were not used, despite Ustaše demands, as mass desertions of Croat troops to the Partisans rendered them unreliable. From this point on, the German occupation actually started to "openly favor" Chetnik (Serb) troops over the Croat formations of the NDH, due to the pro-Partisan dispositions of the Croatian rank-and-file. The Germans paid little attention to frequent Ustaše protests about this.

Ustaše Major Mirko Blaž (Deputy Commander, 7th Brigade of the Poglavnik's Personal Guard) observed that:

The Germans are not interested in politics, they take everything from a military point of view. They need troops that can hold certain positions and clear certain areas of the Partisans. If they ask us to do it, we cannot do it. The Chetniks can.

— Major Mirko Blaž, 5 March 1944.

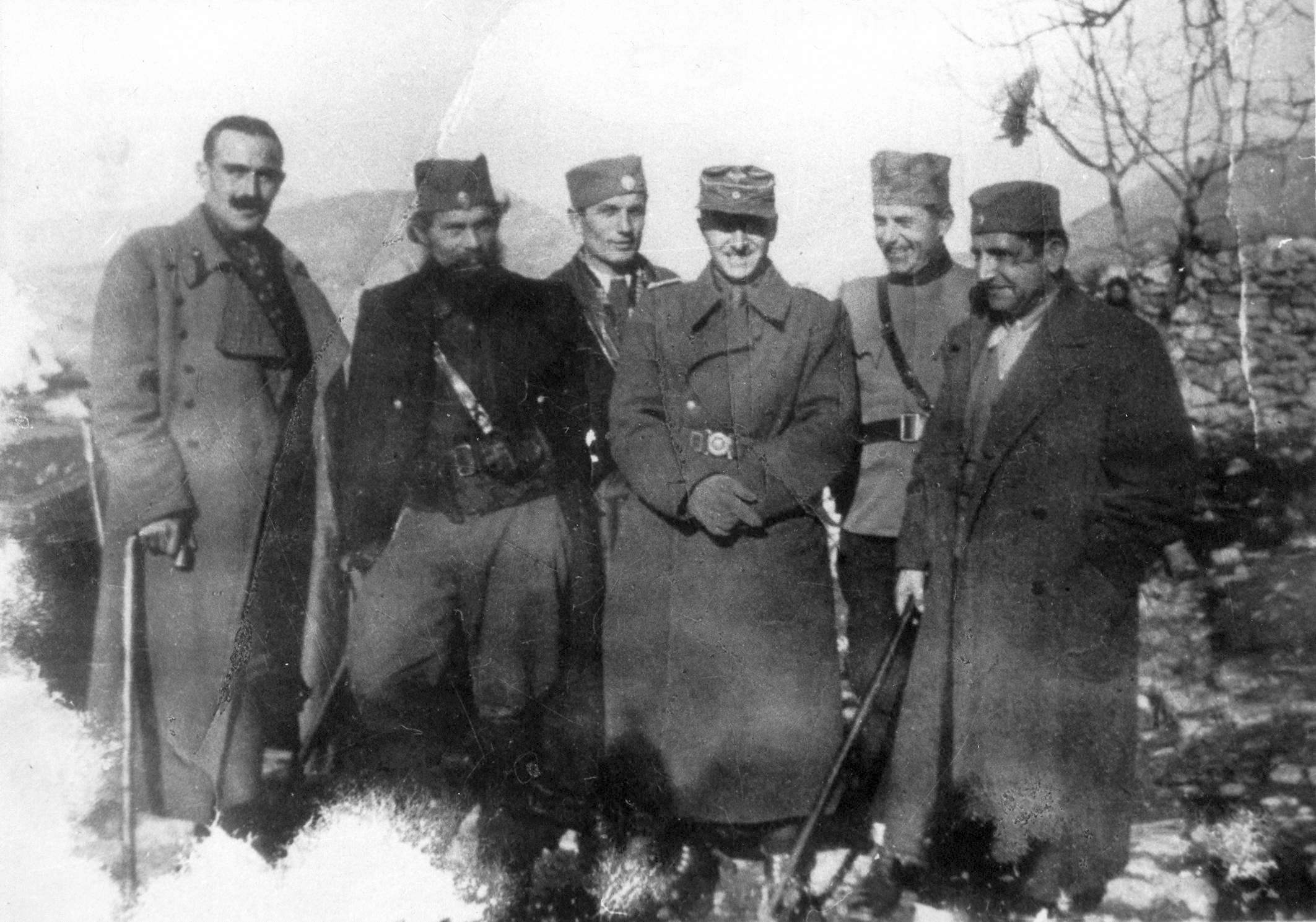
Chetnik commander Đorđije Lašić (first from right) with German officer and Chetniks in Podgorica 1944

When appraising the situation in the western part of the Territory of the Military Commander in Serbia, Bosnia, Lika, and Dalmatia, Captain Merrem, intelligence officer with the German commander-in-chief southeastern Europe, was "full of praise" for Chetnik units collaborating with the Germans, and for the smooth relations between the Germans and Chetnik units on the ground. In addition, the Chief of Staff of the 2nd Panzer Army observed in a letter to the Ustaše liaison officer that the Chetniks fighting the Partisans in Eastern Bosnia were "making a worthwhile contribution to the Croatian state", and that the 2nd Army "refused in principle" to accept Croatian complaints against the usage of these units. German-Chetnik collaboration continued to take place until the very end of the war, with the tacit approval of Draža Mihailović and the Chetnik Supreme Command in the Territory of the Military Commander in Serbia. Though Mihailović himself never actually signed any agreements, he endorsed the policy for the purpose of eliminating the Partisan threat.

Field Marshal Maximilian von Weichs commented:

Though he himself [Draža Mihailović] shrewdly refrained from giving his personal view in public, no doubt to have a free hand for every eventuality (e.g. Allied landing on the Balkans), he allowed his commanders to negotiate with Germans and to co-operate with them. And they did so, more and more ...

— Field Marshal Maximilian von Weichs, 1945

The loss of Allied support in 1943 caused the Chetniks to lean more than ever towards the Germans for assistance against the Partisans. On 14 August 1944, the Tito-Šubašić agreement between the Partisans and the Yugoslav King and government-in-exile was signed on the island of Vis. The document called on all Croats, Slovenes, and Serbs to join the Partisans. Mihailović and the Chetniks refused to follow the order and abide by the agreement and continued to engage the Partisans (by now the official Yugoslav Allied force). Consequently, on 29 August 1944, King Peter II dismissed Mihailović as Chief-of-Staff of the Yugoslav Army and on 12 September appointed Marshal Tito in his place. Tito at this point became the Prime Minister of the Yugoslav state and the joint government.

==== Collaboration with the Government of National Salvation ====
In the Territory of the Military Commander in Serbia, the Germans initially installed Milan Aćimović, as leader, but later replaced him with General Milan Nedić, former minister of war, who governed until 1944. Aćimović instead later served as the key liaison between the Germans and the Chetniks. In the second half of August 1941, prior to Nedić assuming power, the Germans arranged with Kosta Pećanac for the transfer of several thousand of his Chetniks to serve as auxiliaries for the gendarmerie. Collaboration between the Government of National Salvation and Mihailović's Chetniks began in fall of 1941 and lasted until the end of German occupation.

Nedić was initially firmly opposed to Mihailović and the Chetniks. On 4 September 1941, Mihailović sent Major Aleksandar Mišić and Miodrag Pavlović to enter a meeting with Nedić and nothing was accomplished. After Mihailović shifted his policy of mild cooperation with the Partisans to becoming hostile to them and ceasing anti-German activity in late October 1941, Nedić relaxed his opposition. On 15 October, Colonel Milorad Popović, acting on behalf of Nedić, gave Mihailović about 500,000 dinars (in addition to an equal amount given on 4 October) to persuade the Chetniks to collaborate. On 26 October 1941, Popović gave an additional 2,500,000 dinars.

By mid-November 1941, Mihailović put 2,000 of his men under Nedić's direct command and shortly later these men joined the Germans in an anti-Partisan operation. When the Germans launched Operation Mihailović on 6–7 December 1941, with the intent of capturing Mihailović and removing his headquarters in Ravna Gora, he escaped, probably because he was warned of the attack by Aćimović on 5 December.

In June 1942, Mihailović left the Territory of the Military Commander in Serbia for Montenegro and was out of contact with the Nedić authorities until he returned. In September 1942, Mihailović orchestrated civil disobedience against the Nedić government via the use of leaflets and clandestine radio transmitter messages. This civil obedience may have been orchestrated in order to use as a cover to conduct sabotage operations on railway lines used to supply Axis forces in North Africa, however it has been disputed. In the fall of 1942 the Chetniks of Mihailović (and Pećanac) who had been legalized by the Nedić administration were dissolved. By 1943, Nedić feared that the Chetniks would become the primary collaborator with the Germans and after the Chetniks murdered Ceka Đorđević, deputy minister of internal affairs, in March 1944 he opted to replace him with a prominent Chetnik in the hopes of quelling the rivalry. A report prepared in April 1944 by the U.S. Office of Strategic Services commented that:

[Mihailović] should be viewed in the same light as Nedić, Ljotić, and the Bulgarian occupation forces.

— Office of Strategic Services report, April 1944

In mid-August 1944, Mihailović, Nedić, and Dragomir Jovanović met in the village of Ražani secretly where Nedić agreed to give one hundred million dinars for wages and to request from the Germans arms and ammunition for Mihailović. On 6 September 1944, under the authority of the Germans and formalization by Nedić, Mihailović took command over the entire military force of the Nedić administration, including the Serbian State Guard, Serbian Volunteer Corps, and the Serbian Border Guard.

==== Contacts with Hungary ====
In mid-1943, the Hungarian General Staff arranged a meeting between a Serbian officer in the Nedić regime and Mihailović. The officer was instructed to express to Mihailović Hungary's regret for the massacre at Novi Sad and to promise that those responsible would be punished. Hungary recognised Mihailović as the representative of the Yugoslav government-in-exile and asked him, in the event of an Allied landing in the Balkans, not to enter Hungary with his troops, but to leave the border question to the peace conference. After contact was established, food, medicine, munitions and horses were sent to Mihailović. During his visit to Rome in April 1943, Prime Minister Miklós Kállay talked about Italo-Hungarian cooperation with the Chetniks, but Mussolini said he favoured Tito.

Hungary also tried to contact Mihailović through the royal Yugoslav government's representative in Istanbul in order to cooperate against the Partisans. The Yugoslav Minister of Foreign Affairs, Momčilo Ninčić, reportedly sent a message to Istanbul asking the Hungarians to send an envoy and a Serb politician from the Hungarian-occupied territories to negotiate. Nothing came of these contacts, but Mihailović sent a representative, Čedomir Bošnjaković, to Budapest. For their part the Hungarians sent arms, medicine and released Serbian POWs willing to serve with the Chetniks down the Danube.

After the German occupation of Hungary in March 1944, the Chetnik relationship was one of the few foreign contacts independent of German influence that Hungary had. A Hungarian diplomat, L. Hory, formerly posted in Belgrade, twice visited Mihailović in Bosnia, and the Hungarians continued to send him munitions, even across Croatian territory. The last contact between Mihailović and Hungary occurred on 13 October 1944, shortly before the German-sponsored coup of 15 October.

=== Terror tactics and cleansing actions ===
Chetnik ideology revolved around the notion of a Greater Serbia within the borders of Yugoslavia, to be created out of all territories in which Serbs were found, even if the numbers were small. This goal had long been the foundation of the movement for a Greater Serbia. During Axis occupation the notion of clearing or "ethnically cleansing" these territories was introduced largely in response to the massacres of Serbs by the Ustashe in the Independent State of Croatia. However, the largest Chetnik massacres took place in eastern Bosnia where they preceded any significant Ustashe operations. According to Pavlowitch, terror tactics were committed by local commanders of the Chetnik organisation. Mihailović disapproved these acts of ethnic cleansing against civilians, however he failed to take action in stopping these acts of terror, given the lack of command he had over local commanders and the rudimentary methods of communication that existed in the Chetnik command structure.

Prior to the outbreak of World War II, use of terror tactics had a long tradition in the area as various oppressed groups sought their freedom and atrocities were committed by all parties engaged in conflict in Yugoslavia. During the early stages of the occupation, the Ustaše had also recruited a number of Muslims to aid in the persecutions of the Serbs, and even though only a relatively small number of Croats and Muslims engaged in these activities, and many opposed them, those actions initiated a cycle of violence and retribution between the Catholics, Orthodox and Muslims, as each sought to rid the others from the territories they controlled.

In particular, Ustaše ideologues were concerned with the large Serb minority in the NDH, and initiated acts of terror on a wide scale in May 1941. Two months later, in July, the Germans protested the brutality of these actions. Reprisals followed, as in the case of Nevesinje, where Serb peasants staged an uprising in response to the persecution, drove out the Ustaše militia, but then engaged in reprisals, killing hundreds of Muslims and some Croats, whom they associated with the Ustaše.

The "Instructions" ("Instrukcije") of 1941, ordering ethnic cleansing of Bosniaks, Croats, and others.

A directive dated 20 December 1941, addressed to newly appointed commanders in Montenegro, Major Đorđije Lašić and Captain Pavle Đurišić, outlined, among other things, the cleansing of non-Serb populations in order to create a Greater Serbia:

1. The struggle for the liberty of our whole nation under the scepter of His Majesty King Peter II;
2. the creation of a Great Yugoslavia and within it of a Great Serbia which is to be ethnically pure and is to include Serbia, Montenegro, Bosnia and Herzegovina, Srijem, the Banat, and Bačka;
3. the struggle for the inclusion into Yugoslavia of all still unliberated Slovene territories under the Italians and Germans (Trieste, Gorizia, Istria, and Carinthia) as well as Bulgaria, and northern Albania with Skadar;
4. the cleansing of the state territory of all national minorities and a-national elements;
5. the creation of contiguous frontiers between Serbia and Montenegro, as well as between Serbia and Slovenia by cleansing the Muslim population from Sandžak and the Muslim and Croat populations from Bosnia and Herzegovina.

— Directive of 20 December 1941

The authenticity of the directive is disputed. Some have attributed the directive as having come from Mihailović. Others have claimed that there is no original and that it may have been a forgery made by Đurišić to suit his purposes. Mihailović's headquarters sent further instructions to the commander of the Second Sarajevo Chetnik Brigade clarifying the goal: "It should be made clear to everyone that, after the war or when the time becomes appropriate, we will complete our task and that no one except the Serbs will be left in Serbian lands. Explain this to [our] people and ensure that they make this their priority. You cannot put this in writing or announce it publicly, because the Turks [Muslims] would hear about it too, and this must not be spread around by word of mouth."

The Chetniks systemically massacred Muslims in villages that they captured. In late autumn of 1941 the Italians handed over the towns of Višegrad, Goražde, Foča and the surrounding areas, in south-east Bosnia to the Chetniks to run as a puppet administration and NDH forces were compelled by the Italians to withdraw from there. After the Chetniks gained control of Goražde on 29 November 1941, they began a massacre of Home Guard prisoners and NDH officials that became a systematic massacre of the local Muslim civilian population, with several hundred murdered and their bodies left hanging in the town or thrown into the Drina river. On 5 December 1941, the Chetniks received the town of Foča from the Italians and proceeded to massacre around five hundred Muslims. In August 1942, detachments under command of Zaharije Ostojić killed at least 2,000 Muslims in Čajniče and Foča area. Since the spring of 1942 in certain military actions of Chetniks and Italians in Lika, northern Dalmatia, Gorski kotar and Kordun, killings are becoming more frequent while villages were looted and burned. The most victims were NOP activists and their families, while population of that area was intimidated, especially Serbs. Momčilo Đujić in 1942 proclamation for the population of Lika and western Bosnia ordered all Chetnik units to "occupy all villages and towns and take all power into their hands", threatening to "destroy all settlements to the ground" if they resist regardless of whether these settlements are Croatian or Serbian. Additional massacres against the Muslims in the area of Foča took place in August 1942. In total, over two thousand people were killed in Foča.

In early January, the Chetniks entered Srebrenica and killed around a thousand Muslim civilians in the town and in nearby villages. Around the same time the Chetniks made their way to Višegrad where deaths were reportedly in the thousands. Massacres continued in the following months in the region. In the village of Žepa alone about three hundred were killed in late 1941. In early January, Chetniks massacred fifty-four Muslims in Čelebić and burned down the village. On 3 March, a contingent of Chetniks burned forty-two Muslim villagers to death in Drakan.

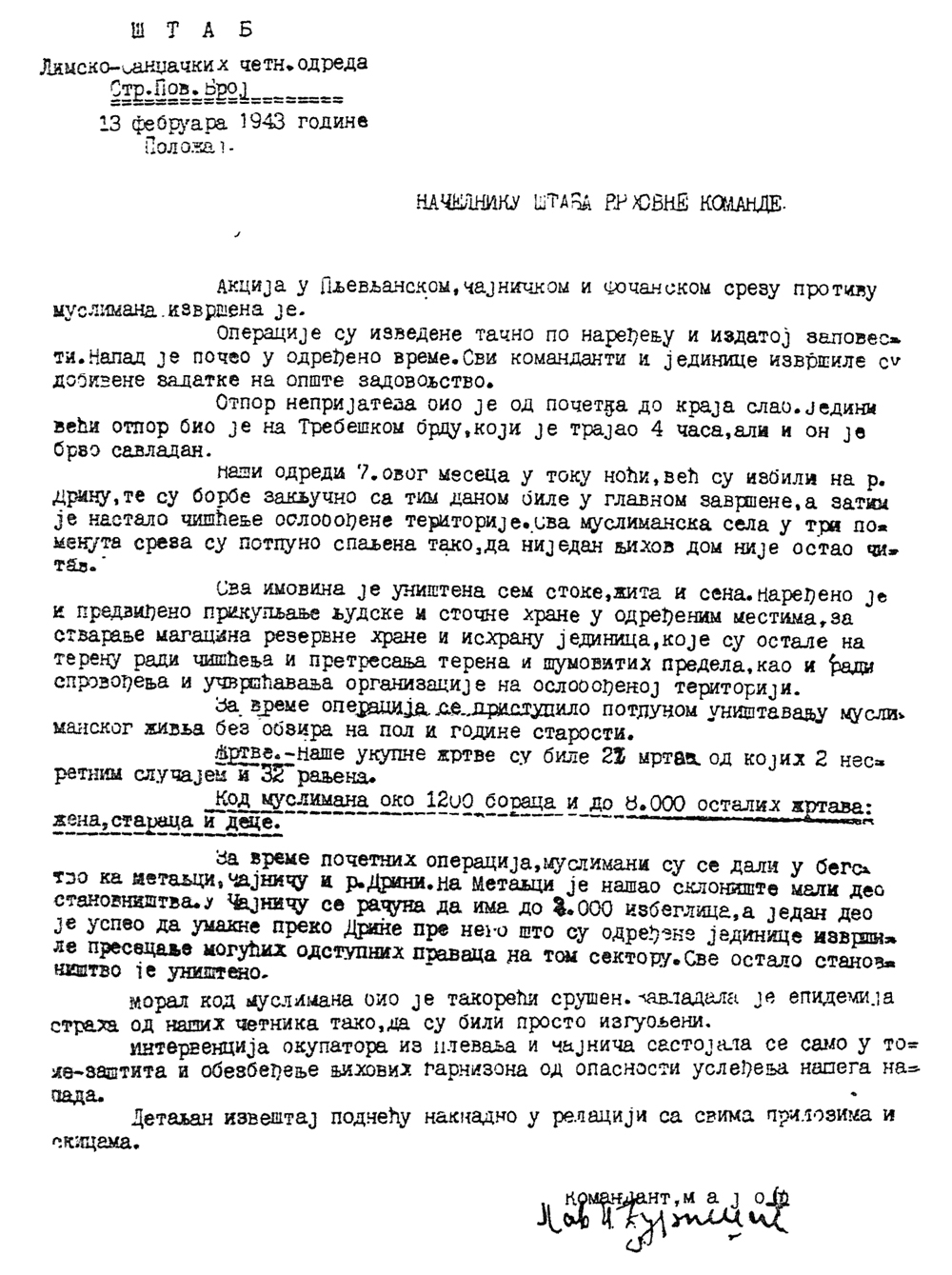
Đurišić's report of 13 February 1943 detailing the massacres of Muslims in the counties of Čajniče and Foča in southeastern Bosnia and in the county of Pljevlja in Sandžak

In early January 1943 and again in early February, Montenegrin Chetnik units were ordered to carry out "cleansing actions" against Muslims, first in the Bijelo Polje county in Sandžak and then in February in the Čajniče county and part of Foča county in southeastern Bosnia, and in part of the Pljevlja county in Sandžak. On 10 January 1943, Pavle Đurišić, the Chetnik officer in charge of these operations, submitted a report to Mihailović, Chief of Staff of the Supreme Command. His report included the results of these "cleansing operations", which according to Tomasevich, were that "thirty-three Muslim villages had been burned down, and 400 Muslim fighters (members of the Muslim self-protection militia supported by the Italians) and about 1,000 women and children had been killed, as against 14 Chetnik dead and 26 wounded".

In another report sent by Đurišić dated 13 February 1943, he reported that: "Chetniks killed about 1,200 Muslim fighters and about 8,000 old people, women, and children; Chetnik losses in the action were 22 killed and 32 wounded". He added that "during the operation the total destruction of the Muslim inhabitants was carried out regardless of sex and age". The total number of deaths in anti-Muslim operations between January and February 1943 is estimated at 10,000. The casualty rate would have been higher had not a great number of Muslims already fled, most to Sarajevo, when the February action began.

According to a statement from the Chetnik Supreme Command from 24 February 1943, these were countermeasures taken against Muslim aggressive activities; however, all circumstances show that these massacres were committed in accordance with implementing the directive of 20 December 1941. In March 1943, Mihailović listed the Chetnik action in Sandžak as one of his successes noting they had "liquidated all Muslims in the villages except those in the small towns".

Actions against Croats were smaller in scale but similar in action. In the summer of 1941, Trubar, Bosansko Grahovo and Krnjeuša were the sites of the first massacres and other attacks against ethnic Croats in the southwestern Bosnian Krajina. Throughout August and September 1942, Chetniks, under the command of Petar Baćović, intensified their actions against local Croats across the hinterland areas of southern Dalmatia. On 29 August, Chetniks killed between 141 and 160 Croats from several villages in the Zabiokovlje, Biokovo and Cetina areas while participating in the Italian anti-Partisan "Operation Albia". From the end of August, into early September 1942, Chetniks destroyed 17 Croatian villages and killed 900 Croats around the town of Makarska.

In early October 1942 in the village of Gata near Split, an estimated one hundred people were killed and many homes burnt purportedly as reprisal for the destruction of some roads in the area and carried out on the Italians' account. In that same October, formations under the command of Petar Baćović and Dobroslav Jevđević, who were participating in the Italian Operation Alfa in the area of Prozor, massacred a minimum of five hundred Croats and Muslims and burnt numerous villages. Baćović noted that "Our Chetniks killed all men 15 years of age or older. ... Seventeen villages were burned to the ground." Mario Roatta, commander of the Italian Second Army, objected to these "massive slaughters" of noncombatant civilians and threatened to halt Italian aid to the Chetniks if they did not end.

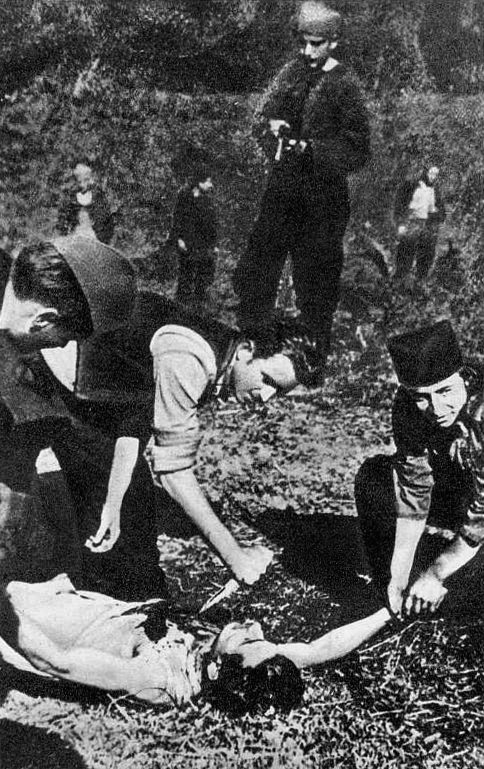
Chetniks in Šumadija kill a Partisan through heart extraction.

Croatian historian Vladimir Žerjavić initially estimated the number of Muslims and Croats killed by the Chetniks as 65,000 (33,000 Muslims and 32,000 Croats; both combatants and civilians). In 1997, he revised this figure down to 47,000 dead (29,000 Muslims and 18,000 Croats). According to Vladimir Geiger of the Croatian Institute of History, Zdravko Dizdar, a historian, estimates Chetniks killed a total of 50,000 Croats and Muslims – mostly civilians – between 1941 and 1945. According to Ramet, the Chetniks completely destroyed 300 villages and small towns and a large number of mosques and Catholic churches. Some historians contend that during this period genocide was committed against Muslims and Croats.

The Partisans were also targets of terror tactics. In the Territory of the Military Commander in Serbia, apart from a few terrorist acts against Nedić's and Ljotić's men, and in Montenegro against separatists, terror was directed solely against the Partisans, their families and sympathizers, on ideological grounds. The goal was the complete destruction of the Partisans. The Chetniks created lists of individuals that were to be liquidated and special units known as "black trojkas" were trained to carry out these acts of terror. During the summer of 1942, using names supplied by Mihailović, lists of individual Nedić and Ljotić supporters to be assassinated or threatened were broadcast over BBC radio during news programming in Serbo-Croatian. Once the British discovered this, the broadcasts were halted, although this did not prevent the Chetniks from continuing to carry out assassinations.

=== Loss of Allied support ===
To gather intelligence, official intelligence missions of the western Allies were sent into both the Partisans and the Chetniks. The intelligence gathered by liaisons were crucial to the success of supply missions and was the primary influence on Allied strategy in Yugoslavia. The search for intelligence ultimately resulted in the demise of the Chetniks and their eclipse by the Partisans. The head of British mission Colonel Bailey was instrumental for wrecking the position of Mihailović with British side.

The Germans were executing Operation Schwarz, one of a series of offensives aimed at the resistance fighters, when F.W.D. Deakin was sent by the British to gather information. His reports contained two important observations. The first was that the Partisans were courageous and aggressive in battling the German 1st Mountain and 104th Light Division, had suffered significant casualties, and required support. The second observation was that the entire German 1st Mountain Division had transited from Russia on rail lines through Chetnik-controlled territory. British intercepts of German message traffic confirmed Chetnik timidity.

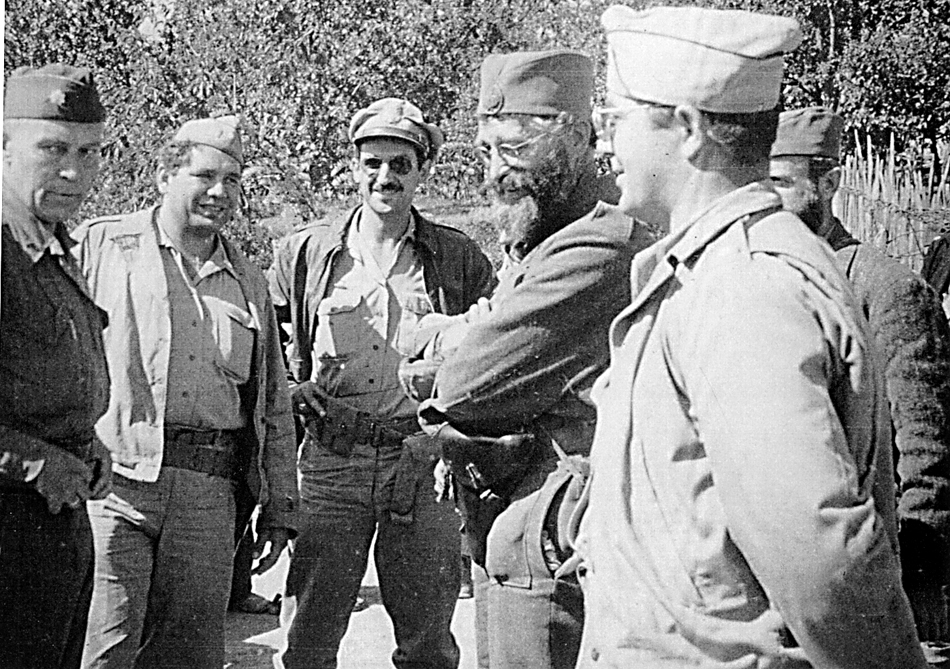
Draža Mihailović with McDowell and other US officers

All in all, intelligence reports resulted in increased Allied interest in Yugoslavia air operations, and a shift in policy. In September 1943, British policy dictated equal aid to the Chetniks and Partisans, but by December, relations between the Chetniks and British soured after Chetniks refused to obey orders to sabotage the Germans without the guarantee of an Allied landing in the Balkans. Over time British support moved away from the Chetniks, who refused to stop collaborating with the Italians and Germans instead of fighting them, towards the Partisans, who were eager to increase their anti-Axis activity.

After the Tehran Conference, the Partisans received official recognition as the legitimate national liberation force by the Allies, who subsequently set up the Balkan Air Force (under the influence and suggestion of Brigadier Fitzroy Maclean) with the aim to provide increased supplies and tactical air support for the Partisans. In February 1944, Mihailovic's Chetniks failed to fulfill British demands to demolish key bridges over the Morava and Ibar rivers, causing the British to withdraw their liaisons and halt supplying the Chetniks. Although British support for the Chetniks ceased, the Americans were less than enthusiastic about British abandonment of the anti-communist Chetniks. As support shifted towards the Partisans, Mihailović's Chetniks attempted to recommence Allied support for the Chetniks by displaying their eagerness to help the Allies. This eagerness to help was put into practice when the Office of Strategic Services (OSS) approached Mihailovic's Chetniks in mid 1944 to organise the airlift of downed US airmen. This operation known as the Halyard Mission resulted in the rescue of 417 US airmen that were previously kept safe by Mihailovic's Chetniks. Mihailović later received the Legion of Merit from US President Harry S. Truman for the rescue of Allied pilots.

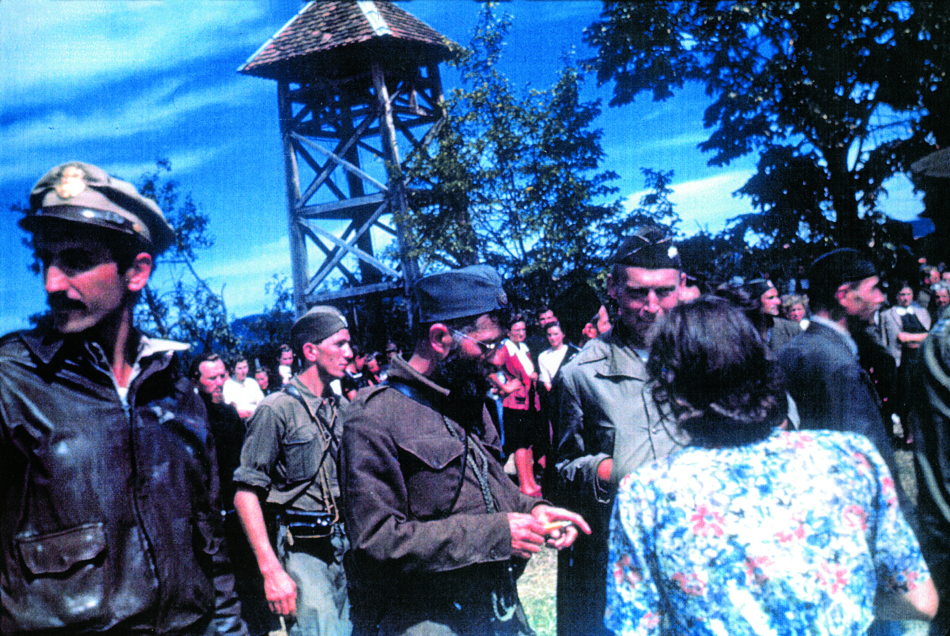
Joint US/Chetnik military ceremony in Pranjani 6 September 1944: Capt. Nick Lalich (OSS), Gen. Dragoljub Mihailović (Yugoslav Army in the Homeland), and Col. Robert McDowell (OSS)

On 14 August 1944, the Tito-Šubašić agreement between Partisans and the Government in exile was signed on the island of Vis. The document called on all Croats, Slovenes, and Serbs to join the Partisans. Mihailović and the Chetniks refused to accept the Royal Government's agreement and continued to engage the Partisans, by now the official Yugoslav Allied force. Consequently, on 29 August 1944, King Peter II dismissed Mihailović as Chief-of-Staff of the Yugoslav Army and on 12 September appointed Marshal Josip Broz Tito in his place. On 6 October 1944, the Nedić government transferred the Serbian State Guard to Mihailović's command, although cooperation proved impossible and they separated in January 1945 while in Bosnia. During cooperation between Chetniks and SDS, they alongside Muslim Militia helped Germans to take better positions in Sandžak, as they helped them take important towns from the Partisans in October 1944, allowing Army Group E to make retreat to Bosnia.

=== Cooperation with the Soviets ===
In September 1944, the Soviets invaded and occupied Romania and Bulgaria, removing them from the war and putting Soviet forces on the borders of Yugoslavia. The Chetniks were not unprepared for this, and throughout the war their propaganda strove to harness the pro-Russian and pan-Slavic sympathies of the majority of the Serb population. The distinction between the Russian people and their communist government was belaboured, as was the supposed difference between Yugoslav Partisans, who were allegedly Trotskyists, and the Soviets, who were Stalinists.

On 10 September 1944, a Chetnik mission of approximately 150 men, led by Lieutenant Colonel Velimir Piletić, commander of northeastern Serbia, crossed the Danube into Romania and established contact with Soviet forces at Craiova. Their main purpose, according to the memoirs of one of them, Lt. Col. Miodrag Ratković, was to establish Soviet agreement to certain political goals: a cessation of the civil war through Soviet mediation, free elections supervised by the Allied powers and the postponement of any war-related trials until after elections. Before the mission could go on to Bucharest, where the American and British military missions were, they were denounced by one of Piletić's aides as British spies and arrested by the Soviets on 1 October.

Although the Chetniks believed they could fight as allies of the Soviets at the same time as they fought the Partisans, they did manage some local cooperation with the former while antagonising the Germans. In a circular of 5 October, Mihailović wrote: "We consider the Russians as our allies. The struggle against Tito's forces in Serbia will be continued." The Germans were aware of the Chetniks' disposition through radio intercepts, and their intelligence reported on 19 October that "the Chetniks have never been prepared by Draža Mihailović through appropriate propaganda for a fighting encounter with the Russians. Draža Mihailović has on the contrary upheld the fiction that the Russians as allies of the Americans and the British will never act against the interests of the Serbian nationalists."

The commander of a group of the Shock Corps, Lt. Col. Keserović, was the first Chetnik officer to cooperate with the Soviets. In mid-October his troops met Soviet forces advancing into central eastern Serbia from Bulgaria and together they captured the town of Kruševac, the Soviets leaving Keserović in charge of the town. Within three days, Keserović was warning his fellow commanders that the Russians were only talking with the Partisans and disarming the Chetniks. Keserović reported to Supreme Command on 19 October that his delegate to the Soviet division had returned with a message ordering his men to be disarmed and incorporated in the Partisan armed forces by 18 October.

Another Chetnik commander to cooperate with the Soviets was Captain Predrag Raković of the Second Ravna Gora Corps, whose men participated in the capture of Čačak, where they captured 339 soldiers of the Russisches Schutzkorps Serbien (whom they turned over to the Soviets). Raković apparently had a written agreement with the local Soviet commander, placing himself and his men under Soviet command in return for recognition that they were Mihailović's men. After a protest from Tito to Marshal Fyodor Tolbukhin, commander of the front, Keserović's and Raković's cooperation came to an end. By 11 November the latter had gone into hiding and his forces had fled west to avoid being disarmed and placed under Partisan control.

=== Retreat and dissolution ===
Finally, in April and May 1945, as the victorious Partisans took possession of the country's territory, many Chetniks retreated toward Italy and a smaller group toward Austria. Many were captured by the Partisans or returned to Yugoslavia by British forces while a number were killed in the Bleiburg repatriations. Some were tried for treason and were sentenced to prison terms or death. Many were summarily executed, especially in the first months after the end of the war. Mihailović and his few remaining followers tried to fight their way back to the Ravna Gora, but he was captured by Partisan forces. In March 1946, Mihailović was brought to Belgrade, where he was tried and executed on charges of treason in July. During the closing years of World War II, many Chetniks defected from their units, as the Partisan commander-in-chief, Marshal Josip Broz Tito, proclaimed a general amnesty to all defecting forces for a time.

== Chetnik insurgency in Yugoslavia (1944–1950) ==
After the World War II largely ended in Serbia (1944) and later in Yugoslavia, Chetnik groups continued to operate predominantly in Croatia, Bosnia and Serbia until 1950. These smaller Chetnik groups saw combat against the newly established Communist regime resulting in hundreds of deaths of government forces and civilians.

Chetnik insurgency
- Part of World War II in Yugoslavia, Cold War and Anti-communist insurgencies in Central and Eastern Europe
Date	1944–1950
Location	Yugoslavia
Result	Reduction of Chetnik activity and destruction of many groups; Many Chetnik attacks leading to high casualties
Territorial changes	Temporary Chetnik occupation of several villages in Croatia

Belligerents
Chetniks (Serbia) Serbian Volunteer Corps (1944 - ~1945) (Nazi Germany) Nazi Holdouts (1944 - 1945)	Yugoslavia

Commanders and leaders
(Chetniks) Draža Mihailović (executed) (Chetniks) Nikola Kalabić (executed) (Serbia) Radoslav Pavlović (Serbia) Slobodan Nedeljković (Chetniks) Cvijetin Todić † and various other Chetnik commanders	(Socialist Federal Republic of Yugoslavia) Josip Broz Tito (Socialist Federal Republic of Yugoslavia) Mijo Kerošević † (Socialist Federal Republic of Yugoslavia) Ivan Ribar (Socialist Federal Republic of Yugoslavia) Miloje Milojević (Socialist Federal Republic of Yugoslavia) Đuro Bošković † (Socialist Federal Republic of Yugoslavia) Stjepan Funarić (WIA)

Strength
(Chetniks) 4,149 (October 1945) (Serbia) 29 (1945) (Nazi Germany) Tens (1945)	(Socialist Federal Republic of Yugoslavia) Tens of thousands

Casualties and losses
(Chetniks) Many killed, arrested and deserted (Serbia) Several captured (1945) (Nazi Germany) 17 killed (1945)	1945–1946 (Socialist Federal Republic of Yugoslavia) 778 killed (both military and civilian deaths); 1946–1950 (Socialist Federal Republic of Yugoslavia) Many killed and wounded

=== Insurgency ===
Deployment of Chetnik groups from Bosnia started in February 1945. One of these groups were led by Aleksandar Mihailović and it numbered 32 commandos. 11 Chetniks that belonged to the Božo Ivanović group were captured on 25 February near Lazarevac. A second group, consisting of 110 commandos and 26 Chetniks led by Milan Lazarević, managed to deploy in Pijeć ada with German support during the night of 5 and 6 March. Soon after, 91 Chetniks surrendered and 3 were killed. Lazarević was wounded and died soon after from his wounds. During the fighting between the 3rd and 12th Serbian Brigades and the Chetniks on the night of 9-10 March, 38 Chetniks and 17 Germans were killed while the brigades suffered 3 casualties. In the spring of 1945, several groups of Serbian Volunteer Corps parachuted into Serbia from German aircraft. Most members of the group that parachuted in during the night of between 5–6 March, led Radoslav Pavlović, were captured. A group led by Slobodan Nedeljković parachuted on 23–24 March north of Podujevo. By the end of March, one part of the second group were captured, while the rest managed to join the Chetniks led by Drago Gočanin and later those led by Mirko Tomašević.

Radoslav Pavlović was chosen as commander of all units in southeastern Serbia. Chetnik attacks on villages were recorded in June 1945, as were attacks on Dobroselo. In August, there were 3,260 Chetniks in Bosnia, but that number decreased to 2,754 by September because the amnesty was more effective in Bosnia than in Serbia. The number of Chetniks in Serbia was around 1,400, and it decreased by the end of 1945. According to Yugoslav reports, approximately 4,149 Chetniks were active in the Democratic Federal Yugoslavia in October 1945. During the Chetnik actions in October they killed 2 officers, 34 soldiers, 18 militiamen, 8 recruits and 47 civilians. The 21st Serbian division captured 46 Chetniks while 5 were killed from 1 to 15 October. Several families were forced out from their homes under the suspicion of supporting Chetniks. Murder of Chetnik family members also occurred. The Chetnik group attacked government forces in Sjenica on 28 October, killing one member of OZNA and injuring two members of the militia and six members of the 6th Division. On the same day in the village of Cikote, near Kosjerić, ten Chetniks that were led by Miroljub Marković fought against the Yugoslav militia and killed one militiamen. Pavle Ivanović and his group clashed with the People's Defence Corps of Yugoslavia (KNOJ) in Gubervica, having 2 wounded and successfully managing to escape, while the KNOJ had 1 killed and 2 injured. In November, in the territory under the command of the 1st Army, 52 Chetniks were killed and 62 were captured. On the night of 10-11 November, Slobodan Bajić was killed along with four Chetniks who belonged to his group, leading to the destruction of his unit. In the second half of November, several Chetnik commanders were killed, including Mirko Tomašević and Filip Ajdačić. A small Chetnik group led by Novica Cogoljević was encircled in Dragačev and destroyed. Throughout the winter of 1945–1946, government forces would destroy several small Chetnik groups. Yugoslav authority undertook radical actions to destroy remaining Chetnik groups, especially in the Lika area. One of the radical methods was forced displacement of Serbs from the area of Gospić, Plaški, Donji Lapac and Gračac. The main part of the Chetniks was located in the area of Lapac while in the winter of 1946, actions were organized against them which testifies about the seriousness of the Chetnik threat. By end of November 1945, 3,493 Chetniks were active and 1,443 by the end of July. From 1945 to 31 July 1946, Chetniks killed 43 officers, 383 soldiers and 352 civilians. In 1946 in Velebit, Chetniks led by Sima Marčević, in collaboration with the Crusaders, ambushed a Yugoslav Army truck, killing 12 soldiers. This Chetnik group killed several communist activists, and in May 1948 killed one UDBA member. Chetnik activity continued until the 1950s.

== Aftermath ==
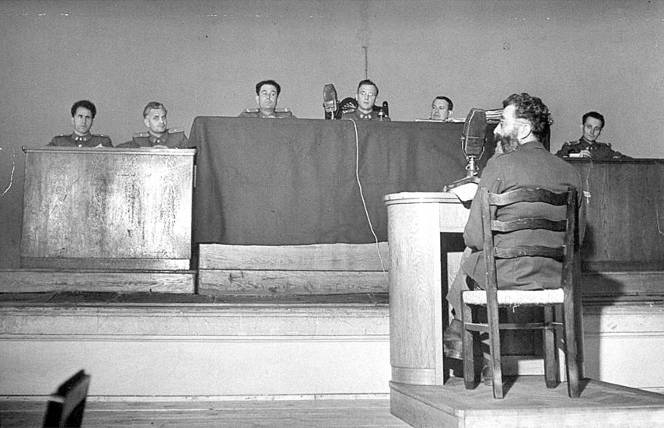
Draža Mihailović under trial, 1946.

After the end of World War II, the Chetniks were banned in the new Socialist Federal Republic of Yugoslavia. On 29 November 1945, King Peter II was deposed by the Yugoslav Constituent Assembly after an overwhelming referendum result. Chetnik leaders either escaped the country or were arrested by the authorities. On 13 March 1946, Mihailović was captured by OZNA, the Yugoslav security agency. He was put on trial, found guilty of high treason against Yugoslavia, sentenced to death and then executed by firing squad on 17 July. Several other prominent Chetnik figures were tried during the trial, Rade Radić and Miloš Glišić were sentenced to death and executed alongside Mihailović, Mladen Žujović was sentenced to death in absentia and four other were sentenced to prison time.

In August 1945 Chetnik commanders Dragutin Keserović and Vojislav Lukačević were sentenced to death and executed on August 17.

In 1947, Đujić was tried and sentenced in absentia for war crimes by Yugoslavia. He was declared a war criminal who as commander of the Dinara Division was responsible for organizing and carrying out a series of mass murders, massacres, tortures, rapes, robberies, and imprisonments, and collaborating with the German and Italian occupiers. He was accused of being responsible for the deaths of 1,500 people during the war.

Following his arrival in the United States, Đujić and his fighters played a role in the foundation of the Ravna Gora Movement of Serbian Chetniks. Other Chetniks factions found their way to the midwestern United States and to Australia.

According to Denis Bećirović after the war state structures of Yugoslavia, including Bosnia and Herzegovina, considered most Serbian Orthodox priests as potential or real enemies of the state. The negative attitude of the Communist Party of Yugoslavia towards the Serbian Orthodox Church was also influenced by the fact that some priests during the war supported Chetnik movement. In documents of the Commission for Religious Affairs states that "most priests during the war supported and cooperated with Draža Mihailović's movement; that they protected and maintained contact with war criminals; and that they appointed persons in the administration of church institutions who were convicted of collaborating with the occupier".

In January 1951, the Yugoslav government charged 16 individuals that were Chetnik in orientation with being part of a conspiracy that plotted to overthrow the government and reinstate King Petar with French and American military intelligence assistance. Of the charged, 15 were sentenced to long prison sentences and one was sentenced to death. On 12 January 1952, the government reported four or five Chetnik "brigades" numbering around 400 men each still existed and were at the borders of Hungary, Romania, Bulgaria, and Albania, and in Montenegrin forests, attacking meetings of the communist party and police buildings. As late as November 1952, small Chetnik groups operated in mountains and forests around Kalinovik and Trnovo. Trials of wartime Chetniks carried on until 1957.

In 1957, Blagoje Jovović along with other former Chetniks living in Argentina received a tip off from an ex-Italian general as to the whereabouts of Ante Pavelić, former Poglavnik of the NDH who was hiding in Argentina. At the time Pavelić had escaped to Argentina with the help from members of the Catholic clergy via the escape route known as the ratlines. Jovović and other Chetniks put into action an assassination plan and on 10 April 1957, Jovović was able to track down Pavelić. Pavelić survived the assassination attempt after receiving two gunshot wounds, only to succumb to injuries and die two years later on 28 December 1959.

In 1975, Nikola Kavaja, a diaspora Chetnik-sympathizer living in Chicago and belonging to the Serbian National Defense Council (SNDC), was, at his own initiative, responsible for bombing a Yugoslav consul's home, the first in a series of attacks targeting the Yugoslav state in the United States and Canada. He and his co-conspirators were captured in a sting set up by the Federal Bureau of Investigation and convicted for terrorism for the incident and for planning to bomb two Yugoslav receptions on Yugoslavia's Republic Day. Later that year, during his flight to receive his sentence, he hijacked the American Airlines Flight 293 with the intention of crashing the plane into Tito's Belgrade headquarters, but was dissuaded; he ultimately received a 67-year prison sentence.

== Legacy ==
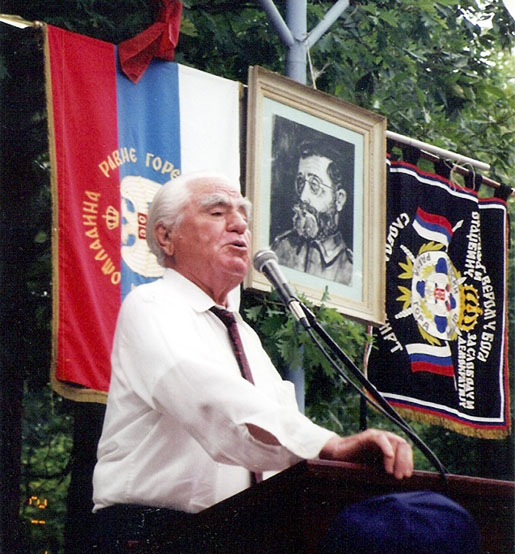
Momčilo Đujić delivering a speech in Canada, July 1991.

=== Yugoslav Wars ===
After Slobodan Milošević's assumption of power in 1989 various Chetnik groups made a "comeback" and his regime "made a decisive contribution to launching the Chetnik insurrection in 1990–1992 and to funding it thereafter". Chetnik ideology was influenced by the memorandum of the Serbian Academy of Sciences and Arts. On 28 June 1989, the 600th anniversary of the Battle of Kosovo, Serbs in north Dalmatia, Knin, Obrovac, and Benkovac where there were "old Chetnik strongholds", held the first anti-Croatian government demonstrations.

On the same day, Momčilo Đujić declared Vojislav Šešelj "at once assumes the role of a Chetnik vojvoda" and ordered him "to expel all Croats, Albanians, and other foreign elements from holy Serbian soil", stating he would return only when Serbia was cleansed of "the last Jew, Albanian, and Croat". The Serbian Orthodox Church began the procession of the reliquary of Prince Lazar, who participated in the Battle of Kosovo and was canonized, and in the summer it reached the Zvornik-Tuzla eparchy in Bosnia and Herzegovina where there was a feeling of "historic tragedy of the Serb people, which is experiencing a new Kosovo" accompanied by nationalist declarations and Chetnik iconography.

Later that year, Vojislav Šešelj, Vuk Drašković, and Mirko Jović formed the Serbian National Renewal (SNO), a Chetnik party. In March 1990, Drašković and Šešelj splintered to form a separate Chetnik party, the Serbian Renewal Movement (SPO). On 18 June 1990, Šešelj organized the Serbian Chetnik Movement (SČP) though it wasn't permitted official registration due to its obvious Chetnik identification. On 23 February 1991, it merged with the National Radical Party (NRS), establishing the Serbian Radical Party (SRS) with Šešelj as president and Tomislav Nikolić as vice president. It was a Chetnik party, oriented towards neo-fascism with a striving for the territorial expansion of Serbia. In July 1991, Serb-Croat clashes broke out in Croatia and rallies were held in the Ravna Gora mountains with chants in favor of war and recollected "glories" of Chetnik massacres of Croats and Muslims during World War II. The SPO held many rallies at Ravna Gora.

During the Yugoslav Wars, many Serb paramilitaries styled themselves as Chetniks. The SRS's military wing was known as "Chetniks" and received weaponry from the Yugoslav People's Army (JNA) and Serbian police. Šešelj personally helped arm Serbs in Croatia and recruited volunteers in Serbia and Montenegro, sending 5,000 men to Croatia and up to 30,000 to Bosnia and Herzegovina. According to Šešelj "the Chetniks never acted outside the umbrella of the Yugoslav People's Army and the Serbian police". Željko Ražnatović, a self-styled Chetnik, led a Chetnik force called the Serb Volunteer Guard (SDG), established on 11 October 1990. The SDG was connected to the Serbian Ministry of Interior, operated under JNA command, and reported directly to Milošević. It had between 1,000 and 1,500 men. Jović, at the time the Serbian Minister of the Interior, organized the youth wing of the SNO into the White Eagles, a paramilitary closely based on the World War II Chetnik movement, and called for "a Christian, Orthodox Serbia with no Muslims and no unbelievers." It came to be associated with the SRS though Šešelj denied the connection.

Both the White Eagles and SDG received instructions from the Yugoslav Counterintelligence Service. In September–October 1991, the Ozren Chetniks were established to "carry on the 'best' Chetnik traditions of the Second World War". A paramilitary group called the Chetnik Avengers also existed and was led by Milan Lukić who later took command of the White Eagles. A Chetnik unit led by Slavko Aleksić operated under the command of the Army of Republika Srpska. In 1991 it fought in the Krajina area of Croatia and in 1992 around Sarajevo in Bosnia and Herzegovina.

Milošević and Radovan Karadžić, the president of the self-proclaimed Republika Srpska, used the subordinate Chetnik forces of Šešelj and Ražnatović as part of their plan to expel non-Serbs and form a Greater Serbia through the use of ethnic cleansing, terror, and demoralization. Šešelj's and Ražnatović's formations acted as "autonomous" groups in the RAM Plan which sought to organize Serbs outside Serbia, consolidate control of the Serbian Democratic Parties (SDS), and prepare arms and ammunition in an effort to establish a country where "all Serbs with their territories would live together in the same state." According to historian Noel Malcolm the "steps taken by Karadžić and his party – [declaring Serb] "Autonomous Regions", the arming of the Serb population, minor local incidents, non-stop propaganda, the request for federal army "protection" – matched exactly what had been done in Croatia. Few observers could doubt that a single plan was in operation."

Chetnik units engaged in mass murders and war crimes. In 1991, the Croatian town of Erdut was forcefully taken over by the SDG and JNA and annexed to the puppet state of Republic of Serbian Krajina. Croats and other non-Serbs were either expelled or killed with Serbs repopulating empty villages in the area. On 1 April 1992, the SDG attacked Bijeljina and carried out a massacre of Muslim civilians. On 4 April, Chetnik irregulars helped the JNA in shelling Sarajevo. On 6 April, Chetniks and the JNA attacked Bijeljina, Foča, Bratunac, and Višegrad. On 9 April, the SDG and Šešelj's Chetniks aided the JNA and special units of the Serbian security force in overtaking Zvornik and ridding it of its local Muslim population.

Reports sent by Ražnatović to Milošević, Ratko Mladić, and Blagoje Adžić stated the plan was progressing, noting that the psychological attack on the Bosniak population in Bosnia and Herzegovina was effective and should continue. Chetnik forces also engaged in mass murder in Vukovar and Srebrenica. The White Eagles were responsible for massacres in Voćin, Višegrad, Foča, Sjeverin, and Štrpci, and for terrorizing the Muslim population in Sandžak. In September 1992, Chetniks attempted to force Sandžak Muslims in Pljevlja to flee by demolishing their stores and houses whilst shouting "Turks leave" and "this is Serbia". By mid-1993, they suffered over a hundred bombings, kidnappings, expulsions, and shootings. The SPO threatened Muslims with expulsion when reacting to requests for autonomy in Sandžak.

On 15 May 1993, Šešelj proclaimed eighteen Chetnik fighters as vojvodas, naming towns that were cleansed of non-Serbs in their citation, and they were blessed by an Orthodox priest afterwards. Šešelj came to be described as "a man whose killer commando units operating in Croatia and Bosnia carried on the very worst of the Chetnik tradition."

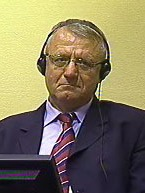
Vojislav Šešelj under trial at the ICTY.

Later the SRS became a government coalition partner of Milosević and in 1998, Đujić publicly stated that he regretted awarding that title to Šešelj. He was quoted as saying, "I was naïve when I nominated Šešelj [as] Vojvoda; I ask my people to forgive me. The greatest gravedigger of Serbdom is Slobodan Milošević" and that he is "disappointed in Šešelj for openly collaborating with Milošević's Socialist Party, with Communists who have only changed their name. ... Šešelj has sullied the reputation of Chetniks and Serbian nationalism." In 2000, Ražnatović was assassinated before facing prosecution by the International Criminal Tribunal for the former Yugoslavia (ICTY). In 2003, Šešelj surrendered himself to the ICTY to face war crimes charges and was acquitted in 2016.

Nikolić, whom Šešelj had, in 1993, proclaimed vojvoda and awarded the Order of Chetnik Knights for his subordinates' "personal courage in defending the fatherland", took over the SRS. He vowed to pursue a Greater Serbia "through peaceful means". In 2008, Lukić was sentenced to life imprisonment for crimes against humanity and war crimes.

The British journalist Misha Glenny, author of "The Fall of Yugoslavia", stated that the revival of the Serb nationalists in Yugoslavia in the 1990s was one of the most "hideous and frightening aspects of the fall of communism in Serbia and Yugoslavia" and "this breed, which finds nurture in the perpetration of unspeakable acts of brutality, encapsulates all that is irrational and unacceptable in Balkan society."

=== Serbian historiography ===
In the 1980s, Serbian historians initiated the process of reexamining the narrative of how World War II was told in Yugoslavia, which was accompanied by the rehabilitation of Chetnik leader Draža Mihailović. Being preoccupied with the era, Serbian historians have looked to vindicate Chetnik history by portraying Chetniks as righteous freedom fighters battling the Nazis while removing from history books the ambiguous alliances with the Italians and Germans. The crimes committed by Chetniks against Croats and Muslims in Serbian historiography are overall "cloaked in silence".

== Contemporary period ==
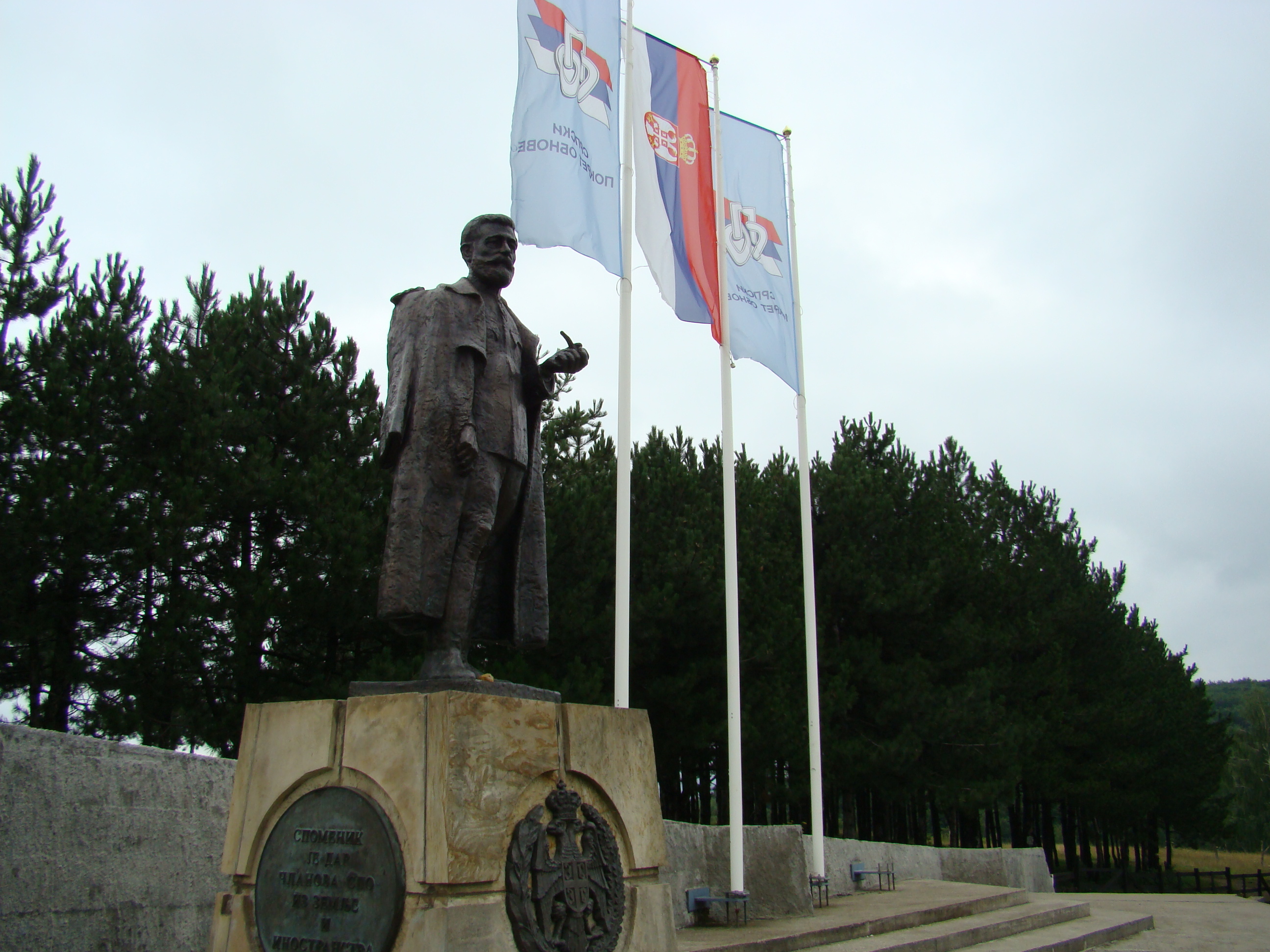
Monument to Draža Mihailović on Ravna Gora.

=== Serbia ===
In Serbia there has been a revival of the Chetnik movement. Since the early 1990s, the SPO has annually held the "Ravna Gora Parliament" and in 2005 it was organized with state funding for the first time. Croatian president Stjepan Mesić later cancelled a planned visit to Serbia as it coincided with the gathering. People who attend the Parliament wear Chetnik iconography and T-shirts with the image of Mihailović or of Mladić, who was on trial at the ICTY on charges of genocide, crimes against humanity and war crimes. The SRS headed by Nikolić, still in favor of a Greater Serbia and rooted in the Chetnik movement, won the 2003 elections with 27.7 percent and gained 82 seats of the 250 available. In 2005, Patriarch Pavle of the Serbian Orthodox Church backed the SRS. It later won the 2007 elections with 28.7 percent of the vote. In 2008, Nikolić split with SRS over the issue of cooperation with the European Union and formed the Serbian Progressive Party.

Serbian textbooks have contained historical revisionism of the Chetnik role in World War II since the 1990s. Reinterpretation and revisionism has focused primarily on three areas: Chetnik-Partisan relations, Axis collaboration, and crimes against civilians. The 2002 Serbian textbook intended for the final years of high school hailed Chetniks as national patriots, minimized the Partisan movement, and resulted in protests from historians who viewed the work as dubious. It contained no mention of Chetnik collaboration or of atrocities committed by Chetniks on non-Serbs. Chetniks that killed individuals who cooperated with communists were said to have been renegades. The Chetniks were referred to as "the core of the Serb civic resistance" and "contrary to the communists, who wanted to split up the Serb ethnic space, sought to expand Serbia by incorporating Montenegro, the whole of Bosnia-Herzegovina, part of Dalmatia including Dubrovnik and Zadar, the whole Srem, including Vukovar, Vinkovi, and Dalj, Kosovo and Metohija, and South Serbia (Macedonia)", and were portrayed as betrayed by the Western Allies. The Chetnik movement is claimed to be the sole one with "Serb national interests" and their defeat was equated with the defeat of Serbia, stating in bold that: "In the Second World War, the Serbian citizenry was destroyed, the national movement shattered, and the intelligentsia demolished." After public criticism, the 2006 textbook for the final year of elementary school mentioned collaboration, but attempted to justify it and stated all factions of the war collaborated.

In March 2004, the National Assembly of Serbia passed a new law that equalized the Chetniks and Partisans as equivalent anti-fascists. The vote was 176 for, 24 against and 4 abstained. Vojislav Mihailović, the Vice President of the Serbian Parliament and grandson of Draža Mihailović, stated it was "late, but it provides satisfaction to a good portion of Serbia, their descendants. They will not get financial resources, but will have the satisfaction that their grandfathers, fathers, were true fighters for a free Serbia." Partisan war veterans' associations criticized the law and stated that Serbia was "the first country in Europe to declare a quisling movement as being liberating and anti-fascist." In 2009, Serbian courts rehabilitated one of the chief Chetnik ideologues Dragiša Vasić. In September 2012, the Constitutional Court of Serbia declared the 2004 law unconstitutional stating Chetnik veterans were not permitted an allowance and medical assistance while still maintaining their rights to a pension and rehabilitation. According to Goran Marković, today's revisionists see the Chetnik movement as anti-fascist although in November 1941 this movement began collaborating with the occupiers and other quislings, it actually means that in 1941 Serbia had an anti-fascist movement which refused to fight against fascism and collaborated with fascism.

The Serbian basketball player Milan Gurović has a tattoo of Mihailović on his left arm which has resulted in a ban since 2004 in playing in Croatia where it is "considered an incitement ... of racial, national or religious hatred". Later Bosnia and Herzegovina and Turkey enacted such a ban. Serbian rock musician and poet Bora Đorđević, leader of the highly popular rock band Riblja Čorba, was also a self-declared Chetnik, but calling it a "national movement that is much older than the WWII", and adding that he does not hate other nations and has never been a member of the SRS nor advocated Greater Serbia.

=== Montenegro ===
In May 2002, plans were prepared for a "Montenegrin Ravna Gora" memorial complex to be located near Berane. The complex was to be dedicated to Đurišić, who not only spent some of his youth at Berane but had also established his wartime headquarters there. In June 2003, Vesna Kilibarda, the Montenegrin Minister of Culture, banned the construction of the monument saying that the Ministry of Culture had not applied for approval to erect it.

The Association of War Veterans of the National Liberation Army (SUBNOR) objected to the construction of the monument saying that Đurišić was a war criminal who was responsible for the deaths of many colleagues of the veterans association and 7,000 Muslims. The association was also concerned about the organizations that backed the construction including the Serbian Orthodox Church and its Montenegrin wing which was led by Metropolitan Amfilohije. The Muslim Association of Montenegro condemned the construction and stated that "this is an attempt to rehabilitate him and it is a great insult to the children of the innocent victims and the Muslim people in Montenegro." On 4 July, the Montenegrin government forbade the unveiling of the monument stating that it "caused public concern, encouraged division among the citizens of Montenegro, and incited national and religious hatred and intolerance." A press release from the committee in charge of the construction of the monument stated that the actions taken by the government were "absolutely illegal and inappropriate". On 7 July, the stand that was prepared for the erection of the monument was removed by the police.

In 2011, the Montenegrin Serb political party New Serb Democracy (NOVA) renewed efforts for a monument to be built and stated that Đurišić and other royal Yugoslav officers were "leaders of the 13 July uprising" and that they "continued their struggle to liberate the country under the leadership of King Peter and the Government of the Kingdom of Yugoslavia".

=== Bosnia and Herzegovina ===
On 22 July 1996, the Republika Srpska entity of Bosnia and Herzegovina created a veteran rights law that explicitly covered former Chetniks, but did not include former Partisans.

During the Bosnian War, the main traffic road in Brčko was renamed the "Boulevard of General Draža Mihailović" and on 8 September 1997 a statue of Mihailović was established in the town's center. In 2000, the street was renamed the "Boulevard of Peace" and in 2004, after lobbying by Bosniak returnees and intervention from the Office of the High Representative, the statue was moved to an Orthodox cemetery located at the outskirts of Brčko. It was removed on 20 October 2005 and on 18 August 2013 unveiled in Višegrad.

In May 1998, the Chetnik Ravna Gora Movement of Republika Srpska was founded and proclaimed itself the military branch of the SDS and the SRS. In April 1998, the "key date in its recent history" occurred when Šešelj had held a speech for a gathering in Brčko with representatives from the SDS, the SRS, the Serb National Alliance (SNS), the Assembly of Serb Sisters of Mother Jevrosima, the High Council of Chetnik Veterans of Republika Srpska, and the Chetnik Ravna Gora Movement of Serbia in attendance. In April 1999 it was legally registered and later renamed the Serb National Homeland Movement. Important individuals in its beginnings included: Radovan Karadžić, Ratko Mladić, Nikola Poplašen, Dragan Čavić, Mirko Banjac, Mirko Blagojević, Velibor Ostojić, Vojo Maksimović and Božidar Vučurević. It operated in fourteen regions where members work in "trojkas" and infiltrate various civilian organisations. On 5 May 2001, it disrupted cornerstone laying ceremonies for the destroyed Omer Pasha Mosque in Trebinje and on 7 May for the destroyed Ferhat Pasha Mosque in Banja Luka. The Bosnian magazine Dani linked to the Oslobođenje newspapers, claimed that the "international community" and the Organization for Security and Co-operation in Europe designated it a terrorist and pro-fascist organization. In 2005, United States president George W. Bush issued an executive order and its US assets were, among other organizations, frozen for obstructing the Dayton Agreement.

On 12 July 2007, a day after the 12th anniversary of the Srebrenica massacre and the burial of a further 465 victims, a group of men dressed in Chetnik uniforms marched the streets of Srebrenica. They all wore badges of military units which committed the massacre in July 1995. On 11 July 2009, after the burial of 543 victims in Srebrenica, members of the Ravna Gora Chetnik movement desecrated the flag of Bosnia and Herzegovina, marched in the streets wearing T-shirts with the face of Mladić and sang Chetnik songs. A group of men and women associated with the Serbian far-right group Obraz "chanted insults directed towards the victims and in support of the Chetnik movement, calling for eradication of Islam." A full report of the incident was submitted to the local District Prosecutor's Office but no one has been prosecuted. The Social Democratic Party of Bosnia and Herzegovina campaigned for a creation of a law that would ban the group within Bosnia.

=== Croatia ===
Milorad Pupovac of the Independent Democratic Serb Party in Croatia (the present-day leader of Serbs of Croatia and member of the Parliament of Croatia), described the organization as "fascist collaborators".

=== United States ===
Serbian-Americans set up a monument dedicated to Pavle Đurišić at the Serbian cemetery in Libertyville, Illinois. The management and players of the football club Red Star Belgrade visited it on 23 May 2010.

=== Ukraine ===
In March 2014, Serb volunteers calling themselves Chetniks, led by Serbian ultra-nationalist Bratislav Živković, travelled to Sevastopol in Crimea to support the pro-Russian side in the Crimean crisis. They spoke of "common Slavic blood and Orthodox faith", cited similarities with the Cossacks, and claimed to be returning the favour of Russian volunteers who fought on the Serbian side of the Yugoslav Wars. Participating in the ongoing fighting in eastern Ukraine since its inception in early 2014, it was reported in August 2014 that Chetniks killed 23 Ukrainian soldiers and took out a "significant amount of armored vehicles" during clashes with the Ukrainian army. Most of the sympathisers are from Serbia, Serb-inhabited areas of Montenegro and Bosnia-Herzegovina and, according to Ukrainian sources, they killed hundreds of Ukrainians during the war. According to a Serb paramilitary fighter in Ukraine, Milutin Malisić, who was a former fighter in Kosovo, stated that "Serbs have a responsibility to their Orthodox Brethren."

Chetnik fighters of the Jovan Šević Detachment in Ukraine, 2014. Bratislav Živković is seen in the center of the second row.

According to Belgrade-based security expert Zoran Dragišić, it is indoctrination that draws young Serbian people, some of them almost children, to join the war. A 2014 law in Serbia denounces war tourism among Serb nationals as illegal and in 2018, Serb paramilitary chief Bratislav Živković was arrested in Serbia for having joined the separatist movement in Ukraine. Živković was banned from Romania for 15 years in 2017 after having spied on NATO bases in 2017.

In June 2018, Ukraine's General Prosecutor's Office launched an investigation into 54 suspected members of a pro-Russian foreign legion. Among the suspects were six Serbs, who later fought in Syria, taking part in attacks on Ukrainian troops in the eastern part of the country in 2014. Former special police spokesperson Radomir Počuča posted regular videos, photos and Esther entries on Facebook. Ukrainian ambassador in Serbia Oleksandr Aleksandrovych stated in November 2017 that Serbia was not doing enough to stop Serbian nationals from fighting in eastern Ukraine. Aleksandrovych stated that roughly 300 Serbs were operating in Ukraine, and he stated that Serb tourists would be halted at the border, and if acting suspicious, would be arrested since they were "there to kill Ukrainians". Kyiv then warned Belgrade. Serbian Foreign Minister Ivica Dačić insisted that Serbia respected Ukraine's territorial integrity.

Živković would be killed by Ukrainian forces on 3 January 2025 during the Kursk offensive.

=== Australia ===
Some Serbian Australians are members of the "Serbian Chetniks Australia" organisation. This organisation promotes the concept of Chetnik forces fighting against the Nazi and Italian regimes during the Second World War and as a result has participated in Anzac Day marches in Melbourne and Sydney. This is a highly controversial move due to Chetnik collaboration with Axis forces during the war and has attracted criticism from both Croatian Australian and Bosnian Australian communities.

== Derogatory usage ==
The term "Chetnik" is sometimes used as a derogatory term for a Serbian nationalist or an ethnic Serb in general. According to Jasminka Udovički, during the Croatian War of Independence, the Croatian media referred to Serbs as "bearded Chetnik hordes", "terrorists and conspirators" and a "people ill inclined to democracy". Demonizing "Serbo-Chetnik terrorists" became a main preoccupation. During the Bosnian War, the term found usage in the ethnic-centered propaganda war waged by the combatants, and thus, for the Bosnian side, it was increasingly used to refer to the enemy as a villain, imagined as "primitive, untidy, long-haired and bearded".

== See also ==
- List of Chetnik voivodes

== General and cited references ==
=== Books ===
- Allen, Beverly (1996). Rape Warfare: The Hidden Genocide in Bosnia-Herzegovina and Croatia. Ithaca: University of Minnesota Press. ISBN 978-0-8014-4158-5.
- Bailey, Ronald H. (1998). Partisans and guerrillas. Chicago, Illinois: Time-Life Books. ISBN 978-0-7835-5719-9.
- Bakke, Elisabeth (2010). "Party Systems Since 1989". In Ramet, Sabrina P. (ed.). Central and Southeast European Politics Since 1989. Cambridge: Cambridge University Press. pp. 64–90. ISBN 978-1-139-48750-4.
- Bank, Jan; Gevers, Lieve (2016). Churches and Religion in the Second World War. London: Bloomsbury Publishing. ISBN 978-1-4725-0480-7.
- Bartrop, Paul R. (2012). A Biographical Encyclopedia of Contemporary Genocide. Santa Barbara: ABC-CLIO. ISBN 978-0-313-38679-4.
- Laqueur, Walter; Baumel, Judith Tydor, eds. (2001). The Holocaust Encyclopedia. New Haven, Connecticut: Yale University Press. ISBN 0-300-08432-3.
- Bećirević, Edina (2014). Genocide on the Drina River. Yale University Press. ISBN 9780300192582.
- Bianchini, Stefano (2010). "The EU in the Values and Expectations of Serbia". In Listhaug, Ola; Ramet, Sabrina P.; Dulić, Dragana (eds.). Civic and Uncivic Values: Serbia in the Post-Milošević Era. Budapest: Central European University Press. pp. 221–240. ISBN 978-963-9776-98-2.
- Bugajski, Janusz (2002). Political Parties of Eastern Europe: A Guide to Politics in the Post-Communist Era. Armonk: M. E. Sharpe. ISBN 978-0-7656-2016-3.
- Burzanović, Tihomir-Tiho (1998). Dva metka za Pavelića (in Serbian). Kulturni centar "Sveti Sava".
- Cigar, Norman (1995). Genocide in Bosnia: The Policy of "Ethnic Cleansing". College Station: University of Minnesota Press. ISBN 978-1-58544-004-7.
- Cohen, Philip J. (1996). Serbia's Secret War: Propaganda and the Deceit of History. College Station: Texas A&M University Press. ISBN 978-0-89096-760-7.
- Dizdar, Zdravko; Sobolevski, Mihael (1999). Prešućivani četnički zločini u Hrvatskoj i u Bosni i Hercegovini 1941–1945 (in Croatian). Zagreb: Croatian Institute of History & Dom i svijet. ISBN 953-6491-28-1.
- Deak, Istvan (2018). Europe on Trial: The Story of Collaboration, Resistance, and Retribution during World War II. London: Taylor & Francis. ISBN 978-0-429-97350-5.
- Ekmečić, Milorad (2007). Dugo kretanje između klanja i oranja: Istorija Srba u Novom Veku 1492–1992. Zavod za udžbenike. ISBN 9788617145147.
- Figa, Jozef (2004). "Framing the Conflict: Slovenia in Search of Her Army". Civil-Military Relations, Nation Building, and National Identity: Comparative Perspectives. Westport, Connecticut: Praeger. ISBN 978-0-313-04645-2.
- Fischer, Bernd J. (2007). Balkan Strongmen: Dictators and Authoritian Rulers of Southeast Europe. Purdue University Press. ISBN 978-1-55753-455-2.
- Ford, Kirk (1992). OSS and the Yugoslav Resistance, 1943–1945. College Station, Texas: Texas A&M University Press. ISBN 978-1-58544-040-5.
- Goldstein, Ivo (1999). Croatia: A History. London: C. Hurst & Co. ISBN 978-1-85065-525-1.
- Hoare, Marko Attila (2001). "Civilian-Military Relations in Bosnia-Herzegovina 1992–1995". In Magaš, Branka; Žanić, Ivo (eds.). The War in Croatia and Bosnia-Herzegovina 1991–1995. London: Frank Cass. pp. 178–199. ISBN 978-0-7146-8201-3.
- Hoare, Marko Attila (2006). Genocide and Resistance in Hitler's Bosnia: The Partisans and the Chetniks 1941–1943. New York: Oxford University Press. ISBN 978-0-19-726380-8.
- Hoare, Marko Attila (2007). The History of Bosnia: From the Middle Ages to the Present Day. London: Saqi. ISBN 978-0-86356-953-1.
- Hoare, Marko Attila (2013). Bosnian Muslims in the Second World War. Oxford, UK: Oxford University Press. ISBN 978-0-231-70394-9.
- Hockenos, Paul (2003). Homeland Calling: Exile Patriotism and the Balkan Wars. Ithaca: Cornell University Press. ISBN 978-0-8014-4158-5.
- Höpken, Wolfgang (2007). "Between Civic Identity and Nationalism: History Textbooks in East-Central and Southeastern Europe". In Ramet, Sabrina P.; Matić, Davorka (eds.). Democratic Transition in Croatia: Value Transformation, Education, and Media. College Station: Texas A&M University Press. pp. 163–192. ISBN 978-1-60344-452-1.
- Jelić-Butić, Fikreta (1986). Četnici u Hrvatskoj, 1941–1945 [The Chetniks in Croatia, 1941–1945] (in Serbo-Croatian). Zagreb: Globus. ISBN 978-86-343-0010-9.
- Judah, Tim (2000). The Serbs: History, Myth and the Destruction of Yugoslavia. New Haven: Yale University Press. ISBN 978-0-300-08507-5.
- Karabegović, Osman (1988). Bosanska krajina nepresušivi izvor revolucionarnih snaga. Vojnoizdavački i novinski centar.
- Karchmar, Lucien (1987). Draža Mihailović and the Rise of the Četnik Movement, 1941–1945. New York: Garland Publishing. ISBN 978-0-8240-8027-3.
- Krestić, Vasilije (2004). Great Serbia: truth, misconceptions, abuses : papers presented at the International Scientific Meeting held in the Serbian Academy of Sciences and Arts Belgrade, October 24–26, 2002. SANU. ISBN 978-86-7025-377-3.
- Lukic, Rénéo; Lynch, Allen (1996). Europe From the Balkans to the Urals: The Disintegration of Yugoslavia and the Soviet Union. Oxford University Press. ISBN 978-0-19-829200-5.
- Macartney, C. A. (1957). October Fifteenth: A History of Modern Hungary, 1929–1945. Vol. II. Edinburgh: Edinburgh University Press.
- MacDonald, David Bruce (2002). Balkan Holocausts?: Serbian and Croatian Victim Centered Propaganda and the War in Yugoslavia. Manchester: Manchester University Press. ISBN 978-0-7190-6467-8.
- Martin, David (1946). Ally betrayed, the uncensored story of Tito and Mihailovich. New York: Prentice-Hall.
- Magaš, Branka; Žanić, Ivo (2001). The War in Croatia and Bosnia-Herzegovina 1991–1995. London: Frank Cass. ISBN 978-0-7146-8201-3.
- Malcolm, Noel (1994). Bosnia: A Short History. New York: New York University Press. ISBN 978-0-8147-5520-4.
- Matković, Hrvoje (2002). Povijest Nezavisne Države Hrvatske (in Croatian). Naklada Pavičić. ISBN 978-953-6308-39-2.
- Mennecke, Martin (2012). "Genocidal Violence in the Former Yugoslavia". In Totten, Samuel; Parsons, William S. (eds.). Centuries of Genocide: Essays and Eyewitness Accounts. New York: Routledge. ISBN 978-0-415-87191-4.
- Milazzo, Matteo J. (1975). The Chetnik Movement & the Yugoslav Resistance. Baltimore: Johns Hopkins University Press. ISBN 978-0-8018-1589-8.
- Mitrović, Andrej (2007). Serbia's Great War, 1914–1918. West Lafayette: Purdue University Press. ISBN 978-1-55753-476-7.
- Mojzes, Paul (2011). Balkan Genocides: Holocaust and Ethnic Cleansing in the 20th Century. Lanham, Maryland: Rowman & Littlefield. ISBN 978-1-4422-0665-6.
- Newman, John Paul (2015). Yugoslavia in the Shadow of War: Veterans and the Limits of State Building, 1903–1945. Cambridge University Press. ISBN 978-1-107-07076-9.
- Pajović, Radoje (1977). Kontrarevolucija u Crnoj Gori: Četnički i federalistički pokret 1941–1945 (in Serbo-Croatian). Cetinje, Yugoslavia: Obod.
- Pavlaković, Vjeran (2005). "Serbia Transformed?". In Ramet, Sabrina P. (ed.). Serbia since 1989: Politics and Society under Milosevic and After. Seattle: University of Washington Press. ISBN 978-0-295-80207-7.
- Pavlowitch, Stevan K. (2002). Serbia: the History behind the Name. London: C. Hurst & Co. Publishers. ISBN 978-1-85065-476-6.
- Pavlowitch, Stevan K. (2007). Hitler's New Disorder: The Second World War in Yugoslavia. New York: Columbia University Press. ISBN 978-1-85065-895-5.
- Petranović, Branko (1981). Istorija Jugoslavije: 1918–1978. Nolit.
- Popović, Jovo; Lolić, Marko; Latas, Branko (1988). Pop izdaje: Četnički vojvoda Momčilo Đujić [Traitor Priest: The Chetnik Vojvoda Momčilo Đujić] (PDF) (in Serbo-Croatian). Zagreb: Stvarnost. ISBN 978-86-7075-039-5.
- Prusin, Alexander (2017). Serbia Under the Swastika: A World War II Occupation. Urbana: University of Illinois Press. ISBN 978-0-252-09961-8.
- Ramet, Sabrina P. (2006). The Three Yugoslavias: State-Building and Legitimation, 1918–2005. Bloomington: Indiana University Press. ISBN 978-0-253-34656-8.
- Ramet, Sabrina P. (2008). Serbia, Croatia and Slovenia at Peace and at War: Selected Writings, 1983–2007. Berlin: LIT Verlag. ISBN 978-3-03735-912-9.
- Ramet, Sabrina P. (2010a). "Politics in Croatia Since 1990". In Ramet, Sabrina P. (ed.). Central and Southeast European Politics Since 1989. Cambridge: Cambridge University Press. pp. 258–285. ISBN 978-1-139-48750-4.
- Ramet, Sabrina P. (2010b). "Serbia and Montenegro Since 1989". In Ramet, Sabrina P. (ed.). Central and Southeast European Politics Since 1989. Cambridge: Cambridge University Press. pp. 286–310. ISBN 978-1-139-48750-4.
- Ramet, Sabrina P.; Wagner, Peter F. (2010). "Post-socialist Models of Rule in Central and Southeast Europe". In Ramet, Sabrina P. (ed.). Central and Southeast European Politics Since 1989. Cambridge: Cambridge University Press. pp. 9–36. ISBN 978-1-139-48750-4.
- Redžić, Enver (2005). Bosnia and Herzegovina in the Second World War. Abingdon: Frank Cass. ISBN 978-0-7146-5625-0.
- Roberts, Walter R. (1987). Tito, Mihailović and the Allies: 1941–1945. New Brunswick, NJ: Duke University Press. ISBN 978-0-8223-0773-0.
- Röhr, Werner, ed. (1994). Europa unterm Hakenkreuz: Okkupation und Kollaboration (1938–1945) (in German). Berlin: Hüthig.
- Ron, James (2003). Frontiers and Ghettos: State Violence in Serbia and Israel. Berkeley: University of California Press. ISBN 978-0-520-93690-4.
- Sadkovich, James J. (1998). The U.S. Media and Yugoslavia, 1991–1995. Greenwood Publishing Group. ISBN 978-0-275-95046-0.
- Samardžić, Radovan; Duškov, Milan (1993). Serbs in European Civilization. Belgrade, Serbia and Montenegro: Nova. ISBN 978-86-7583-015-3.
- Sells, Michael Anthony (1998). The Bridge Betrayed: Religion and Genocide in Bosnia. Berkeley: University of California Press. ISBN 978-0-520-92209-9.
- Shub, Boris (1943). Hitler's Ten-Year War on the Jews. New York: Institute of Jewish Affairs.
- Singleton, Frederick Bernard (1985). A Short History of the Yugoslav Peoples. New York: Cambridge University Press. ISBN 978-0-521-27485-2.
- Sirotković, Hodimir; Margetić, Lujo (1988). Povijest država i prava naroda SFR Jugoslavije [The History of the States and the Rights of the People of SFR Yugoslavia] (in Serbo-Croatian). Zagreb: Školska knj. ISBN 978-86-03-99180-2.
- Stojanović, Dubravka (2010). "Value Changes in the Interpretations of History in Serbia". In Listhaug, Ola; Ramet, Sabrina P.; Dulić, Dragana (eds.). Civic and Uncivic Values: Serbia in the Post-Milošević Era. Budapest: Central European University Press. pp. 221–240. ISBN 978-963-9776-98-2.
- Tanner, Marcus (2001). Croatia : a nation forged in war (2nd ed.). New Haven; London: Yale University Press. ISBN 0-300-09125-7.
- Tasić, Dmitar (2020). Paramilitarism in the Balkans: Yugoslavia, Bulgaria, and Albania, 1917–1924. Oxford: Oxford University Press. ISBN 978-0-19-189922-5.
- Tasić, Nikola (1995). Историја Београда [History of Belgrade] (in Serbo-Croatian). Балканолошки институт САНУ [Balkan Institute of SANU]. ISBN 978-86-7179-021-5.
- Tillotson, Michael (2011). SOE and The Resistance: As told in The Times Obituaries. A&C Black. ISBN 978-1-4411-4356-3.
- Thomas, Robert (1999). Serbia Under Milošević: Politics in the 1990s. London: C. Hurst. ISBN 978-1-85065-367-7.
- Toal, Gerard; Dahlman, Carl T. (2011). Bosnia Remade: Ethnic Cleansing and Its Reversal. New York: Oxford University Press. ISBN 978-0-19-973036-0.
- Totten, Samuel; Bartrop, Paul R. (2008). Dictionary of Genocide. Vol. I. ABC-CLIO. ISBN 978-0-313-34642-2.
- Timofejev, Aleksej (2010). "Crvena armija i JVuO tokom jeseni 1944 – nesuđena saradnja". Istorija 20. Veka. Vol. 1. Institut za noviju istoriju Srbije. pp. 85–102.
- Tomasevich, Jozo (1969). "Yugoslavia During the Second World War". In Vucinich, Wayne S. (ed.). Contemporary Yugoslavia: Twenty Years of Socialist Experiment. Berkeley: University of California Press. pp. 59–118. OCLC 652337606.
- Tomasevich, Jozo (1975). War and Revolution in Yugoslavia, 1941–1945: The Chetniks. Stanford: Stanford University Press. ISBN 978-0-8047-0857-9.
- Tomasevich, Jozo (2001). War and Revolution in Yugoslavia, 1941–1945: Occupation and Collaboration. Stanford: Stanford University Press. ISBN 978-0-8047-3615-2.
- Trbovich, Ana S. (2008). A Legal Geography of Yugoslavia's Disintegration. New York: Oxford University Press. ISBN 978-0-19-533343-5.
- The German Campaigns in the Balkans (Spring 1941). Washington, D.C.: United States Army Center of Military History. 1986 [1953]. OCLC 16940402. CMH Pub 104-4. Archived from the original on 19 June 2009.
- Velikonja, Mitja (2003). Religious Separation and Political Intolerance in Bosnia-Herzegovina. College Station: Texas A&M University Press. ISBN 978-1-58544-226-3.
- Latas, Branko; Dželebdžić, Milovan (1979). Četnički pokret Draže Mihailovića. Belgrade: Beogradski Izdavačko-grafički zavod.
- Radanović, Milan (2016). Kazna i zločin:Snage kolaboracije u Srbiji. Belgrade: Rosa Luxemburg Stiftung.
- Veljan, Nejra; Ćehajić, Maida (2020). "A Dangerous Nexus? History, Ideology and the Structure of the Contemporary Chetnik Movement". Democracy and Security in Southeastern Europe. VII (1). Sarajevo, Bosnia and Herzegovina: Atlantic Initiative: 22–40. ISSN 1986-5708.
- West, Richard (2012). Tito and the Rise and Fall of Yugoslavia. Faber & Faber. ISBN 978-0-571-28110-7.
- Yeomans, Rory (2012). Visions of Annihilation: The Ustasha Regime and the Cultural Politics of Fascism, 1941–1945. Pittsburgh: University of Pittsburgh Press. ISBN 9780822977933.

=== Journals ===
- Hehn, Paul N. (1971). "Serbia, Croatia and Germany 1941–1945: Civil War and Revolution in the Balkans". Canadian Slavonic Papers. 13 (4). University of Alberta: 344–373. doi:10.1080/00085006.1971.11091249. JSTOR 40866373.
- Jeffrey, Alex (2006). "Building State Capacity in Post-conflict Bosnia and Herzegovina: The Case of Brcko District" (PDF). Political Geography. 25 (2). Elsevier: 203–227. doi:10.1016/j.polgeo.2005.11.003. Archived from the original (PDF) on 1 February 2014.
- Pavlowitch, Stevan K. (May 2005). "Review of Le Monténégro et l'Italie durant la Seconde Guerre mondiale: Histoire, mythes et réalités by Antoine Sidoti". The English Historical Review. 120 (487): 863. doi:10.1093/ehr/cei317.
- Newman, John Paul (2017). "War Veterans, Fascism, and Para-Fascist Departures in the Kingdom of Yugoslavia, 1918–1941". Fascism. 6: 42–74. doi:10.1163/22116257-00601003.

=== News ===
- Binder, David (13 September 1999). "Momcilo Djujic, Serbian Priest and Warrior, Dies at 92". The New York Times.
- "Bora Čorba kod Hrge: Ponosan sam četnik". Dnevnik. 22 January 2007. Archived from the original on 28 February 2019.
- Bosnia and Herzegovina: Country Reports on Human Rights Practices (Report). U.S. Department of State. 4 March 2002.
- Burns, John F. (10 May 1992). "The Demographics of Exile: Victorious Serbs Repopulate Croatian Villages". The New York Times.
- "Chetniks rehabilitated". B92. 17 May 2005. Archived from the original on 16 January 2014.
- "Četnici "personae non gratae"" [Chetniks "persona non grata"]. B92 (in Serbo-Croatian). 23 December 2004.
- "Četnički simboli u Srebrenici" [Chetniks Symbols in Srebrenica]. Index (in Serbo-Croatian). 13 July 2009.
- Ćirić, Aleksandar (23 December 2004). "Četnici – Partizani 12:5". Vreme.
- "Controversial group in Srebrenica incident". B92. 13 July 2009. Archived from the original on 4 November 2012.
- Dimitrijević, Bojan B. (2014). Vojska Nedićeve Srbije: Oružane snage srpske vlade, 1941–1945 [The Army of Nedić's Serbia: The Armed Forces of the Serbian Government, 1941–1945] (in Serbian). Belgrade: Službeni Glasnik. ISBN 978-86-519-1811-0.
- Engelberg, Stephen (10 December 1991). "Serbs in Croatia Build Political Foundation to Support Their Military Gains". The New York Times.
- Gudžević, Sinan (18 June 2010). "Na kapi zvezda, u glavi kokarda". e-Novine (in Serbo-Croatian).
- Horvat, Karmen (13 July 2009). "Chetniks Urinate on Bosnia-Herzegovina Flag". Dalje. Archived from the original on 19 October 2012.
- "Incidenti u Srebrenici i Bratuncu: Četničko orgijanje ne zanima tužioce?" [Incidents in Srebrenica and Bratunac: Chetnik Orgies Do Not Faze Prosecutors?]. 24 sata (in Serbo-Croatian). 7 August 2009. Archived from the original on 11 August 2018.
- "Istetoviran mu Draža Mihailović: Gurović se vraća u Crvenu Zvezdu!". Dnevnik. 27 August 2010.
- Jungvirth, Goran (14 June 2013). "Seselj Denies Close Cooperation with Karadzic". Institute for War & Peace Reporting. Archived from the original on 9 July 2014.
- Kebo, Amra (1 May 2005). "US Sanctions Alarm Bosnians". Institute for War & Peace Reporting.
- "Ko je ubijao u Antinu?". B92 (in Serbo-Croatian). 17 June 2005.
- Kusmuk, Milica (18 August 2013). "Spomenik Draži Mihailoviću kod Višegrada". Novosti (in Serbo-Croatian).
- "Ministarka kulture zabranila podizanje spomenika Đurišiću". B92 (in Serbo-Croatian). 11 June 2003.
- "Montenegrin WWII veterans protest against unveiling of Chetnik monument". BBC. 19 May 2003.
- "Montenegrin police destroy base for monument to controversial WWII leader". BBC. 7 July 2003.
- "Montenegro: Muslims condemn plan to unveil monument to WWII warlord". BBC. 20 June 2003.
- "NOVA predlaže da država podigne spomenik Pavlu Đurišiću". Vijesti (in Serbo-Croatian). 13 August 2011. Archived from the original on 9 June 2012.
- "Paljenje zastave BiH: Nema kazni za četničko divljanje" [Burning of the BiH Flag: No Sanctions for Chetnik Rampage]. 24 sata. 24 February 2010. Archived from the original on 11 August 2018.
- Pavlović, Momčilo; Mladenović, Božica (26 May 2003). "Život i smrt Koste Pećanca" [Life and Death of Kosta Pećanac]. Glas Javnosti (in Serbo-Croatian).
- Pećanin, Senad (2 August 2002). "Our Local Chetniks". Dani. Archived from the original on 1 April 2018.
- Phillips, John (31 July 2005). "Patriarch backs party led by war-crimes suspect". The Independent.
- "Policija srušila postolje za spomenik Đurišiću". B92 (in Serbo-Croatian). 7 July 2003.
- "Predsjednik Mesić o odgodi posjeta SCG-u". HRT. 17 May 2005. Archived from the original on 17 November 2007.
- Prijović, Zvonko (7 May 2002). "Crnogorska Ravna gora". Glas javnosti (in Serbo-Croatian).
- Prijović, Zvonko (13 June 2003). "Neće biti obeležja Pavlu Đurišiću". Glas javnosti (in Serbo-Croatian).
- "Ravnogorski sabor". B92. 13 May 2007.
- "Ravnogorski sabor, 15. put". B92. 13 May 2006.
- "Rehabilitovan Dragiša Vasić" [Dragiša Vasić Rehabilitated]. Blic (in Serbo-Croatian). 15 December 2009.
- Ristic, Marija (6 March 2014). "Serbian Fighters Help 'Russian Brothers' in Crimea". Balkan Insight.
- Sekulović, Milutin (10 June 2003). "Partizanski komandant, pa – vojvoda". Večernje novosti (in Serbo-Croatian).
- "Serb Leader Momcilo Djujic Dies; Led Chetniks During World War II". The Washington Times. 14 September 1999.
- "Serbian player not allowed into Croatia". ESPN. 13 November 2004.
- Silber, Laura (3 August 1993). "Serbia's Ultranationalist Leader Emerges as Formidable Political Force". Los Angeles Times.
- "Sramotno: četničko orgijanje po Srebrenici i Bratuncu" [Shameful: Chetnik Orgies in Srebrenica and Bratunac]. Slobodna Dalamacija. 13 July 2009.
- Strauss, Julius (29 December 2003). "Party leader pulls election strings from prison cell". The Telegraph.
- Voloder, Vanda (12 July 2007). "Četnici bili u Srebrenici, ali policija nije reagirala" [Chetniks Were in Srebrenica, But Police Did Not Respond]. 24 sata. Archived from the original on 13 November 2009.
- "Zabranjen skup za otkrivanje spomenika Đurišiću". B92 (in Serbo-Croatian). 4 July 2003.

=== Web ===
- "-nik". Online Etymology Dictionary. 2020.
- "cete". merriam-webster.com. Merriam-Webster.
- "chetnik". Online Etymology Dictionary. 2020.
