= Drvar uprising =

Serbian uprising during World War II

- Part of World War II in Yugoslavia
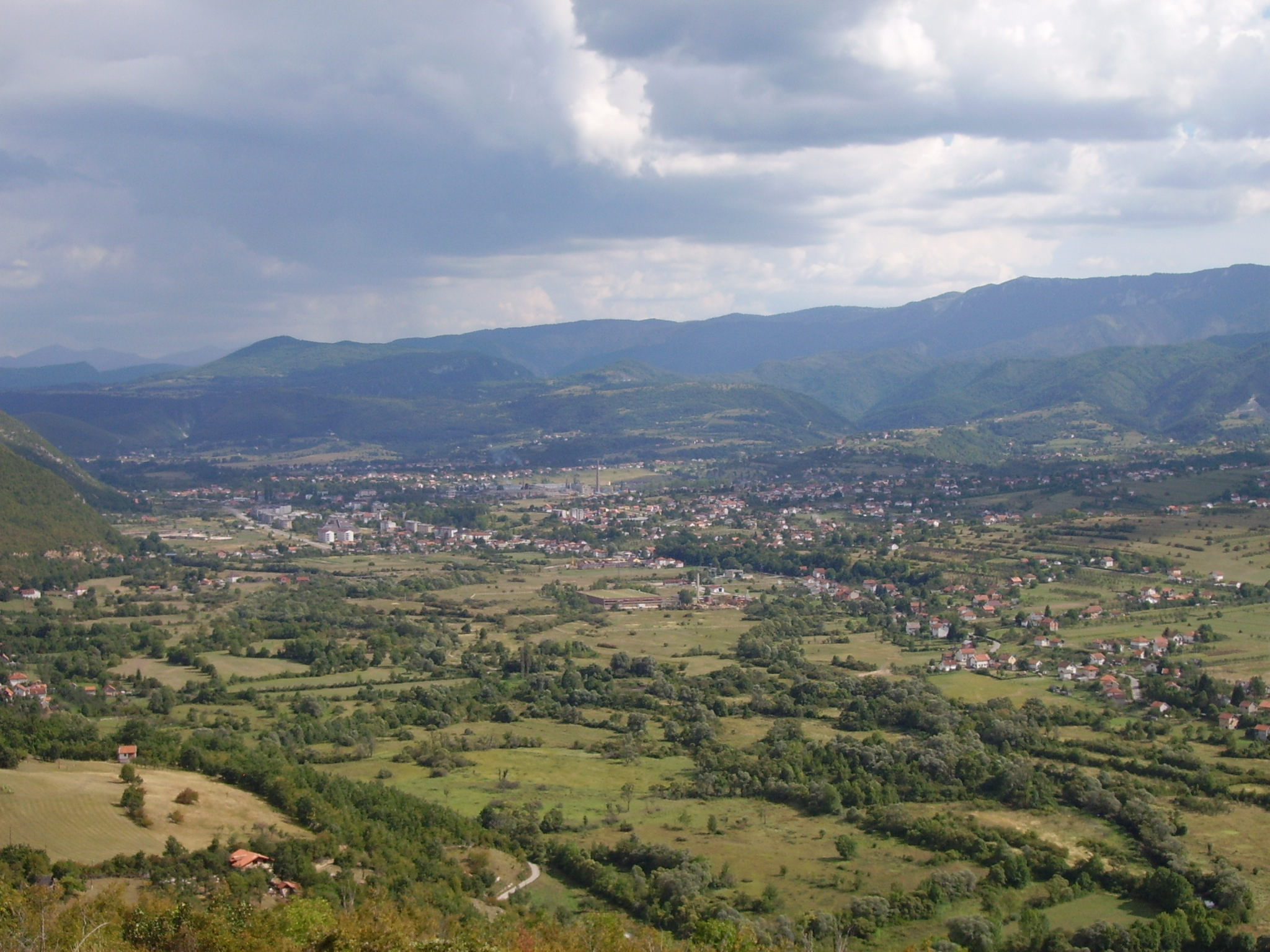
- Drvar in 2007
Date	27 July 1941 — 26 September 1941
Location	Drvar, Independent State of Croatia (present-day Bosnia and Herzegovina)
Result	Rebel victory: Rebels captured the whole region of Western Bosnia

Belligerents
Independent State of Croatia	Initially: HQ of Guerrilla Detachments for Bosnian Grahovo and Surrounding Later division: Yugoslav Partisans; Chetniks

Commanders and leaders
Logornik Kazimir Kuharski; Vladimir Vlatko Marek	Ljubo Babić; Milutin Morača; Slavko Rodić; Zdravko Čelar; Mane Rokvić; Ilija Desnica; Branko Bogunović; Vlado Morača; Uroš Drenović; Lazar Tešanović

Units involved
Independent State of Croatia; Croatian Home Guard; Ustaše Militia	Crvljevica detachment; Zaglavica detachment; Kamenica detachment; Javor detachment

Strength
Initially 400; Reinforcements of Croatian Army; 8 battalions; several artillery batteries	Initially; 4 detachments; After the expansion of the uprising; 4,000 Serb rebels

Casualties and losses
Deaths in the Battle for Drvar: 25 Ustaše; 5 Home Guard; Unknown in the rest of uprising	Unknown
- More than 1,000 or more than 3,000 Muslim and Croatian civilians massacred in Drvar, Kulen Vakuf, Trubar, Bosansko Grahovo, Vrtoče and Krnjeuša

The Drvar uprising (Serbian: Устанак у Дрвару) was the World War II uprising of the Serb population of Bosnian Krajina (present-day Bosnia and Herzegovina). Italy supported it, both politically and in arms, in its struggle against the fascist puppet state of the Independent State of Croatia between 27 July and 26 September 1941.

The genocidal activities of the Independent State of Croatia forced the Serb population to organize an uprising. It had no ideological background and was simply a struggle for physical survival, with rebels considering themselves guerrilla. Italy used the uprising to create an opening to establish its influence beyond the zones of Croatia it already occupied per formal agreements.

A group of Serb nationalist rebels first attacked Croatian military units on 26 July 1941 in Pasjak near Drvar. This attack and subsequent conflicts later that day sped up the mass uprising of Serbs from the region of Bosnian Krajina and Lika. The uprising started with the attack of four rebel detachments on the Drvar garrison of the Croatian army, which consisted of 400 Ustaše and Home Guard soldiers, early on 27 July. The rebels captured Drvar that afternoon, along with nearby Oštrelj and Bosansko Grahovo.

The uprising had an immediate influence on other regions of Bosnian Krajina and the nearby region of Lika. When Serbs from Lika were informed about the uprising in Drvar, they decided to start the Srb uprising on the same day. On the first day of uprising, the Serb rebels from Bosnian Krajina and Lika managed to seize control over territory 270 kilometres (170 mi) long and 45 kilometres (28 mi) wide. The communists gradually forged their Partisan republic, and on 30 July, they established the Military-Revolutionary Council, which became the supreme governing institution for the entire region.

During the next two months, rebels managed to capture additional territory including Mrkonjić Grad, Kulen Vakuf and many other Western Bosnian towns. Several retaliatory massacres of Muslim and Croatian war prisoners and civilians were committed by rebels, including the Trubar massacre, Bosansko Grahovo massacre, Vrtoče massacre, Krnjeuša massacre and Kulen Vakuf massacre. The number of victims is estimated to be between 1,000 and over 3,000 people.

Based on agreement with non-communist rebel leaders, the Second Italian Army peacefully took control over the region and temporarily shielded local Serbs from the Independent State of Croatia on 26 September 1941. The communists were dissatisfied and continued armed attacks, primarily against other non-communist rebels. To fight against Chetniks who gained substantial support of the local population, the communists established two Anti-Chetnik Battalions in March and April 1942 and reestablished their control over the region of Drvar at the beginning of July 1942.

== Background ==
The Independent State of Croatia (NDH) was founded on 10 April 1941 during the invasion of Yugoslavia by the Axis powers. The NDH consisted of most of modern-day Croatia and Bosnia and Herzegovina, together with some parts of modern-day Serbia. It was essentially an Italo-German quasi-protectorate, as it owed its existence to the Axis powers, who maintained occupation forces within the puppet state throughout its existence.

According to the Treaties of Rome between Benito Mussolini and Ante Pavelić, Italy annexed Zone I, and Zone II was demilitarized. After that, Italy pulled out the bulk of its army from Zones II and III.

In the weeks following the invasion, the Communist Party of Yugoslavia (Serbo-Croatian Latin: Komunistička partija Jugoslavije, KPJ) managed to tie up its cells. Some members of the KPJ and the Union of Communist Youth of Yugoslavia (Serbo-Croatian Latin: Savez komunističke omladine Jugoslavije, SKOJ) were returnees from the defeated Royal Yugoslav Army, including Zdravko Čelar, Slavko Rodić, and Rajko Bosnić. There were also students like Ilija Došen, and workers and refugees from Hungarian-occupied Bačka, including Milutin and Pero Morača. KPJ committees in Drvar and Bosansko Grahovo succeeded in obtaining rifles, light machine guns, and ammunition belonging to the surrendered Royal Yugoslav Army, and hid them from German, Italian and later Ustashe searches. Independent of the efforts of the KPJ, local peasants also hid arms.

During late April and early May, Ustashe couldn't easily consolidate their rule in an area with a predominantly Serbian population. They were only able to achieve that with Italian support and a Ustashe squad brought in from Herzegovina. Italian units left Drvar area in the beginning of June.

After the NDH consolidated its rule in Drvar at the end of May 1941, Ustaše imprisoned many Serbian men from Drvar and began with preparation to imprison and indiscriminately kill all Serbs from Drvar.

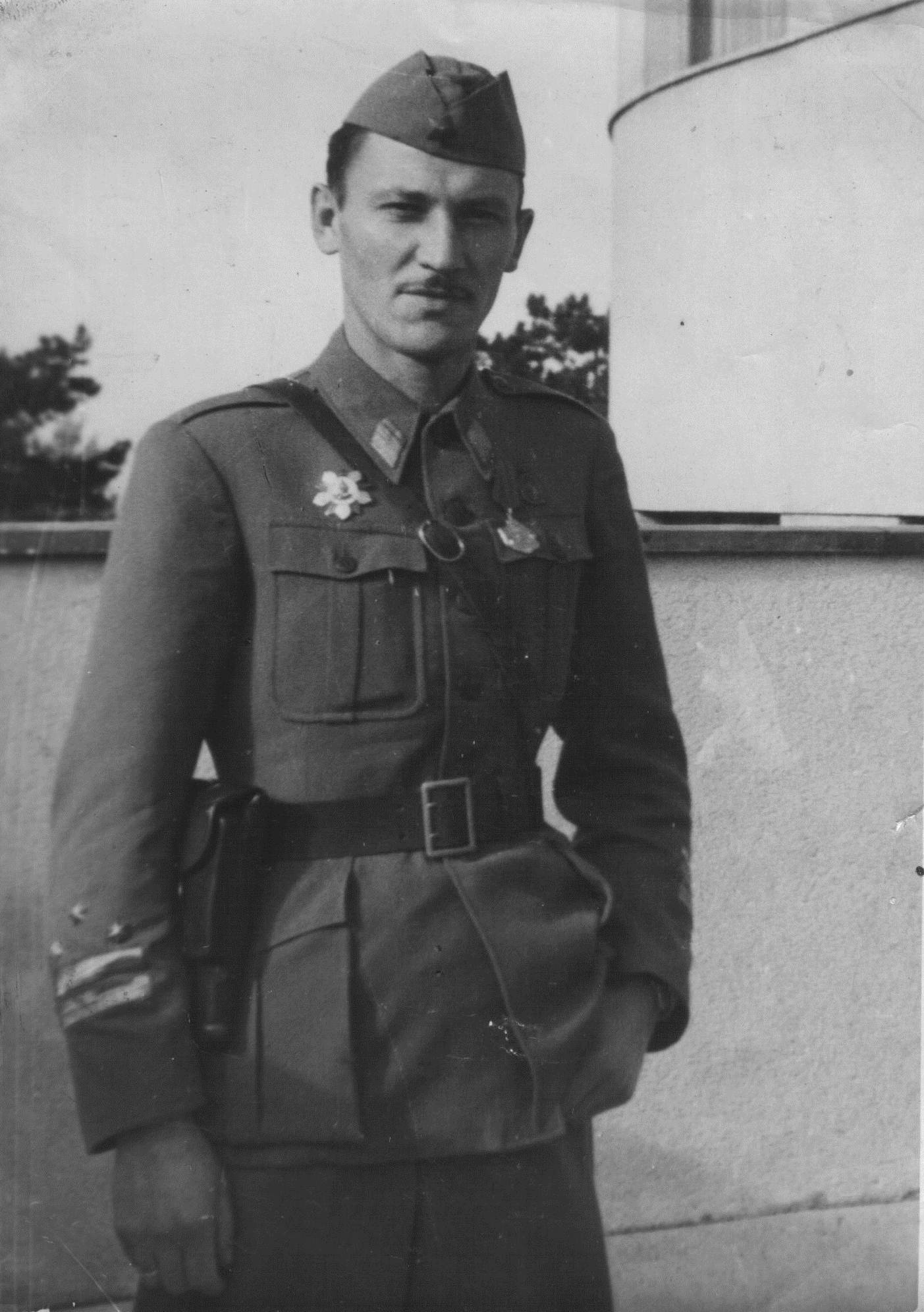
Milutin Morača

Through June, communists across Bosanska Krajina continued to prepare for an uprising. Ljubo Babić was chosen to be the head of the military committee for Drvar, and Ilija Došen was chosen for Bosanski Petrovac. Axis invasion of the Soviet Union encouraged locals to accelerate preparations. Ustashe authority anticipated rebellion, so reinforcements were brought to the area. The Party advised Drvar workers who were in danger of being arrested to leave Drvar and hide in nearby villages. On 17 July, communists set up the Headquarters of Guerrilla Detachments for Bosanski Petrovac with Zdravko Čelar in command, Vaso Kelečević as his deputy and Ilija Došen as the political commissar. The following day, the Headquarters for Drvar was established, with Babić as commander and Milutin Morača as his deputy. Between 20 and 26 July, the first detachment of fifty men was formed in the village of Kamenica (commander Jole Marić, political commissar Nikola Kotla). In the following days, new detachments were formed in the villages of Javorje (commander Mile Kecman, deputy Slavko Rodić) and Crvljivci (commander Vlado Morača). In Bosansko Grahovo, a detachment was formed, with Simo Bajić as commander. In the village of Trubar, a detachment was formed, with Nikola Rodić as commander and Pero Boltić as commissar. There were also smaller detachments.

The Ustaše genocidal policy resulted in a mass uprising of Serbs which began on 27 July 1941 in Bosnian Krajina (Western Bosnia) and Lika simultaneously.

The uprising in Drvar was inspired by Orthodox priest Ilija Rodić, worker Ilija Desnica and teacher Uroš Drenović. Since 22 June 1941, more than 2 months after Axis invasion of Yugoslavia, the communists also planned to organize an uprising in Bosnian Krajina on 1 August 1941. Notably, the Central Committee of the Communist Party of Croatia pushed for rebellion only after the uprising was in its advanced stages in an attempt to shape the character of the uprising into one that pushed for communist ideals rather than mere survival.

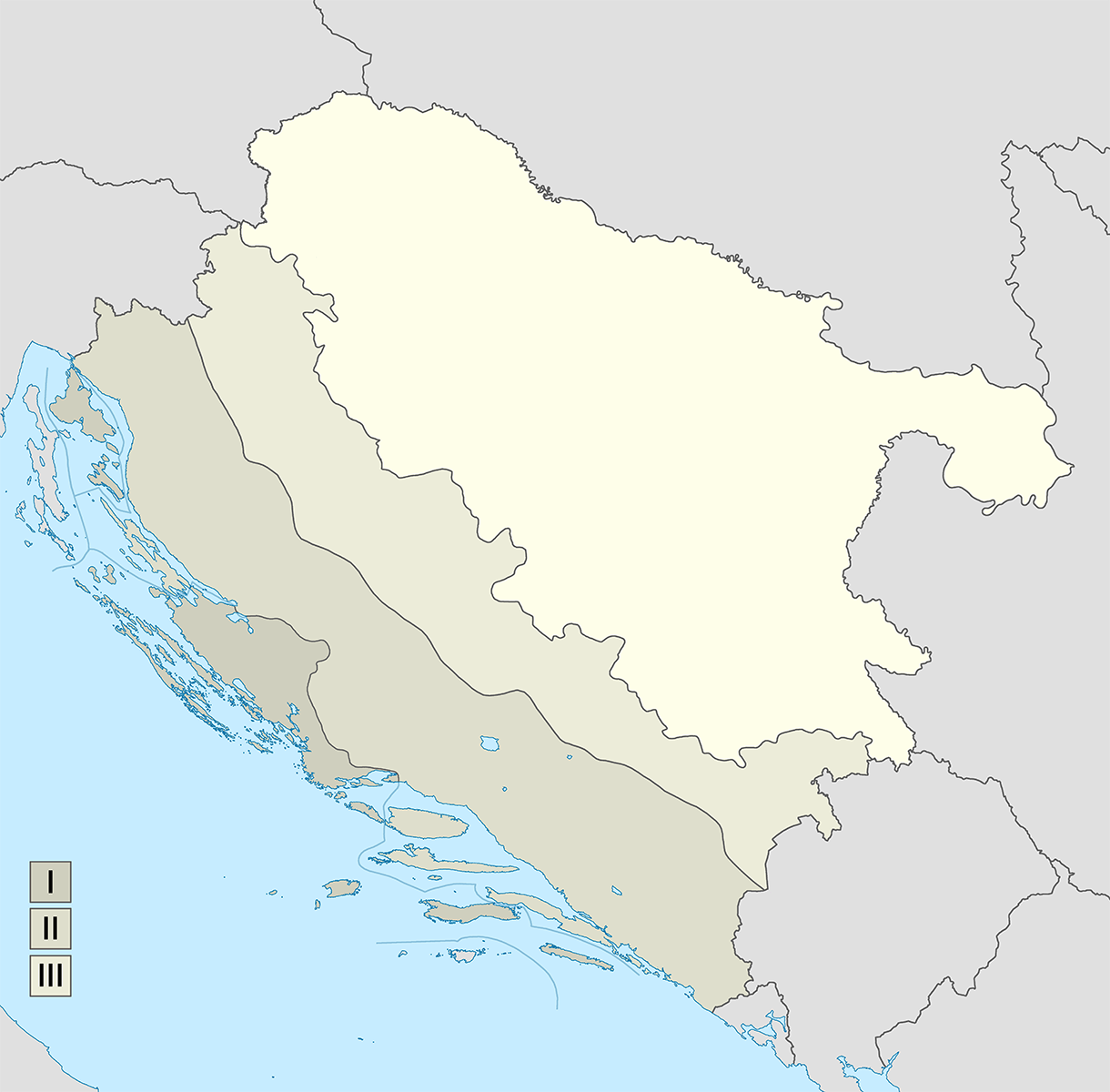
Map of the NDH showing the three Italian zones of occupation and major towns affected by Drvar uprising

== Forces ==
Initially, the Serbian uprising had no ideological background because it was a struggle for physical survival. While Croatian reports referred to the rebellion as Chetnik-Communist action, rebels simply considered themselves rebels or guerrilla. Only in September, after the Stolice conference, would communist rebels adopt the name "partisans", and nationalists around same time begun calling themselves "chetniks". Because the vast majority of rebels in Krajina and the Independent State of Croatia were Serbs in 1941 to 1942, Ustashe propaganda initially called all rebels chetniks.

One detachment of rebels were under command of Vlado Morača. Some of the rebel units were under the control or influence of the communist party while many others were not, including a group of rebels under command of Nikica Kecman. The commanders of the rebel units of Drvar district included Mane Rokvić and Branko Bogunović. Some participants of the uprising became Chetniks, like Mane Rokvić, Uroš Drenović and Ilija Desnica. The rebel forces during the uprising eventually numbered 4,000 men. The Serb rebel detachments were armed with 270 rifles and 7 machine guns.

The Drvar garrison had a total of 400 Ustaše and Croatian Home Guard soldiers of Independent Croatia.

== First rebel action ==
The Italian Military Intelligence Service reported that the uprising began on 26 July 1941 when rebels attacked isolated gendarmerie stations, railroads and communication lines. The rebels cut all telephone poles between Drvar, Grahovo and Knin.

On 26 July 1941, in a road ambush near village Pasjak, a group of Serb nationalists, including Nikica Kecman and three of his men, killed Croatian major Ferdinand Konrad who was travelling from Drvar to Prijedor by car. The ambush was actually targeted at logornik Kuharski, who had issued an order to kill 40 notable Serbs from Drvar, but was still considered a success as it ignited the uprisings in Lika and Krajina.

The Ustaše and Home Guard forces soon arrived from Drvar by train and harassed the local population until they were forced to retreat by guerrilla groups of rebels from the hamlets of Crvljivica and Zaglavica. The rebels knew the Ustaše would return. Thus, their Headquarter of Guerrilla Detachments for Bosnian Grahovo and Surrounding (Serbian: Штаб герилских одреда за Босанско Грахово и околину) decided to start the uprising early the following day, on 27 July 1941.

== Capture of Drvar ==
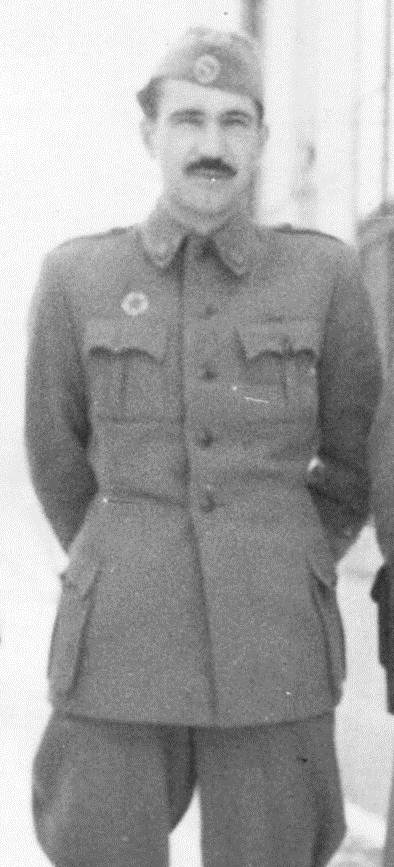
Slavko Rodić

The plan for attack on Drvar was prepared by Slavko Rodić, a partisan.

One of the rebels was local schoolteacher Lazar Tešanović who read the order for attack on Drvar using a battery lamp. The beginning of rebel attack was signaled with a fire of signal gun from the citadel on Šobića Glavica at 3:30 AM. The detachment commanded by Morača attacked a Ustaše unit in Oštrelj, a village on the road toward Bosanski Petrovac which became the first populated place under rebel control during uprising. Rajko Bosnić, who would later be recognized as a People's Hero of Yugoslavia, distinguished himself as a member of Crvljevičko-Zaglavički detachment.

The first platoon was given the order to capture Ustaše barracks in the pre-war Apprentices' Home building.

The mass uprising in Bosnian Krajina first started in Drvar on 27 July when three rebel detachments from Kamenica, Javor and Crvljivica, accompanied by hundreds of armed peasants, captured a garrison of 400 Ustaše and Home Guard soldiers in Drvar. The rebels were under the command of Mane Rokvić. In Drvar, Ustaša Mijo Sarić fired heavy machine guns at rebels from the tower of local church.

The rebels captured all surviving enemy soldiers, including 120 members of Croatian Home Guard, as well as a substantial quantity of arms and ammunition. The Croatian commanders, logornik Kuharski and Ustaša Sarić, known as Šeponja, managed to escape.

The rebels, fueled by resentment against earlier massacres of Serbs, committed numerous massacres of war prisoners, as well as Muslim and Croatian civilians. The number of victims are estimated to be between 1,000 and over 3,000 people. Some massacres occurred on the first day of the uprising, such as the Trubar massacre and Bosansko Grahovo massacre, while others happened later, such as the Krnjeuša massacre and Kulen Vakuf massacre.

== Capture of other towns ==
On 27 July 1941, the rebels captured Oštrelj and Bosansko Grahovo under the command of rebel leader Branko Bogunović. The Drvar uprising had a large impact on the development of the Srb uprising in Lika, where the largest number of communists were present, along with many armed people from Srb and the surrounding area. On the first day of the uprising, Serbian rebels from Bosnian Krajina and Lika managed to seize control over territory which was 70 kilometres (43 mi) long and 45 kilometres (28 mi) wide.

The rebel unit commanded by Simo Šolaja captured the gendarmerie station in Pljeva, while rebels from the southern part of Mrkonjić Grad municipality and rebels from Glamoč and Pljeva captured the gendarmerie stations in Gerzovo and the villages of Čardak, Podgorje, Gerzovo, Dragnić, Trnovo, Baraći, Pecka, Medna and many other villages in the southern part of Mrkonjić Grad municipality.

== Drvar Republic ==
The rebels immediately established the command of the Drvar municipality, which operated until 25 September 1941 and was reestablished at the beginning of July 1942 when Drvar was captured by communist forces. The headquarter of joint Partisan-Chetnik rebels was housed in Drvar. The Chetnik commander Uroš Drenović was subordinated to this joint headquarter. The partisans organized revolutionary court in Drvar.

Since the first days of the uprising in Bosnian Krajina, the communists gradually forged their Partisan republic, and on 30 July 1941, established a Military-Revolutionary Council that became the supreme governing institution for the whole region. The Partisans referred to this territory as Drvar Republic.

In the regions of Bosansko Grahovo and Mrkonjić Grad, the influence of the communists was not as strong as in Drvar, and Chetnik representatives like Uroš Drenović neutralized communist attempts to impose their ideology on rebels and consolidate their own forms of government.

== Suppression attempts ==
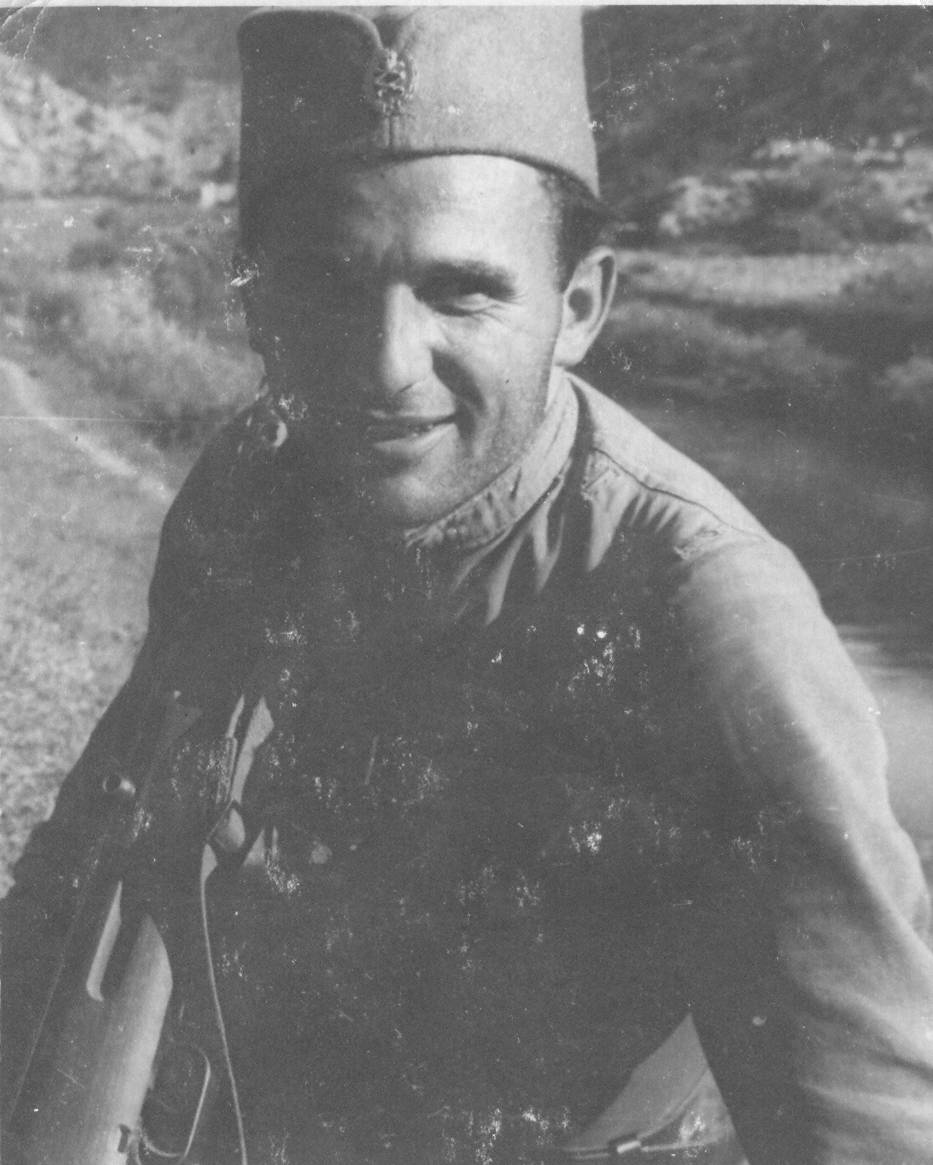
Mane Rokvić

To suppress the uprising, Croatian authorities sent eight battalions and several artillery batteries to Drvar. Both Italian and German intelligence reports concluded that the Drvar uprising had "Communist and Serbian" character and that the main reason for uprising was the Ustaša terror of the Serbian population. The units engaged by Croatian authorities were unable to suppress the uprising. Italy used the uprising to try to expand the territory of NDH under Italian control deeper into Western Bosnia. As the uprising spread from Drvar to other parts of Western Bosnia, the Serb rebels in Banja Luka, Jajce, Prijedor, Livno, Dubica and Sisak were actually supported by Italy, both in politics and in arms. On 26 August 1941, NDH and Italy agreed that the Second Italian Army would occupy and pacify rebels in the second and third zone. Thus, Italy supported Serbian rebels to create an opening to establish its influence beyond the zones they occupied per formal agreements.

Similar to the uprising in Montenegro, the rebels disagreed about their further actions. Nationalist rebels concluded that it was in the best interest of the people to accept integration of the territory into the Italian zone of interest, where they would be protected from Ustaše genocide. The Chetnik leaders wished to save Serbs from their most feared and violent enemy - Ustaše, even if they had temporarily to accept the rule of Italians and Germans. The leaders of rebellion, Mane Rokvić, Vlado Morača and Ilija Desnica, organized a gathering of the people in the village of Zaglavice and, in presence of Italian soldiers, insisted that nobody should attack Italians. The Italians occupied Drvar and the region previously held by rebels on 26 September 1942. The Partisans destroyed the cellulose factory in Drvar before they retreated in front of advancing Italian units in September 1941.

The Communist Party insisted on proceeding with rebellion in order to carry on with the communist revolution. Rebels who disagreed were quickly labeled as traitors and representatives of Greater Serbian bourgeois elements. The communists targeted those who did not support their revolutionary methods and soon executed Ilija Desnica and many other non-communist rebel leaders. The priest Ilija Rodić, one of the initiators of the uprising, was later also killed by communists.

== Aftermath ==
After Italians captured the territory previously held by the rebels, the Chetniks gained the confidence of the local population, especially in central Bosnia and the region of Bosansko Grahovo. The local population organized a gathering on 14 November 1941 in Crni Potoci, and agreed on decisions against communist violence after communists secretly killed Ilija Desnica. To fight against the Chetniks, the communists established the Grmeč Proletarian Company at the beginning of March 1942 in Srpska Jasenica. On 1 April 1942 the communists established the Kozara Shock Anti-Chetnik Battalion by recruiting 400 Partisans selected from the best fighters. In the period of April–May 1942, the communists established another military unit to struggle against Chetniks - Grmeč Anti-Chetnik Battalion, with 800 Partisans ordered to destroy Chetniks of Drenović, Vukašin Marčetić and Lazo Tešanović. The pressure of the Grmeč Anti-Chetnik Battalion forced Uroš Drenović to sign an accord with representatives of the Independent State of Croatia on 25 April 1942.

== Legacy ==
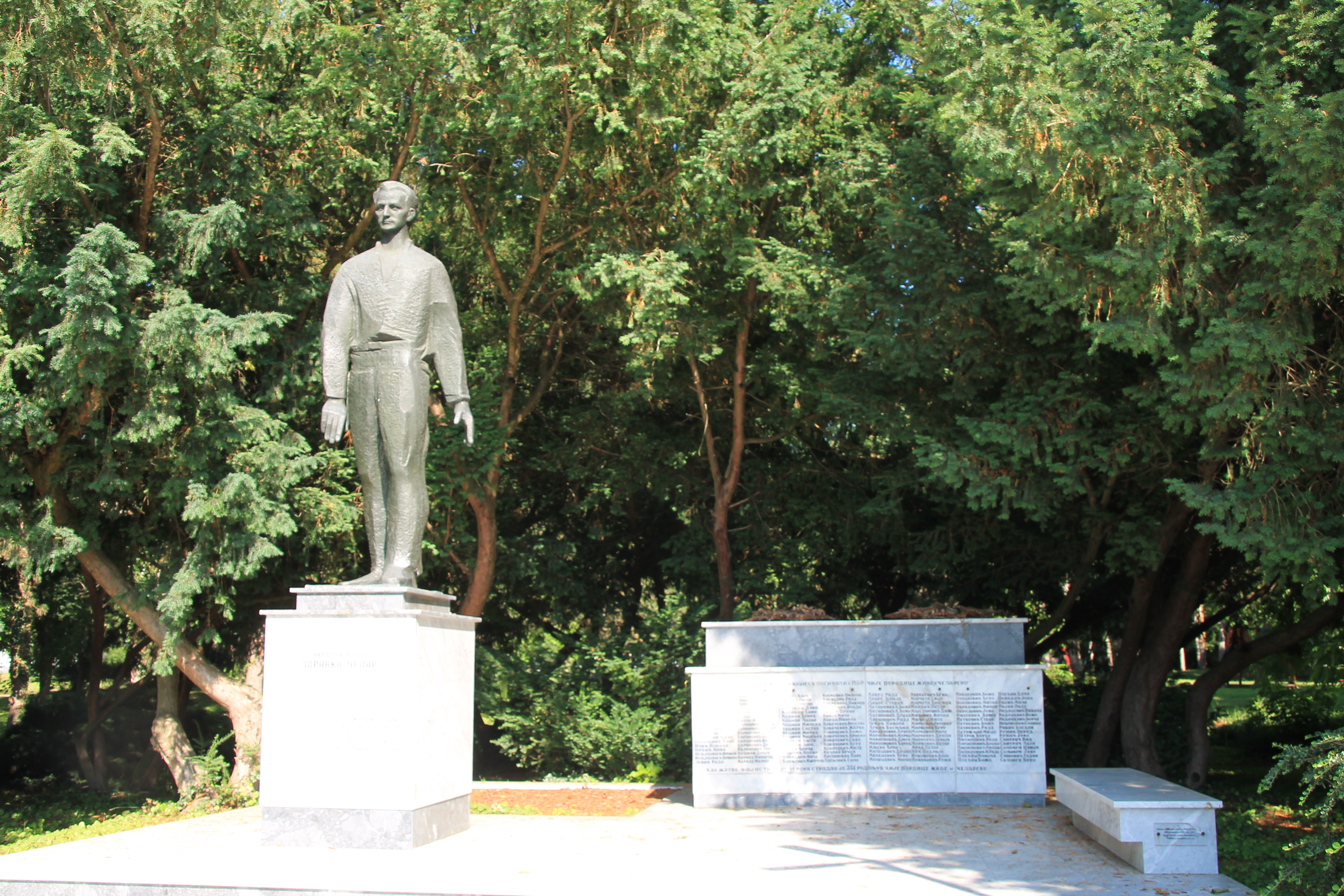
The monument to Zdravko Čelar in Čelarevo, Serbia

In post-war Bosnia and Herzegovina, 27 July was celebrated as public holiday in honor of the uprising of the people of Bosnia and Herzegovina, completely ignoring the much earlier June uprising in eastern Herzegovina. The monument in honor of the uprising in Drvar, constructed by sculptor Marijan Kocković, was erected in Drvar. In 1996 the Croatian Army destroyed the monument designed by Kocković and it was never rebuilt.

In 1988 Božidar Sokolović published a book in honor of Ilija Desnica, one of the leaders of the uprising, titled Ilija Desnica: The Hero from Oštrelj.

== Sources ==
- Antonić, Zdravko, ed. (1973). Hiljadu devet sto četrdeset prva u istoriji naroda Bosne i Hercegovine: Naučni skup, održan u Drvaru od 7. do 9. oktobra 1971. godine [1941 in the History of the Peoples of Bosnia and Herzegovina: Scientific Conference, held in Drvar from October 7–9, 1971] (in Serbo-Croatian). Sarajevo, Yugoslavia: Veselin Masleša. OCLC 318175581.
- Antonić, Zdravko (1990). Istorija Saveza komunista Bosne i Hercegovine [History of the League of Communists of Bosnia and Herzegovina] (in Serbo-Croatian). Sarajevo, Yugoslavia: Institut za istoriju u Sarajevu. OCLC 644345503.
- Bokan, Branko (1972a). Podgrmeč u NOB: Sbornik sjećanja [Podgrmeč in the National Liberation War: A Collection of Memories]. From the War History of our Nation (in Serbo-Croatian). Belgrade, Yugoslavia: Vojnoizdavački Zavod. OCLC 23575220.
- Bokan, Branko (1972b). Podgrmeč u NOB: Jedinstvo fronta i pozadane [Podgrmeč in the National Liberation War: Unity at the Front and the Rear]. From the War History of our Nation (in Serbo-Croatian). Belgrade, Yugoslavia: Vojnoizdavački Zavod. OCLC 644787681.
- Čolaković, Rodoljub (1962). Winning Freedom. translated by Alec Brown. London, UK: Lincolns-Prager. OCLC 53429608.
- Colić, Mladen (1973). Takozvana Nezavisna država Hrvatska 1941 [The so-called Independent State of Croatia in 1941] (in Serbo-Croatian). Belgrade, Yugoslavia: Delta-pres. OCLC 444350883.
- Dedijer, Vladimir (1970) [1942]. Dnevnik [Knjiga 1], [Od 6. aprila 1941 do 27. novembra 1942] [Diary [Book 1] [From 6 April 1941 to 27 November 1942]] (in Serbo-Croatian). Belgrade, Yugoslavia: Prosveta. OCLC 443923160.
- Dedijer, Vladimir (1990). The War Diaries of Vladimir Dedijer: From April 6, 1941, to November 27, 1942. University of Michigan Press. ISBN 978-0-472-10091-0.
- Dedijer, Vladimir; Miletić, Antun (1989). Proterivanje Srba sa ognjišta 1941-1944: svedočanstva [The Expulsion of Serbs from the Hearth 1941–1944: Testimonies] (in Serbo-Croatian). Belgrade, Yugoslavia: Prosveta. ISBN 9788607004508. OCLC 555834246.
- Dizdar, Zdravko (2002). Četnički zločini u Bosni i Hercegovini, 1941–1945 [Chetnik Crimes in Bosnia and Herzegovina, 1941–1945] (in Serbo-Croatian). Zagreb, Croatia: Hrvatski institut za povijest [Croatian Institute of History]. ISBN 978-953-6491-86-5.
- Đuretić, Veselin (1997). Nasilje nad srpskim ustankom: opsene naroda u ime "Rusije i komunizma" [Violence against the Serbian Uprising: Rape of the People in the Name of "Russia and Communism"] (in Serbo-Croatian). Belgrade, Yugoslavia: Institut. ISBN 978-86-7179-024-6.
- Đurović, Milinko, ed. (1964). Ustanak naroda Jugolavije, 1941: zbornik. Pišu učesnici [Uprising of the Peoples of Yugoslavia, 1941: Proceedings]. From the War History of our Nation (in Serbo-Croatian). Belgrade, Yugoslavia: Vojno delo. OCLC 8340708.
- Džomić, Velibor V. (1997). Stradanje Srbske crkve od komunista: Deo 1 [The suffering of the Serbian Church from the Communists: Part 1] (in Serbo-Croatian). Cetinje, Yugoslavia: Svetigora [The publishing house of the Metropolitanate of Montenegro and the Littoral]. OCLC 39683400.
- Godišnjak Društva istoričara Bosne i Hercegovine: Annuaire de la Société historique de Bosnie et Herzégovine [Yearbook of the Society of Historians of Bosnia and Herzegovina] (in Serbo-Croatian). Sarajevo, Yugoslavia: Društvo istoričara Bosne i Hercegovine Society of Historians of Bosnia and Herzegovina. 1973. OCLC 649579693.
- Hoare, Marko Attila (2006). Genocide and Resistance in Hitler's Bosnia: The Partisans and the Chetniks 1941–1943. New York, New York: Oxford University Press. ISBN 978-0-19-726380-8.
- Kadenić, Rahmija; Petković, Radomir (1981). Ratna sećanja iz NOB, 1941–1942 [War Memories from the National Liberation War, 1941–1942] (in Serbo-Croatian). Belgrade, Yugoslavia: Vojnoizdavački zavod. OCLC 314901947.
- Lukač, Dušan (1967). Ustanak u Bosanskoj Krajini [Uprising in the Bosnian Krajina] (in Serbo-Croatian). Belgrade, Yugoslavia: Vojnoizdavački Zavod. OCLC 494388127.
- Milovanović, Milka (2004). Били смо пратиоци воиводе aујића [We were Escorts of the Voivode Đujić] (in Serbo-Croatian). Banja Luka, Bosnia and Herzegovina: Glas Srpski. ISBN 978-99938-37-26-8.
- Milovanović, Nikola B. (1984). Kontrarevolucionarni pokret Draže Mihailovića [The Counter-Revolutionary Movement of Draža Mihailović] (in Serbo-Croatian). Belgrade, Yugoslavia: Izdavačka radna organizacija "Rad". OCLC 11370461.
- Morača, Pero (1972). Drvar 1941-1945: Sjećanja učesnika [Drvar 1941-1945: Memories of Participants] (in Serbo-Croatian). Drvar, Yugoslavia: Skupština opštine. OCLC 443689688.
- Nikolić, Kosta (2009). Италијанска војска и четници у другом светском рату у Југославији, 1941–1943 [The Italian Army and the Chetniks in World War II in Yugoslavia, 1941–1943] (in Serbo-Croatian). Belgrade, Serbia: Institute for Contemporary History. ISBN 978-86-7403-130-8.
- Petranović, Branko (1981). Istorija Jugoslavije: 1918-1978 [The History of Yugoslavia: 1918–1978] (in Serbo-Croatian). Belgrade, Yugoslavia: Nolit. OCLC 890476590.
- Plećaš, Neđeljko B. (1983). Ratne godine, 1941–1945 [War Years, 1941–1945] (in Serbo-Croatian). Columbus, Ohio: Kosovo Publishing Company. OCLC 10425957.
- Plećaš, Neđeljko B. (2004). Ratne godine [War Years]. with Bojan Dimitrijević. Belgrade, Serbia and Montenegro: Institut za savremenu istoriju [Institute for Contemporary History]. ISBN 978-86-7403-091-2.
- Redžić, Enver (2005). Bosnia and Herzegovina in the Second World War. Abingdon-on-Thames, UK: Frank Cass. ISBN 978-0-7146-5625-0.
- Runić, Dušica (29 July 2019). "Rat spomenicima u Ustaničkom Drvaru Partizani gube bitku u Titovom gradu heroju" [Partisans lose the battle over Monuments of the Drvar Uprising in Tito's Hero City]. impulsportal.net (in Serbo-Croatian).
- Sokolovic, Bozidar (1988). Ilija Desnica: Junak Sa Ostrelja [Ilija Desnica: Hero of Oštrelj] (in Serbo-Croatian). Milwaukee, Wisconsin: Nevin Publishing. OCLC 1124573389.
- Terzić, Velimir (1957). Oslobodilacki rat naroda Jugoslavije 1941-1945 [The Liberation War of the Peoples of Yugoslavia 1941–1945] (in Serbo-Croatian). Belgrade, Yugoslavia: Vojnoistoriski Institut Jugoslovenske narodne armije. OCLC 28601608.
- Tomasevich, Jozo (1975). War and Revolution in Yugoslavia, 1941–1945: The Chetniks. Stanford, California: Stanford University Press. ISBN 978-0-8047-0857-9.
- Tomasevich, Jozo (2001). War and Revolution in Yugoslavia, 1941–1945: Occupation and Collaboration. Vol. 2. San Francisco: Stanford University Press. ISBN 978-0-8047-3615-2.
- Vignjević, Milorad (1978). Kozara u narodnooslobodilačkom ratu: Zapisi i sjećanja. Sjećanja prikupio Milorad Vignjević [Kozara in the Liberation War: Records and Memories. Memories collected by Milorad Vignjević] (in Serbo-Croatian). Belgrade, Yugoslavia: Vojnoizdavački Zavod. OCLC 568036754.
- Vučković, Zvonimir (2001). Ravnogorska istorijska čitanka: povest nacionalnog pokreta otpora u II svetskom ratu kroz dela učesnika i svedoka : jubilarno izdanje povodom šezdesetgodišnjice, 1941-2001 [The Ravna Gora Historical Reader: The Story of the National Resistance Movement in World War II through the Works of Participants and Witnesses: Jubilee Edition on the Occasion of the Sixtieth Anniversary, 1941-2001] (in Serbo-Croatian). with Uglješa Krstić et al. Belgrade, Yugoslavia: Bajat. OCLC 55846456.
- Vujnović, Stevo (1986). Vojna organizacija jugoslovenske revulucije [Yugoslav Revolutionary Military Organization]. Belgrade, Yugoslavia: Partizanska knjiga. OCLC 22649674.
