= Trubar =

Trubar may refer to:

- Trubar, Bihać, a village in Bihać municipality, Bosnia and Herzegovina
- Trubar massacre, a civilian massacre committed by Chetniks on 27 July 1941
- Primož Trubar (1508–1586), Protestant reformer
