= Juraj Gospodnetić =

The Reverend Juraj Gospodnetić
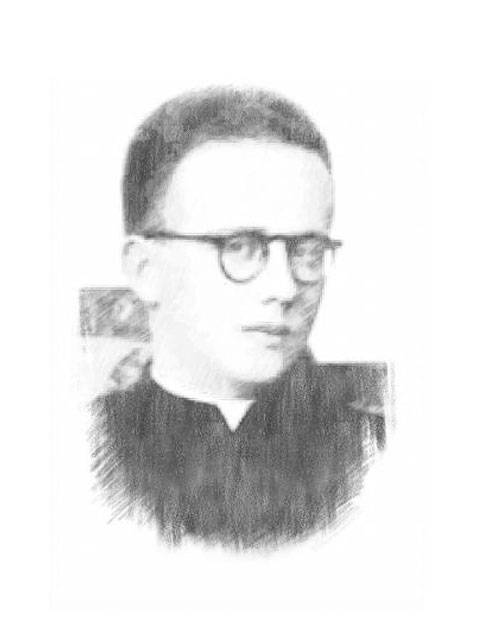
- Born: 9 January 1910; Postire, Kingdom of Dalmatia (present Croatia)
- Died: 27 July 1941 (aged 31); Bosansko Grahovo, Independent State of Croatia (present Bosnia and Herzegovina
- Cause of death: Murder
- Occupation: Priest

Ecclesiastical career
- Church: Catholic Church

Juraj Gospodnetić (9 January 1910 – 27 July 1941) was a Croatian Catholic priest who was tortured and murdered by Chetniks during the Bosansko Grahovo massacre. The Holy See started the process of beatification of Gospodnetić on 21 December 2014 as well as the process of beatification of the other three priests of the Diocese of Banja Luka murdered in the massacres during the Second World War, Waldemar Maximilian Nestor, Antun Dujlović and Krešimir Barišić.

== Life ==
Juraj Gospodnetić was born in Postira on the island of Brač. After graduating from elementary school in his hometown, his secondary school education was continued in Šibenik. He began his theological studies in Split and finished in Zagreb. As a deacon he was ordained on 10 April 1938 and as a priest in Zagreb on 26 June 1938. In 1939 he was appointed as parish priest of Bosansko Grahovo. During the Partisan-Chetnik uprising in western Bosnia on 27 July 1941, a group of Chetniks tortured and killed Gospodnetić as well as about 250 Catholics from the parish of Bosansko Grahovo.
