= Mane Rokvić =

Serbian partisan and Chetnik commander

- Мане Роквић
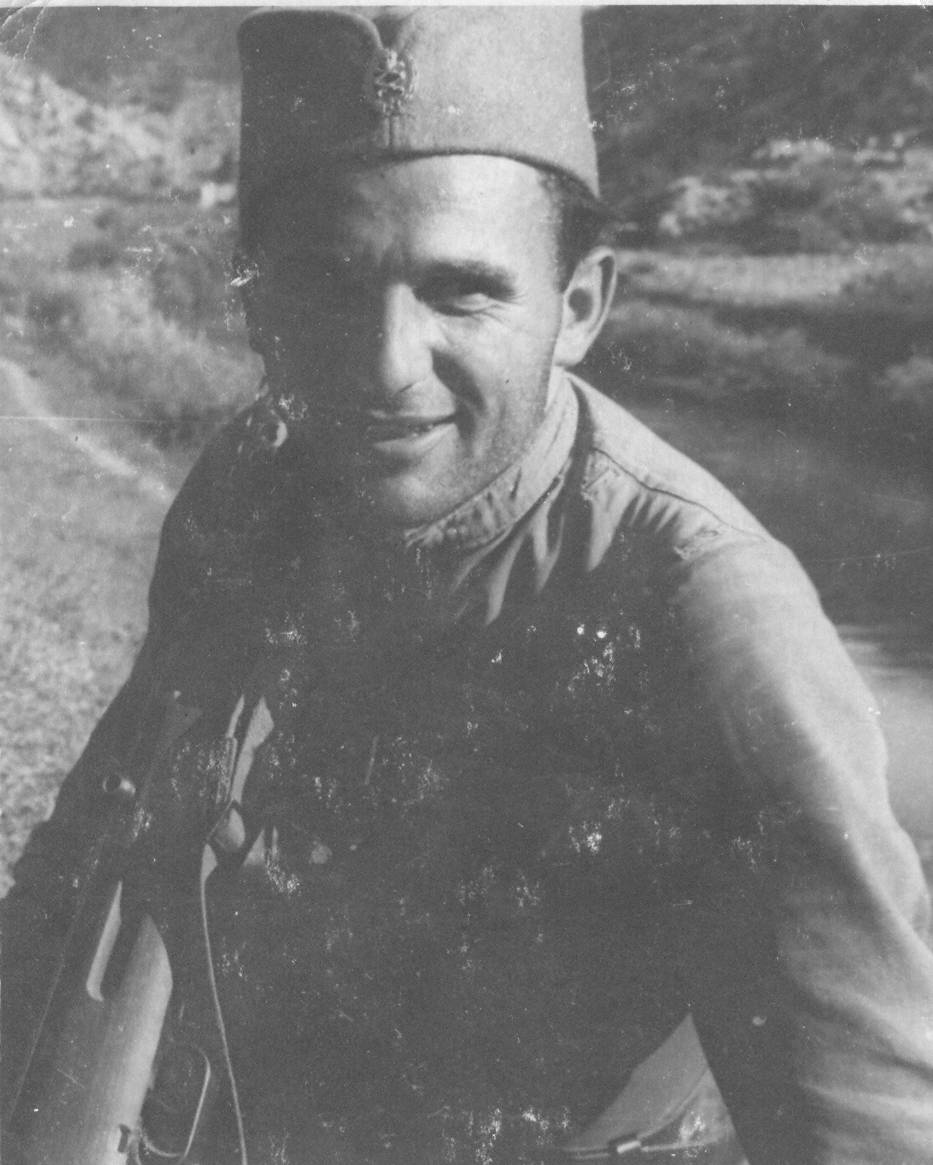
- Mane Rokvić as a Chetnik commander
- Born: Date Unknown
- Died: 1944
- Military career
- Allegiance: Communist Party of Yugoslavia; Kingdom of Yugoslavia; (Chetniks) Dinara Chetnik Division
- Service years: 1941–1944
- Rank: Vojvoda
- Battles: Drvar uprising
- Awards: Order of the Star of Karađorđe

Mane Rokvić (Serbian Cyrillic: Мане Роквић) was a Serb guerrilla commander and collaborator with the Axis occupation forces during the Second World War. Rokvić briefly became commander of the Yugoslav Partisan 4th detachment of the Sloboda Battalion during the 1941 Drvar uprising, a spontaneous resistance by the Serbian population to the genocidal activities of the Independent State of Croatia in Western Bosnia. Later and most notably, Rokvić left the communist cause to join the royalist Dinara Chetnik Division to command the King Alexander I regiment. He went on to collaborate with the Germans to fight against the Yugoslav Partisans.

== Early life ==
Rokvić was born in Kolunić near Bosanski Petrovac, in modern-day Bosnia and Herzegovina. Prior to the Second World War, Rokvić was employed as a mechanic in the Šipad lumber and furniture factory in Drvar. He joined the Yugoslav Communist Party in 1929.

== World War II ==
As commander of the Medeno Polje based 4th detachment of Sloboda Battalion, Rokvić is credited with successfully attacking Croatian fascist ustaše forces in Pasjak near Drvar on 26 July 1941. With the momentum of victory, Rokvić's detachment subsequently liberated the towns of Drvar, Bosansko Grahovo and village of Oštrelj with three other Partisan detachments in what is known as the Drvar uprising.

Following the Drvar uprising, Rokvić broke ranks with the communist Partisans and joined the royalist Serbian Chetnik cause after learning that Yugoslav Partisans under instructions of Croatian communists razed Serbian homes in Drvar prior to Italian occupation forces arriving.

Upon joining the Serbian royalist cause in the fall of 1941, Rokvić stood up the King Alexander I regiment, one of six regiments that would later form the Dinara Chetnik Division led by Serbian Orthodox priest, turned guerrilla, Vojvoda Momčilo Đujić.

As commander of the King Aleksandar I regiment, which for certain time was garrisoned in Drvar, Rokvić along with the commander of the Gavrilo Princip regiment Branko Bogunović, was promoted to the rank of vojvoda by Chetnik veteran organizer Ilija Trifunović Birčanin.

Earlier that year, Rokvić was decorated by president of the Yugoslav government-in-exile Slobodan Jovanović with the Karađorđe's Star.

In September 1943, Rokvić concluded a collaboration agreement with the German-led 373rd (Croatian) Infantry Division at a time when Rokvić had a 260-strong group, and was in control of an area which included parts of both western Bosnia and Lika. The division utilised the Chetniks to protect railway lines and key industries in their area, as well as for scouting against the Partisans and attacks on the rear of Partisan formations.

After the Italian capitulation at the end of 1943, 600 Chetnik fighters under the command of Rokvić operated in the southwestern part of the Bosnian Krajina along the Bosansko Grahovo-Drvar-Bosanski Petrovac-Bihać corridor.

It is believed that at the end of 1944, Rokvić withdrew his forces towards Slovenia where it is believed that he was captured and subsequently murdered by the Croatian Ustaše.

== Sources ==
- Plećaš, Neđeljko; Dimitrijević, Bojan (2004). Ratne godine [War Years]. Institut za savremenu istoriju. ISBN 9788674030912.
- Plećaš, Neđeljko B. (1983). Ratne godine, 1941-1945 [War Years, 1941-1945]. Kosovo Publishing Company.
- Kadenić, Rahmija; Petković, Radomir (1981). Ratna sećanja iz NOB, 1941-1942 [War Memories from NOB, 1941-1942]. Vojnoizdavački zavod.
- Redžić, Enver (1998). Bosna i Hercegovina u Drugom svjetskom ratu [Bosnia and Herzegovina in the Second World War]. OKO. ISBN 978-9958-43-030-5.
- Šešelj, Vojislav (1992). Razaranja srpskog nacionalnog bića [Destruction of Serbian national identity]. ABC Glas.
- Tomasevich, Jozo (1975). War and Revolution in Yugoslavia, 1941–1945: The Chetniks. Stanford, California: Stanford University Press. ISBN 978-0-8047-0857-9.
- Tomasevich, Jozo (2001). War and Revolution in Yugoslavia, 1941–1945: Occupation and Collaboration. Stanford, California: Stanford University Press. ISBN 978-0-8047-3615-2.
- Ćopić, Branko (1966). Prolom: roman [Breakthrough]. Prosveta.
- Milovanović, Nikola B. (1984). Kontrarevolucionarni pokret Draže Mihailovića: Rasulo. Slom. Odmetništvo. Emigracija [Draža Mihailović's counter-revolutionary movement]. Izdavačka radna organizacija "Rad".
- Dedijer, Vladimir (1946). Dnevnik: Svedočanstva iz oslobodilačkog rata. (Od 28 Novembra 1942 do 10 Novembra 1943) [Diary: Testimonies from the Liberation War. (From November 28, 1942 to November 10, 1943)]. Drzavni izd. zavod Jugoslavije.
- Dizdar, Zdravko (2002). Četnički zločini u Bosni i Hercegovini, 1941.-1945 [Chetnik Crimes in Bosnia and Herzegovina, 1941-1945]. Hrvatski institut za povijest. ISBN 978-953-6491-86-5.
- Plećaš-Nitonja, Nikola (1975). Požar u Krajini [Fire in Krajina]. Plećaš-Nitonja.
- Redžić, Enver (2005). Bosnia and Herzegovina in the Second World War. Psychology Press. ISBN 978-0-7146-5625-0.
