= Bosansko Grahovo massacre =

1941 killings of Croat civilians

- Location: 44°10′48″N 16°21′36″E; Bosansko Grahovo, Bosnia and Herzegovina
- Date: 27 July 1941
- Target: Croat civilians
- Attack type: War crime
- Deaths: Around 100
- Perpetrator: Chetniks

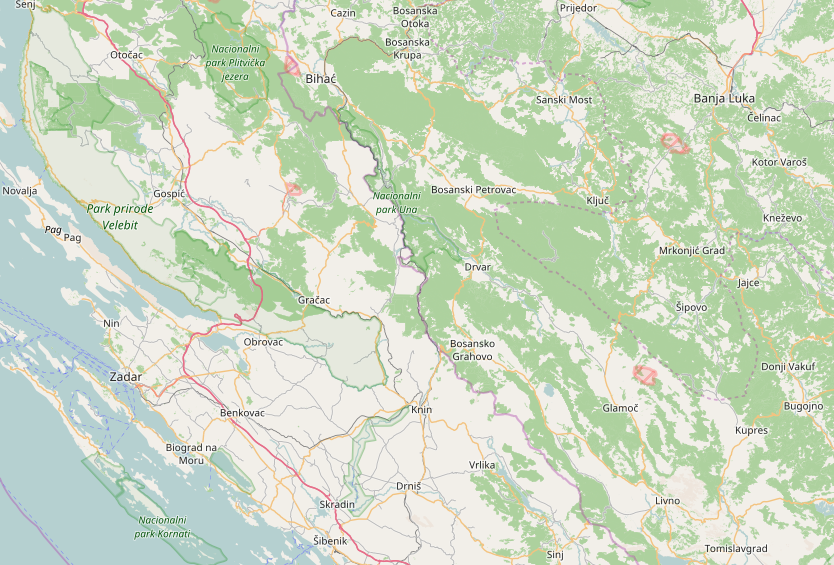
Locations of massacres in summer 1941

The Bosansko Grahovo massacre was a massacre of Croat civilians was committed by local Chetnik rebels on 27 July 1941 in the village of Bosansko Grahovo.

== Background ==
On 27 July 1941, a Yugoslav Partisan-led uprising began in the area of Dvar and Bosansko Grahovo (Drvar uprising). It was a coordinated effort from both sides of the Una River in the territory of southeastern Lika and southwestern Bosanska. It succeeded in transferring key NDH territory under rebel control.

== Incident ==
On the same day the Trubar massacre occurred, Chetniks and other affiliated Serb rebels, commanded by Branko Bogunović, attacked Croat civilians in Bosansko Grahovo and surrounding villages, killing about 100, of whom 62 were identified. Among those killed were at least 5 women and 9 children. Numerous homes were burned, along with the Catholic church and rectory in Grahovo. A parish priest, Juraj Gospodnetić, was tortured and killed.

== See also ==
- Pogrom in Krnjeuša
- Srb uprising
- Trubar massacre
