= Krnjeuša massacre =

Coordinates: 44.69°N 16.23°E

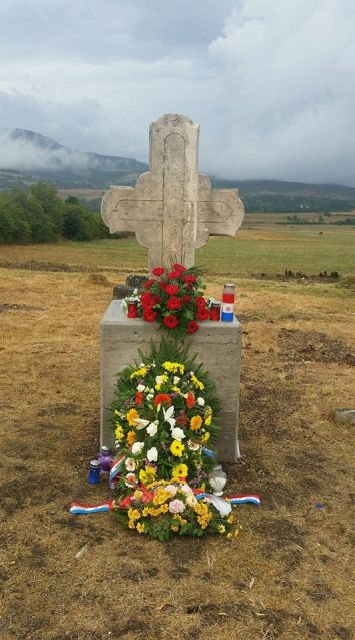
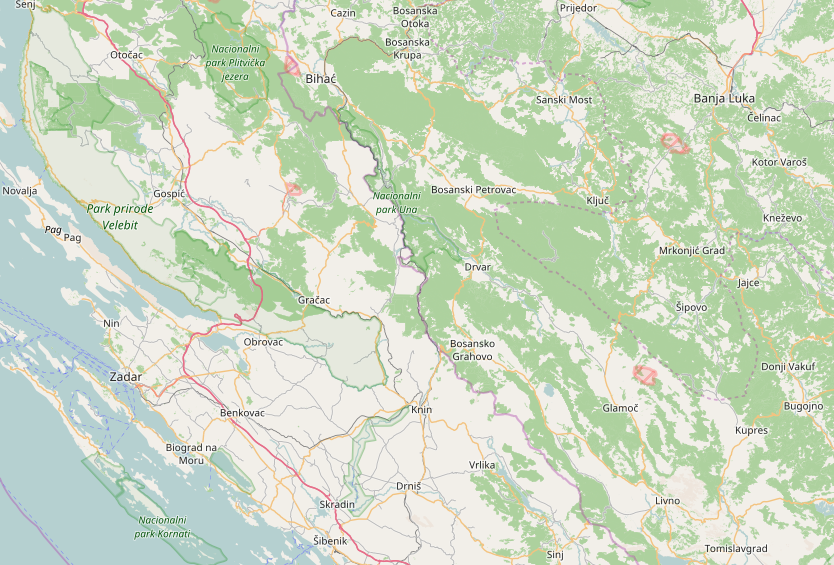
- Memorial cross in Krnjeuša Locations of massacres in summer 1941
- Location: Krnjeuša, Bosnia and Herzegovina
- Date: August 9, 1941
- Target: Croatian Catholic civilians
- Attack type: Mass killing, ethnic cleansing
- Deaths: 240 (identified)
- Perpetrator: Chetniks led by Mane Rokvić

A massacre of Croat civilians was committed by local Serb rebels led by Mane Rokvić on August 9-10, 1941, during the Drvar uprising.

The rebels were primarily Chetniks. The manner in which the massacre was committed suggests it was done in retaliation for earlier massacres committed by the Ustaša. In particular, between July 30 and August 8, 3 to 4 thousand Serbs were killed by the Ustaša in the neighbouring Slunj district.

The Roman Catholic parish of Krnjeuša, established as Parish of Zelinovac in 1892, was a parish of the Diocese of Banja Luka which encompassed 10 settlements (Krnjeuša, lastve, Vranovina, Risovac, Vođenica, Vrtoče, Bjelaj, Teočak, Prkose and Cimeše) in the area near to Bosanski Petrovac numbering around 1,300 believers.

The massacre, which started on August 9, 1941, caused the total destruction of the parish. The church, the rectory and majority of houses in parish was burned and demolished. So far, the identity of 240 killed civilians is known including a 34-year-old parish priest, Krešimir Barišić, who was tortured and burned alive. Among those killed were 72 women and 49 children under the age of 12. After the massacre the local Croats fled and the communist authorities refused to allow exiles to return after the war ended in 1945.

== See also ==
- Trubar massacre
- Bosansko Grahovo massacre
- Roman Catholic Diocese of Banja Luka

== Sources ==
- Anto Orlovac: Hommage uništenom zavičaju, članak iz Hrvatskog slova od 6. travnja 2007., str. 22.
- Ana Došen: Krnjeuša u srcu i sjećanju, Matica hrvatska, ogranak Rijeka, Rijeka, 1994; ISBN 953-6035-01-4
- Ana Došen: To je bilo onda, Vlastita naklada, Zagreb, 2007; ISBN 953-95354-0-9
- Josip Jurjević: Pogrom u Krnjeuši 9. i 10. kolovoza 1941.', Vikarijat Banjalučke biskupije, Zagreb, 1999; ISBN 953-97841-0-7
