= Uroš Drenović =

Bosnian Serb military commander (1911–1944)

Vojvoda Uroš Drenović
- Урош Дреновић
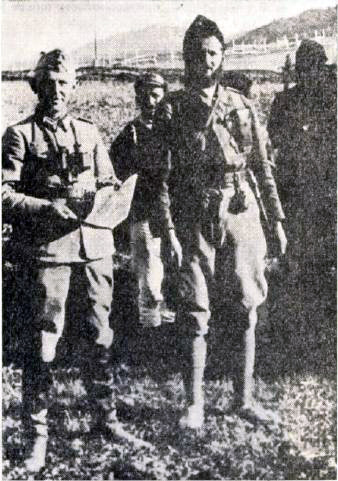
- Drenović (right), alongside a German officer
- Born: 1911; Sitnica, Condominium of Bosnia and Herzegovina, Austria-Hungary
- Died: 29 May 1944 (aged 33); Banja Luka, Independent State of Croatia
- Burial place: Klisina, Stričići
- Military career
- Allegiance: Yugoslav Partisans (1941); Chetniks (1941–1944); Nazi Germany (1942–1944); Independent State of Croatia (1942–1944)
- Commands: 3rd "Petar Kočić" Battalion; "Petar Kočić" Chetnik Detachment
- Conflicts: World War II in Yugoslavia
- Awards: Order of Karađorđe's Star

Uroš Drenović (Serbian Cyrillic: Урош Дреновић; 1911 – 29 May 1944) was a Bosnian Serb military commander in the central Bosnia region of the fascist puppet state known as the Independent State of Croatia (NDH), led by the Ustaše, during World War II. After distinguishing himself in resisting the Ustaše alongside communist-led rebels, Drenović betrayed the communist-led Partisans and began to collaborate with the Ustaše, Italians and Germans against them.

Following the German-led invasion of Yugoslavia in April 1941, the Ustaše implemented genocidal policies against the NDH's Serbs, Jews and Roma. Drenović joined the Partisans and distinguished himself during the initial uprising against the NDH government by capturing the town of Mrkonjić Grad in August 1941. He was then appointed to command the 3rd "Petar Kočić" Battalion in central Bosnia and was appointed the deputy commander of the 3rd Krajina Detachment. A Serbian nationalist with anti-Muslim and anti-Croat views, Drenović eventually betrayed the Partisans and sided with the royalist, Serbian nationalist Chetniks, whose ideology more closely matched his own. In April 1942, Drenović fled to Banja Luka after his units were defeated by the Partisans. There, out of military and political necessity, he concluded an alliance with the NDH against the Partisans. Drenović later began collaborating with the Italians and Germans against the Partisans and continued to do so until his death in an Allied bombing raid on Banja Luka in May 1944.

Despite his extensive collaboration with the Axis, a Banja Luka street is named after him, and within Republika Srpska, the Serb-majority entity of Bosnia and Herzegovina, the actions of his Chetniks are celebrated and equated with those of the Partisans. The celebration and rehabilitation of Chetniks such as Drenović has been criticised by the civil society organisation the Helsinki Committee for Human Rights as reflecting a “deeply ill society”.

== Early life ==
Uroš Drenović was born in 1911 in Sitnica, near Mount Manjača in the Condominium of Bosnia and Herzegovina, Austria-Hungary. He attended school in Mrkonjić Grad and finished teachers' college in Sarajevo. After graduation he became a schoolmaster at Baraći, near Banja Luka, in the Bosanska Krajina region of Bosnia in what had become the Kingdom of Yugoslavia. Prior to the outbreak of World War II, he attended the Royal Yugoslav Army (Serbo-Croatian: Vojska Kraljevine Jugoslavije, VKJ) reserve officer training school at Bileća, and was serving in the VKJ reserve.

== World War II ==
=== Bosanska Krajina uprising ===
After their invasion of Yugoslavia in April 1941, the Germans created an Axis puppet state called the Independent State of Croatia (Serbo-Croatian: Nezavisna Država Hrvatska, NDH), governed by the Ustaše. Shortly after its creation, largely spontaneous uprisings began to occur throughout the state, caused by the genocidal policies implemented by the Ustaše against Serbs, Jews and Roma.

On 4 July, in the wake of the Axis invasion of the Soviet Union, the Communist Party of Yugoslavia (Serbo-Croatian: Komunistička partija Jugoslavije, KPJ) decided to launch a general uprising against the occupying forces across Yugoslavia, in solidarity with the Soviets, and a full-scale rebellion broke out in Bosnia on 27 July. This included local uprisings in the Bosanska Krajina, which spread across the NDH, but the KPJ organisation was initially swept along in the popular uprisings rather than leading the rebellion.

On 29 August, Drenović distinguished himself by planning and leading the capture of Mrkonjić Grad by the rebels, but when the town was recaptured by NDH forces four days later, the KPJ blamed him and his troops, citing their poor discipline and anti-Muslim chauvinism. In September, four battalions of fighters were formed in the Ribnik, Janj and Pliva region. One of these, the 3rd "Petar Kočić" Battalion, was commanded by Drenović who, unlike the other battalion commanders in the region, did not allow the KPJ to appoint political commissars to his companies. Mrkonjić Grad did not have a strong KPJ presence, but was under the sway of the sectarian Serb elite, allowing Drenović to arrest Muslim communists, even confronting senior members of the Partisan leadership in the Bosanska Krajina.

On 26 September 1941 at the Partisan conference in Stolice in the German-occupied territory of Serbia, the leadership decided to standardise its military organisation across occupied Yugoslavia. During October and November, three detachments were formed in the Bosanska Krajina from existing units such as the 3rd "Petar Kočić" Battalion, and Drenović was appointed as deputy commander of the 3rd Krajina Detachment responsible for operations in the territory of central Bosnia. The Serbs of this region had strong pro-Chetnik/Serb-chauvinist sympathies. The Chetniks were a loosely-organised Serb-chauvinist guerrilla movement putatively led by Draža Mihailović. Of the 34 companies in the detachment, only 13 had KPJ organisations, only 11 had commanders who were members of the KPJ, and only 18 had a political commissar. Many KPJ activists in the region were Muslims or Croats, not easily accepted by the mass of the rank-and-file who were largely Serb-chauvinist peasants. Drenović himself was the leading exponent of Chetnik ideology in central Bosnia. This narrow ideology involved extreme Serbian nationalism, and irredentism focussed on the creation of a Greater Serbia, and was anti-Croat, anti-Muslim, monarchist, and anti-communist. Drenović himself despised Muslims and Croats but was "diplomatic enough to keep his feelings in check when necessary". In October, the leadership of the 3rd Krajina Detachment attempted to win over the Muslim village of Crljeni by gaining the agreement of the headman to contribute five armed men to the detachment. When the headman reneged on the deal, the bulk of the detachment attacked the village, and the remainder of the detachment had to prevent Drenović's men from burning and looting it.

On 26 November 1941, at a meeting of the leadership of the 3rd Krajina Detachment, Drenović advocated collaboration with the Italian occupation forces on the basis that the Italians were protecting Serbs from the Ustaše. This was rejected by the senior KPJ members of the detachment, but they were not in a position to force him to abandon the idea. At the same meeting, Drenović refused to commit the 3rd "Petar Kočić" Battalion to fight the Italians. Under pressure, he agreed to advise neighbouring battalions if the Italians moved through his territory. In return, the leadership of the 3rd Krajina Detachment agreed that Drenović could refer to his force as a "Military-Chetnik Detachment". On 10 December, the senior KPJ members of the 3rd Krajina Detachment concluded that 50 percent of their command staff did not support the leading role of the KPJ in the uprising. The Partisan leadership for Bosanska Krajina later observed that the leaders of the 3rd Krajina Detachment had made no effort to remove Chetnik elements from its ranks or stop their Serb-chauvinist agitation.

In early February 1942, Drenović took a leading role in a conference intended to bring the 7th Glamoč Battalion, which had declared itself as "Chetnik", back into the Partisan structure. Drenović argued for the Chetnik side, and was expelled from the meeting along with his supporters, and the 7th Glamoč Battalion returned to the Partisan fold. On 6 February, a meeting of the leaders of the 1st, 2nd and 4th Battalions of the 3rd Krajina Detachment met and decided to bring Drenović back into the Partisan movement by organising an attack on the Italian and Ustaše garrison of Mrkonjić Grad. Under pressure from his own rank-and-file, Drenović formally participated in the attack, but he was able to prevent its success through allowing the Italians to move past his battalion and attack the Partisan rear. According to Partisan sources, he forewarned the Italians and Ustaše, and divulged the Partisan plan to them.

=== Alliance with the NDH ===
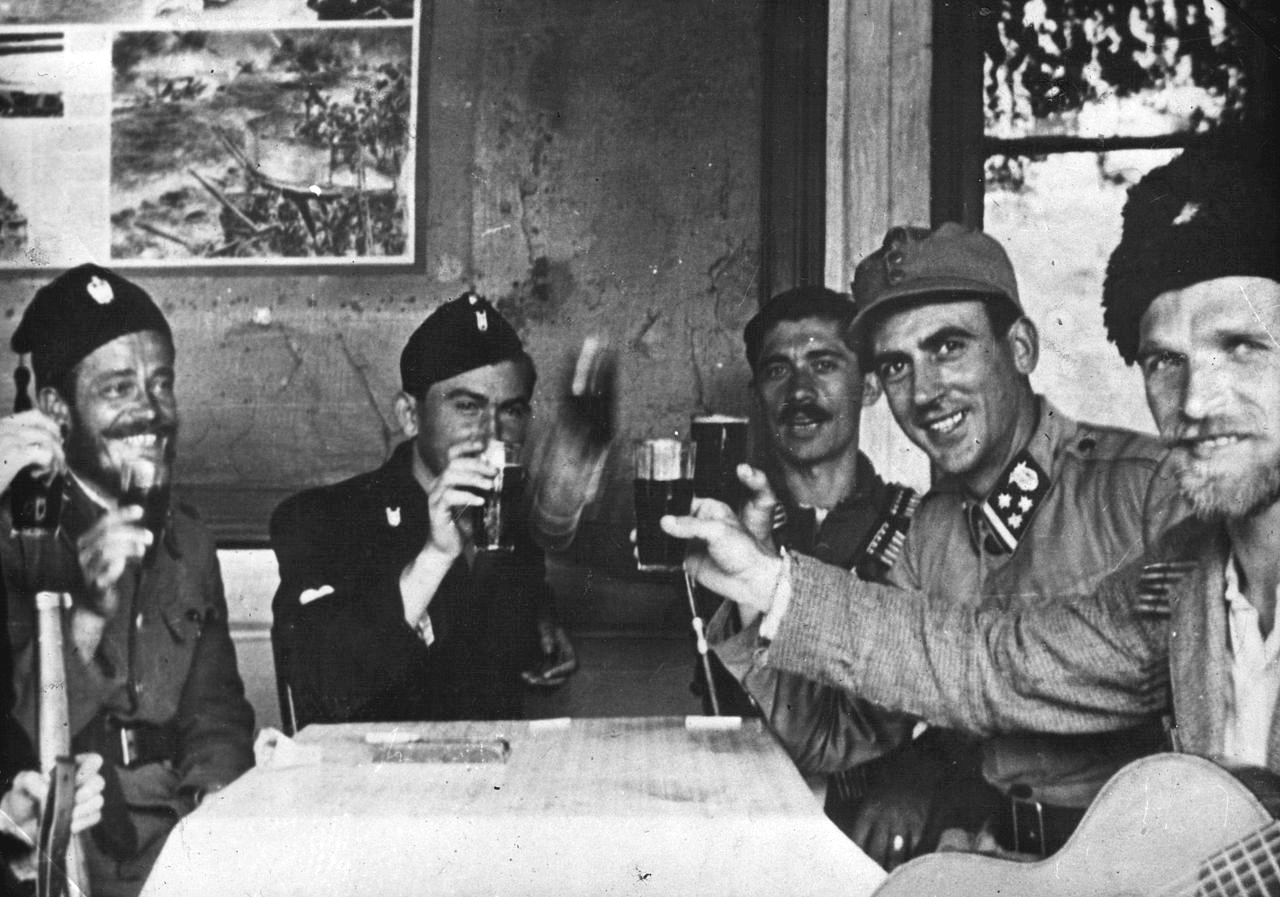
Drenović (far left) drinking with Croatian Home Guard and Ustaše troops

In response to highly effective pro-Chetnik agitation from within, many Partisan units defected to the Chetniks. In the second half of April 1942, the Partisans responded with aggressive military action against the defectors. The unit that led this offensive was the Grmeč Shock Anti-Chetnik Battalion, formed earlier that month from wholly loyal and reliable troops. This offensive spelt the end of Drenović's "Petar Kočić" Chetnik Detachment, and Drenović took refuge with the Ustaše in Mrkonjić Grad. On 27 April, he and other defeated Chetnik commanders signed an agreement with the NDH. The agreement had eight points, which included requiring that hostilities between the Ustaše and Drenović's Chetniks come to an end, that the NDH forces protect Serb villages from the Partisans, and that the Ustaše units assist the Chetniks in fighting the Partisans. The agreement also required the Ustaše to restore religious and civil rights to Serbs of the Krajina. In turn, Drenović issued a declaration in which he recognised the sovereignty of the NDH. Historian Enver Redžić argues the agreement was reached out of military and political necessity. He writes:

The Ustaše–Chetnik accords were driven neither by a confluence of Serbian and Croatian national interests nor by mutual desire for acceptance and respect, but rather because each side needed to obstruct Partisan advances. The Ustaše and Chetniks, two long-time foes, sought help from one another at a time when the Ustaše were facing national political disgrace among the Croats and the Chetniks were losing the support of the Serbs.

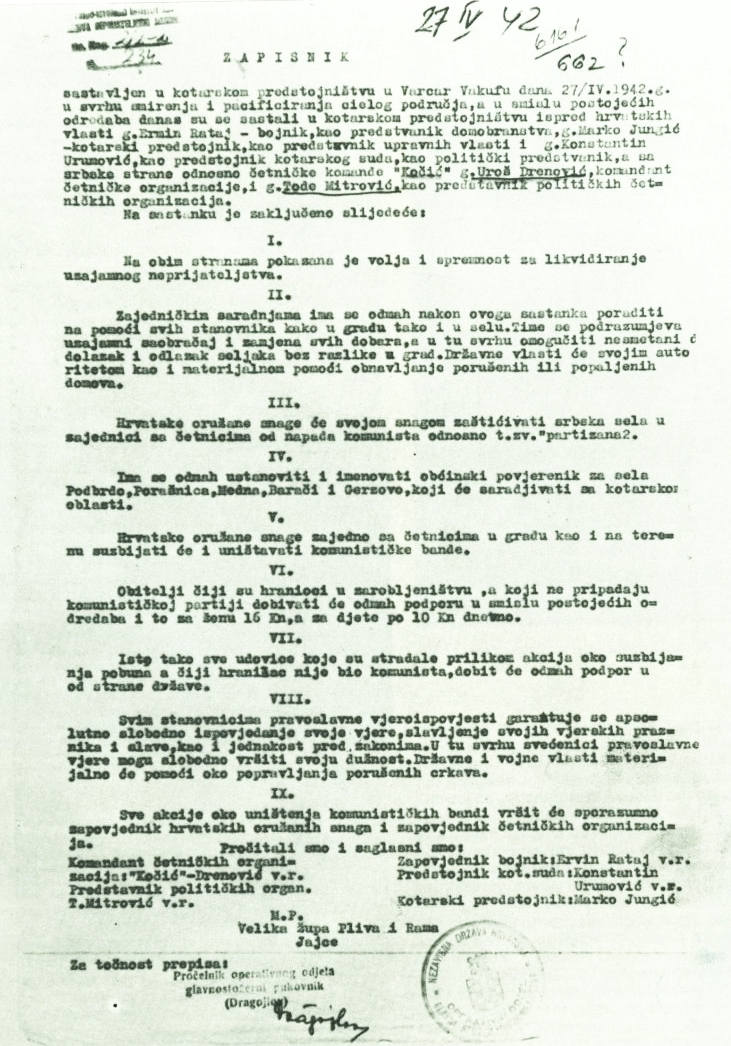
The written agreement between the Ustaše and Drenović's Chetniks

The NDH authorities considered that the alliance would also mean that the Chetniks could continue to subvert Partisan units. On 30 April, the NDH authorities recognised the rights of Drenović and his troops to remain armed in order to fight the Partisans. The agreement between the NDH and Drenović's Chetniks was soon made public by the Ustaše press; Serb public opinion remained divided. By May, Drenović had a force of about 350 Chetniks. Around mid-month, he signed an agreement with a Croatian general staff officer in Banja Luka agreeing to cooperate with the NDH in fighting the Partisans.

Drenović soon emerged as one of the most important Chetnik leaders in western Bosnia. That summer, when order had been established in significant parts of the Italian occupation zone, Drenović and other Chetnik detachment leaders and their principal political spokesmen with Italian Second Army headquarters were recognised by the Italians as auxiliaries. Early in the summer the Second Army commander, Generale designato d'armata (acting General) Mario Roatta, allowed for the delivery of arms, munitions, and supplies to the Chetniks. Other Chetnik leaders in Bosnia who had concluded alliances with the NDH by June 1942 included Mane Rokvić, Branko Bogunović, Stevo Rađenović and Momčilo Đujić. Political scientist Sabrina P. Ramet observed that the cooperation with the NDH must be seen as a function of their mutual fear of the Partisans and emphasises the uncertainty and distrust that accompanied it. By June, Drenović's Chetniks numbered about 600 men.

Two thousand Bosnian Chetniks, under the command of Vukašin Marčetić and Drenović, participated in a large German-led anti-Partisan Kozara Offensive in June and July 1942, during which the Chetniks fought alongside NDH troops.

In 1943, Drenović was awarded the Order of Karađorđe's Star by the exiled King Peter, based on a recommendation by Mihailović. Following the Italian capitulation in September 1943, Drenović agreed to the close cooperation of his Chetniks with local German units and was informed at the end of the year that Ustaše units would again be stationed in Serb-inhabited areas. In October 1943, a team from the German Brandenburg Division under Oberleutnant Hermann Kirchner began working alongside Drenović's Chetniks in northwest Bosnia, operating forward reconnaissance groups and developing contact with anti-communist farmers to keep an eye on Partisan troop movements. There were about 950 Chetniks serving under Drenović that year, positioned around Manjača and Glamoč. Drenović had about 400 Chetniks under his command by the following year. Drenović was a Chetnik vojvoda (warlord), and his Chetnik band was the only one that the Ustaše trusted fully during the war.

=== Death and legacy ===
On 29 May 1944, Drenović was killed in an Allied bombing raid on Banja Luka. His grave is located next to the Serbian Orthodox Church of Klisina, in Stričići, outside Banja Luka. The Ravna Gora Movement, which is a modern-day Serbian nationalist Chetnik organisation, and the Klisina church organise a ceremony each year to commemorate Drenović's actions in 1941. A street in Banja Luka bears his name.

Despite the extensive evidence of his collaboration with the Ustaše, Italians and Germans, Drenović's actions and those of his Chetniks are celebrated in the official history of World War II used within Republika Srpska, the Serb entity within Bosnia and Herzegovina. Schools in Republika Srpska teach that the Chetniks were on the same anti-fascist footing as the Partisans. According to Branko Todorović from the Helsinki Committee for Human Rights in Republika Srpska, this is consistent with the post-communist ideology of the early 1990s which sought to rehabilitate World War II nationalist movements on all sides to justify revenge for past crimes and drive national homogeneity. Todorović opined that "if the future of the region lies in the celebration and glorification of Ustaše and Chetnik crimes and criminals then we are a really deeply ill society on a completely wrong path." (Note: "Ako je budućnost regiona u reinkarnaciji ustaško četničkih zločina i zločinaca i njihovom slavljenju i glorifikaciji, onda smo mi zaista duboko oboljelo društvo na potpuno pogrešnom putu".)
