= Trubar massacre =

Civilian massacre committed by Chetniks on 27 July 1941

- Part of World War II in Yugoslavia
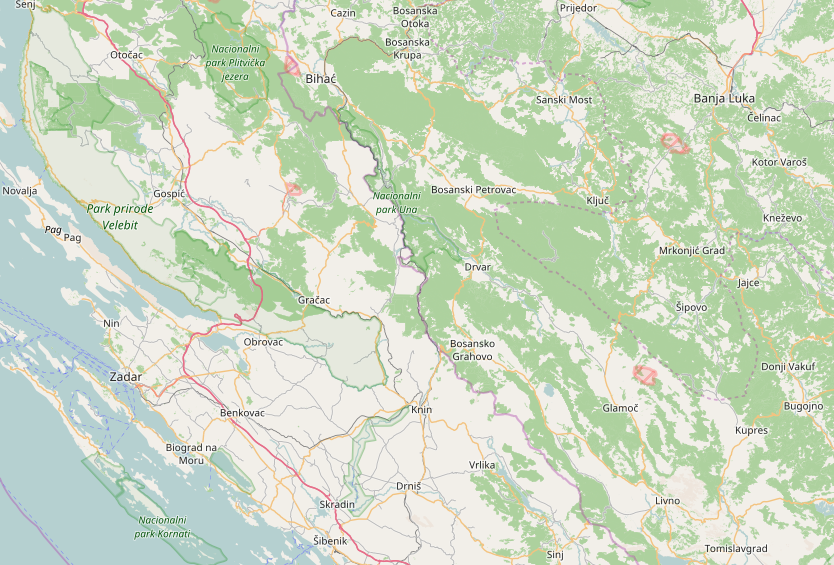
- Locations of massacres in summer 1941
- Location: Trubar, Drvar, Independent State of Croatia (modern-day Bosnia and Herzegovina)
- Date: July 27, 1941
- Target: Croatian civilians
- Attack type: war crime, mass killing
- Deaths: 200-300+
- Victim: Waldemar Maximilian Nestor
- Perpetrator: Serb rebels (either Chetniks or Yugoslav Partisans)

A massacre of Croat civilians was committed by local Serb rebels on 27 July 1941 in village Trubar in Drvar municipality Independent State of Croatia (modern-day Bosnia and Herzegovina). It was one of a number of massacres in the southwestern Bosnian Krajina during the Drvar uprising and Eastern Lika.

== Background ==
On 27 July 1941, a Yugoslav Partisan-led uprising began in the area of Drvar and Bosansko Grahovo. It was a coordinated effort from both sides of the Una River in the territory of southeastern Lika and southwestern Bosanska. It succeeded in transferring key NDH territory under rebel control.

== Incident ==
Parishioners of the Catholic parish in Drvar went on a pilgrimage near Knin on 26 July 1941. The massacre occurred in village of Trubar, 18 km from Drvar, where local Serb rebels (either Chetnik or Yugoslav Partisan) stopped a train at Vaganj station, separating and killing the pilgrims who were returning from Knin on 27 July. Murdered pilgrims, among whom was a German Roman Catholic priest, Waldemar Maximilian Nestor, were thrown into the pit of Golubnjača. Shortly afterwards massacres occurred in surrounding villages. Some sources cite over 300 fatalities, yet many of the bodies that were thrown into deep caves, have yet to be fully exhumed.

One of the witnesses of the massacre was a Partisan, Stevo Babić, who wrote that a group of rebels had executed train passengers at Golubnjača. According to Croatian scholar Blanka Matković, the Yugoslav Partisans were responsible for the massacre.

== Exhumation ==
The Prosecutor's Office of Bosnia and Herzegovina announced in November 2015 that exhumations of bodies from the pit of Golubnjača were carried out and that these are the bodies of pilgrims killed in July 1941. Bodies were buried in priests' tomb in Banja Luka. Franjo Komarica, Bishop of Banja Luka, requested from the Office an investigation of the crime.

== See also ==
- Pogrom in Krnjeuša
- Srb uprising
