= Krnjeuša =

Krnjeuša Крњеуша
- Village
- Location within Bosnia and Herzegovina
- Coordinates: 44°41′N 16°14′E
- Country: Bosnia and Herzegovina
- Entity: Federation of Bosnia and Herzegovina
- Canton: Una-Sana
- Municipality: Bosanski Petrovac

Area
  - Total: 15.45 sq mi (40.02 km^{2})

Population (2013)
  - Total: 495
  - Density: 32.0/sq mi (12.4/km^{2})
- Time zone: UTC+1 (CET)
  - Summer (DST): UTC+2 (CEST)

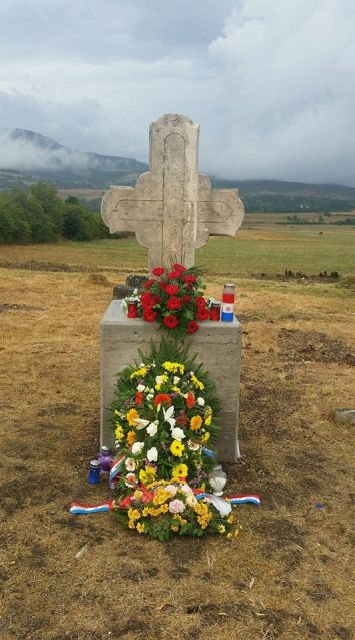
Memorial cross in Krnjeuša, Bosnia and Herzegovina

Krnjeuša (Serbian Cyrillic: Крњеуша) is a village in the municipality of Bosanski Petrovac, Bosnia and Herzegovina.

== Demographics ==
According to the 2013 census, its population was 495.

Ethnicity in 2013
Ethnicity	Number	Percentage
Serbs	492	99.4%
Bosniaks	1	0.2%
Croats	1	0.2%
other/undeclared	1	0.2%
Total	495	100%

== See also ==
- Pogrom in Krnjeuša
