= Sitnica, Bosnia and Herzegovina =

Sitnica Ситница
- Village
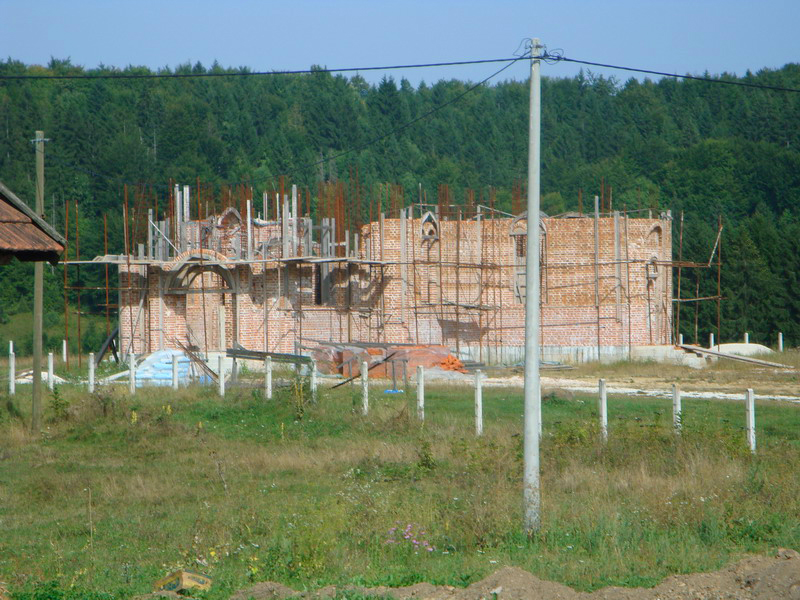

- Location within Bosnia and Herzegovina
- Coordinates: 44°31′13″N 16°55′58″E
- Country: Bosnia and Herzegovina
- Entity: Republika Srpska
- Municipality: Ribnik

Population (2013)
  - Total: 218
- Time zone: UTC+1 (CET)
  - Summer (DST): UTC+2 (CEST)

Sitnica (Serbian Cyrillic: Ситница) is a village in the municipality of Ribnik, Republika Srpska, Bosnia and Herzegovina. As of 2013, the village had a population of 218 inhabitants.

== Notable people ==
- Uroš Drenović (1911–1944), military commander
