= Stekerovci =

Stekerovci Стекеровци
- Village
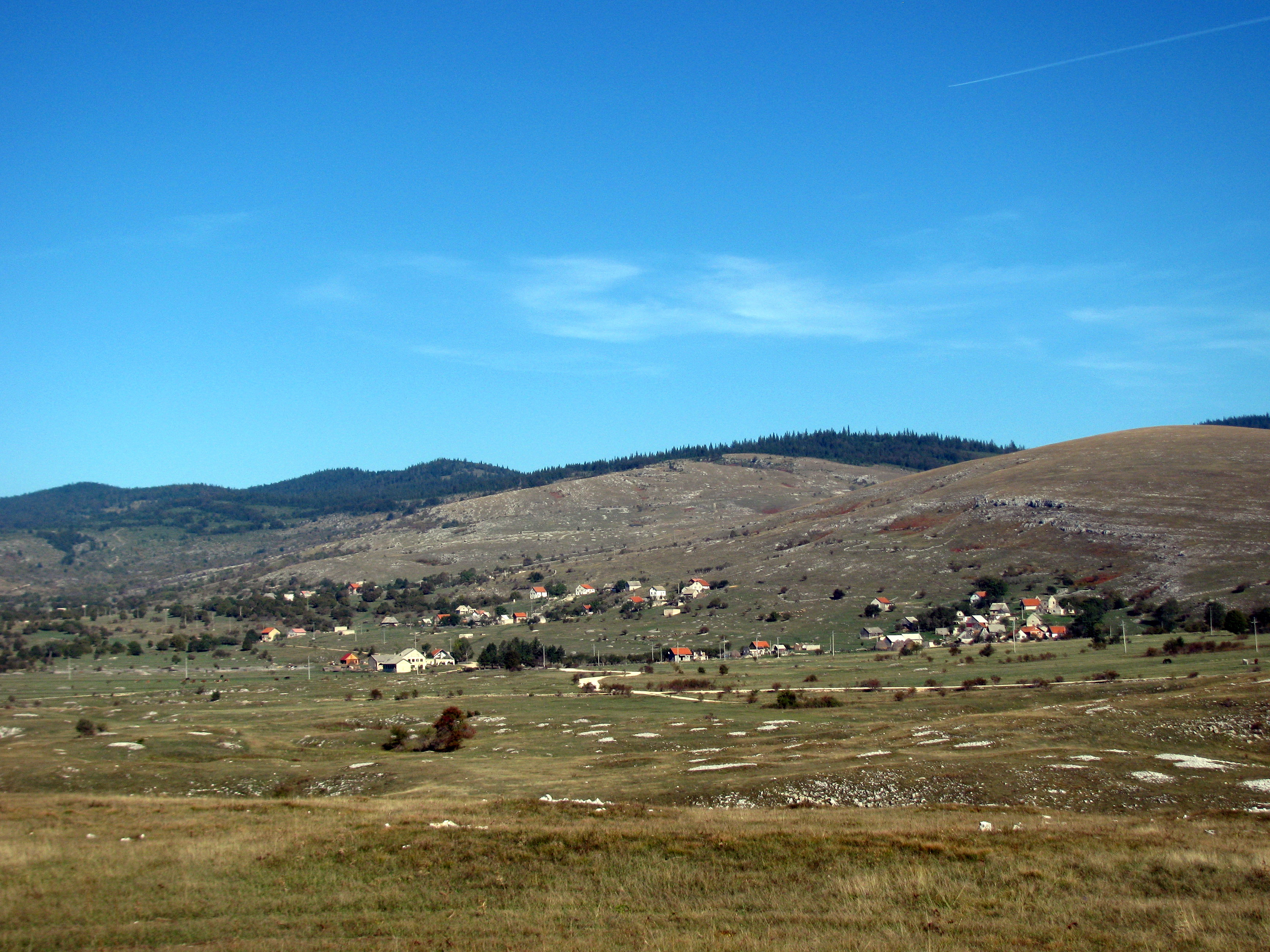
- Panoramic view of Stekerovci

- Location within Bosnia and Herzegovina
- Coordinates: 44°13′47″N 16°44′32″E
- Country: Bosnia and Herzegovina
- Entity: Federation of Bosnia and Herzegovina
- Canton: Canton 10
- Municipality: Glamoč

Area
  - Total: 24.90 sq mi (64.48 km^{2})

Population (2013)
  - Total: 58
  - Density: 2.3/sq mi (0.90/km^{2})
- Time zone: UTC+1 (CET)
  - Summer (DST): UTC+2 (CEST)

Stekerovci (Serbian Cyrillic: Стекеровци) is a village in the Municipality of Glamoč in Canton 10 of the Federation of Bosnia and Herzegovina, an entity of Bosnia and Herzegovina.

== Demographics ==
According to the 2013 census, its population was 58, all Serbs.

== Notable residents ==
- Milutin Morača

== Bibliography ==
- Ethnicity/National Affiliation, Religion and Mother Tongue (PDF). Sarajevo: Agency for Statistics of Bosnia and Herzegovina. 2019.
