= Milutin Morača =

Yugoslav partisan and general

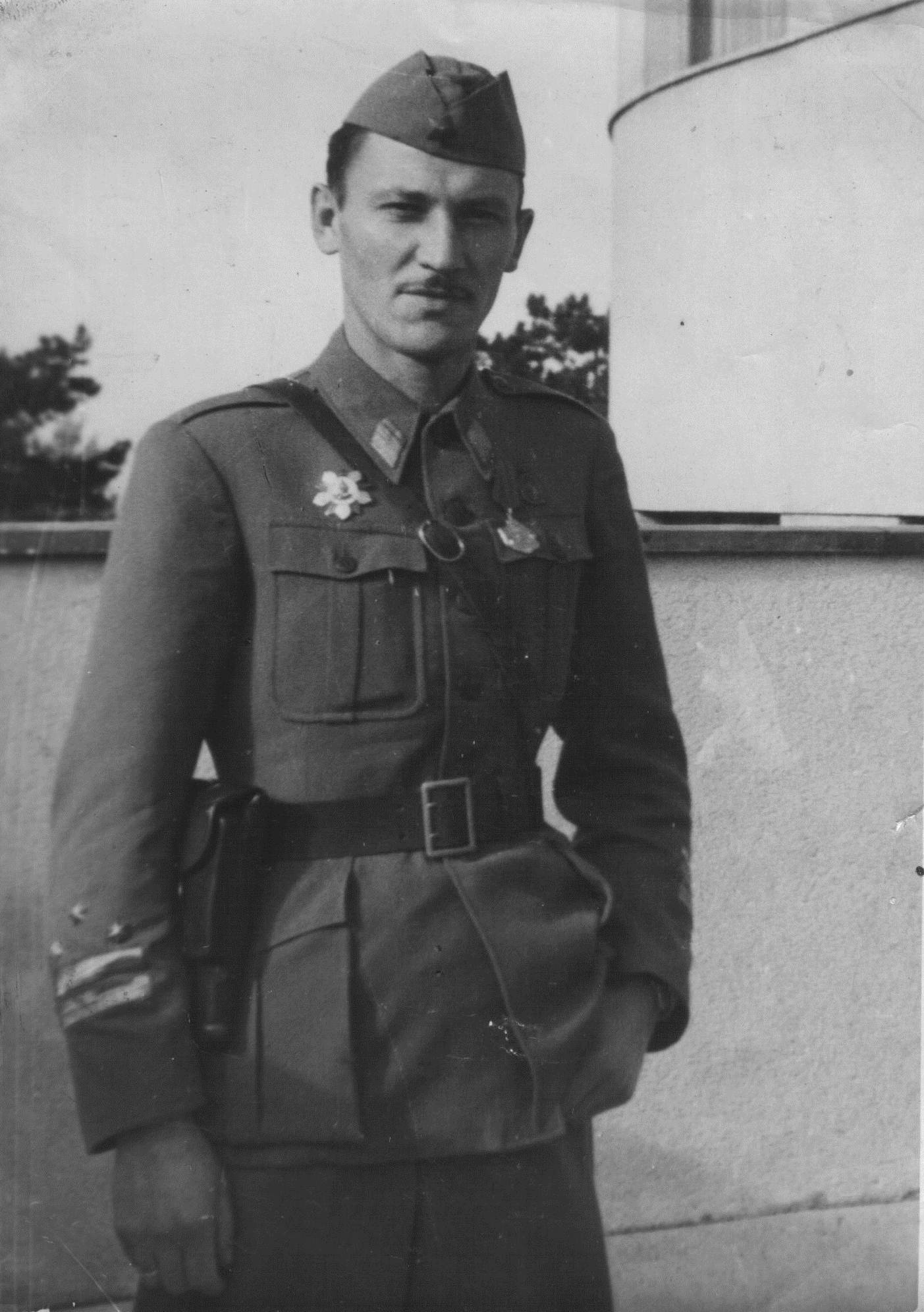
- Milutin Morača circa 1944
- Born: 7 July 1914; Stekerovci, Bosnia and Hezegovina, Austro-Hungary
- Died: 17 December 2003 (aged 89); Belgrade, Serbia and Montenegro
- Military career
- Allegiance: Democratic Federal Yugoslavia, Federal People's Republic of Yugoslavia
- Service years: 1941–?
- Rank: Colonel General
- Units: 4th Krajina Assault Brigade; 5th Krajina Division
- Conflicts: World War II in Yugoslavia: Invasion of Yugoslavia; Drvar uprising; Operation Weiss; Belgrade Operation; Syrmian Front

Milutin Morača (Serbian: Милутин Морача; 7 July 1914 – 17 December 2003) was a Yugoslav partisan, general of Yugoslav People's Army and People's Hero of Yugoslavia. His brother Pero, was historian and also a partisan.

Prior to World War II, his family settled in village Žednik near Subotica, where Milutin, as law student, joined then the illegal Communist Party of Yugoslavia. He was mobilized in the Royal Yugoslav Army after the Yugoslav coup d'état. After Yugoslav defeat in the April War, he was captured by the Hungarian army, but he was soon released and, as a colonist, he was to forced return to his birth area. There he joined local communists in their preparation for the uprising against the Independent State of Croatia and Axis occupation.

Between May 1943 and January 1945, he was commander of the 5th Krajina Division. He led the division during the Belgrade Operation. He was appointed Chief of Staff of the First Army of the NOVJ in 1945, and during the breakthrough of the Syrmian Front, he directly commanded the Northern Group of Divisions.

After World War II, Morača held various high posts in Yugoslav People's Army, Federal Executive Council and federal and republic parliaments.

== Sources ==
- Lukač, Dušan (1967). Ustanak u Bosanskoj Krajini [Uprising in the Bosnian Krajina] (in Serbo-Croatian). Belgrade, Yugoslavia: Vojnoizdavački Zavod. OCLC 494388127.
