= Waldemar Maximilian Nestor =

First Roman Catholic priest known to have been murdered in World War II in Yugoslavia

- Parish priest of Drvar
- Diocese: Diocese of Banja Luka

Orders
- Ordination: 2 February 1917

Personal details
- Born: 12 December 1888 Groß Strehlitz, German Empire
- Died: 27 July 1941 (aged 52) Trubar (near Bihać), Independent State of Croatia
- Denomination: Roman Catholicism
- Parents: Anton and Julija (née Hepner) Nestor

Waldemar Maximilian Nestor (12 December 1888 – 27 July 1941) was the first Roman Catholic priest known to have been murdered in World War II in Yugoslavia.

The Holy See started the process of beatification on 21 December 2014 of Nestor and three other priests of the Diocese of Banja Luka who were murdered during the Second World War, Juraj Gospodnetić, Antun Dujlović and Krešimir Barišić.

== Life ==
Waldemar Maximilian Nestor was born in Groß Strehlitz to Anton and Julija (née Hepner) Nestor. His family moved near Banja Luka in Austria-Hungary when his father got a job there as a state forester. Nestor continued his education at the Trappist Mariastern Abbey. He was ordained a priest on 2 February 1917 as a member of the abbey where he served as a teacher in the abbey's elementary school and as a governor of the abbey's resources.

In 1931 he left the Trappist order and joined the diocesan priests after which he was appointed parochial vicar in Ljubunčić. In 1936 he was transferred to Bosanski Petrovac where he was appointed parish priest. As the majority of Catholics of the parish had lived in Drvar, he moved the parish seat there.

== Death ==
On 26 July 1941 he went with his parishioners on a pilgrimage to Saint Ana near Knin. On the way back to Drvar on 27 July, near Trubar, members of partisan movement who fought Ustashi stopped the train and killed the group.
