= Anti-Chetnik Battalions =

- Protivčetnički Bataljoni
- Allegiance: Yugoslav Communist Party
- Role: destruction of Chetniks
- Size: Kozara Battalion - 400 Partisans; Grmeč Battalion - 800 Partisans; Slavonia Battalion - 100 Partisans
- Engagements: Kozara Оffensive; The Battle of Korač

Commanders
- Kozara Shock Anti-Chetnik Battalion: Branko Stupar
- Anti-Chetnik Battalion in Slavonia: Milan Joka

The Anti-Chetnik Battalions (Serbo-Croatian: Protivčetnički Bataljoni) were established by the supreme headquarter of the communist Yugoslav Partisans in the Independent State of Croatia (territorially largely corresponding to modern-day Bosnia and Herzegovina and Croatia) at the beginning of the World War II to fight against Chetniks. Two Anti-Chetnik battalions were established in Bosnia in 1942 and one in Slavonia in 1943.

Two anti-Chetnik battalions in Bosnia were:

- The Kozara Shock Anti-Chetnik Battalion
- The Grmeč Shock Anti-Chetnik Battalion

The Kozara Shock Anti-Chetnik Battalion was established on 1 April 1942 of the best soldiers of the Second Krajina Brigade.

To counter Chetnik military activities in Posavina after Chetnik Mayor Janjić moved with some of his forces from Bosnia to Slavonia at the beginning of 1943, the Partisans established Anti-Chetnik Battalion in Slavonia in August 1943. This battalion was composed exclusively of soldiers of Serb ethnicity. The zone of operations of this Anti-Chetnik battalion was in the territory of Okučani and Stara Gradiška, between river Sava and railway tracks connecting Jasenovac and Novska.

== Bosnia ==
=== Background ===
One of the motives for Partisans to establish Anti-Chetnik Battalions was widespread Chetnik action at the beginning of 1942 in Eastern Bosnia in which Chetniks successfully infiltrated into command of several larger Partisans detachments and organized successful putsches. After the command was taken over by the men loyal to Chetniks, they would convince the complete Partisan units to switch sides and join Chetnik ranks. The Partisans first established Proletarian Battalion in Čelinac near Banja Luka on 25 March 1942 with task to fight against Chetniks. Although the members of this battalion were the best Partisan fighters it was not strong enough and Chetniks successfully organized putsch in Ozren Partisan Detachment on 18 April 1942 and forced Proletarian Battalion to retreat from mountain Ozren destroying its fourth company. According to some sources the Proletarian Battalion was seriously defeated by Chetniks and only 104 Partisans survived Chetnik attacks by retreating to Slavonia across Sava.

To better counter this kind of Chetniks actions and to return former Partisan units back to their ranks the supreme headquarter of the communist forces in Bosnia and Herzegovina ordered establishment of the Shock Anti-Chetnik Battalions.

=== Grmeč Anti-Chetnik Battalion ===
The Grmeč Anti-Chetnik Battalion had 800 Partisans who fought against Chetniks of Drenović, Vukašin Marčetić and Laza Tešanović in period April–May 1942. The pressure of the Grmeč Anti-Chetnik Battalion forced Uroš Drenović, commander of Petar Kočić Chetnik Detachment to sign an accord with representatives of the Independent State of Croatia on 25 April 1942.

=== Kozara Anti-Chetnik Battalion ===
The Kozara Shock Anti-Chetnik Battalion was established on 1 April 1942 and composed by recruiting the best soldiers of the 1st and 2nd battalion of the Second Krajina Brigade. This battalion operated as part of the Second Krajina (Kozara) Brigade.

In April 1942 there were two companies of the Shock Anti-Chetnik Battalion composed of recruits from the region below mountain Grmeč with 400 Partisans selected among the best fighters.

In July 1942 the commander of the Anti-Chetnik battalion Branko Stupar was killed after being imprisoned during the Kozara Оffensive.

The Kozara Anti-Chetnik Battalion could not prevent defections of the whole Partisan 2nd and 3rd Detachments to Chetniks. Newly formed Chetnik units defeated the Anti-Chetnik Battalion in Korač.

The Kozara Anti-Chetnik Battalion fought fierce battles against Chetniks in the area of Central Bosnia.

== Slavonia ==
=== Establishment ===
At the beginning of 1943 Chetnik Major Vlado Janjić shortly stayed in Slavonia with small group of Chetniks until they were attacked and forced to retreat to Bosnia by Anti-Chetnik Battalion which was already established.

To counter Chetnik activities in Slavonia and destroy all Chetnik units that appear in Slavonia, the Partisans established Anti-Chetnik Battalion in Slavonia on 21 August 1943. This Battalion was composed of soldiers of Serb ethnicity.

The Anti-Chetnik Battalion had 100 partisans with 10 machine-guns, 2 small mortars and 90 rifles. The main task of Anti-Chetnik Battalions was to mobilize Serbs in Posavina and to prevent any military activity of Chetniks. Its commander was Milan Joka while its political commissar was Čedo Grbić. Their task was also to mobilize additional Serbs into his battalion and turn it into Anti-Chetnik Brigade.

The zone of operations of the anti-Chetnik battalion was in the territory of Okučani and Stara Gradiška, between river Sava and railway tracks connecting Jasenovac and Novska. The Anti-Chetnik Battalion in Slavonia was the only Partisan unit which did something to free inmates of Jasenovac extermination camp. In August 1943 a group of 25 inmates using the opportunity to tried to escape during cleaning the forest and laying telephone cables in village Drenov Rok. The Anti-Chetnik Battalion attacked their guards killing two of them and wounding two and transferred released inmates to the territory under Communist control.

After this Battalion forced Chetniks to withdraw from Slavonia back to Bosnia, it was concluded that other regular Partisan units can deal with remnants of Chetnik movement in Slavonia, so this battalion was merged into newly-established Brigade of Czech minority in Yugoslavia.

== Legacy ==
The Anti-Chetnik Battalion was mentioned in Doživljaji Nikoletine Bursaća novel authored by Branko Ćopić. The cast of Španac played by Mustafa Nadarević in the movie Long Dark Night directed by Antun Vrdoljak was, according to some opinions, in fact Čedo Grbić commessair of the Anti-Chetnik Battalion.

== Sources ==
- Redžić, Enver (2005). Bosnia and Herzegovina in the Second World War. Psychology Press. ISBN 978-0-7146-5625-0.
- Latas, Branko (1979). Četnički pokret Draže Mihailovića: 1941-1945. Beogradski izdavačko-grafički zavod.
- Bokan, Branko (1972). Podgrmeč u NOB.: Podgrmeč do ustanka i u ustanku 1941. Vojnoizdavački zavod.
- Arsenić, Borko O.; Milinović, Đuro P. (1969). Plamen pod Kozarom. Savez udruženja boraca narodnooslobodilačkog rata.
- Faculty (1970). Recueil des travaux de recherches de la Faculté agronomique. Faculty of Agriculture, University of Beograd.
- VI (1957). Zbornik dokumenata i podataka o narodnooslobodilačkom ratu jugoslovenskih naroda. Vojnoistorijski institut (Belgrade, Serbia).
- Удружење (2006). "Грађански рат у Хрватској 1991-1995": зборник радова. Удружење Срба из Хрватске. ISBN 9788683809349.
- Hrečkovski, Slavica (1970). Građa za historiju narodnooslobodilac̆kog pokreta u Slavoniji.
- Vignjević, Milorad (1978). Kozara u narodnooslobodilačkom ratu: Zapisi i sjećanja. Sjećanja prikupio Milorad Vignjević. Vojnoizdavački zavod.
- Bulajić, Milan (2002). Jasenovac: the Jewish Serbian holocaust (the role of the Vatican) in Nazi-Ustasha Croatia (1941-1945). Fund for Genocide Research. ISBN 9788641902211.
- Đuretić, Veselin (1997). Violence against the Serb uprising. Institut. ISBN 9788671790246.
- Karabegović, Osman (1988). Bosanska krajina nepresušivi izvor revolucionarnih snaga. Vojnoizdavački i novinski centar.
- Papadopolos, Dušan (1974). AVNOJ i narodnooslobodilačka borba u Bosni i Hercegovini: 1942-1943 : materijali sa naučnog skupa održanog u Sarajevu 22. i 23. novembra 1973. godine. Rad.
- Petranović, Branko (1981). Istorija Jugoslavije: 1918-1978. Nolit.
- Vidović, Gabro (1965). Među slavonskim partizanima. Epoha.
- Čalić, Dušan (1987). Svjedočenja o pokoljenju revolucionara. Globus. ISBN 9788634303506.
- Ćopić, Branko (1966). Doživljaji Nikoletine Bursaća. Državna Založba Slovenije.
- Goldstein, Slavko; Goldstein, Ivo (2011). Jasenovac i Bleiburg nisu isto. Novi Liber. ISBN 978-953-325-009-0.
