= Branko Bogunović =

Yugoslav Army officer

- Бранко Богуновић
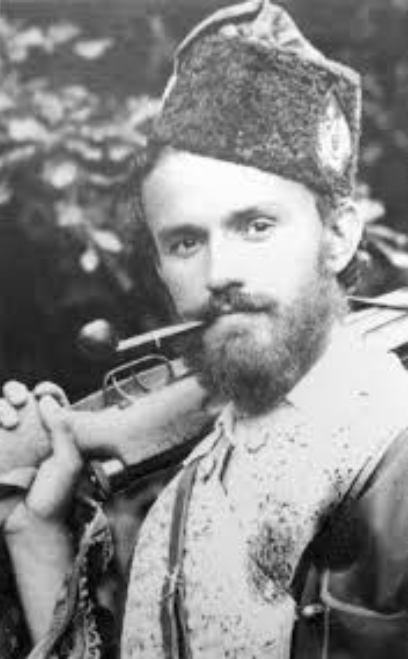
- Born: 24 November 1911; Drvar, Bosnia and Herzegovina, Austria-Hungary
- Died: 1945 (aged 33–34); Šibenik, Yugoslavia
- Military career
- Allegiance: Kingdom of Yugoslavia
- Service: Serb rebels; Chetniks
- Rank: voivode (since 1942)
- Nickname: Brane
- Commands: Unit of Serb rebels during the Drvar uprising; (Chetniks) Dinara Chetnik Division; Chetnik Corp "Gavrilo Princip"; Chetnik Brigade "Gavrilo Princip"
- Conflicts: Drvar uprising
- Awards: Order of the Star of Karađorđe

Branko "Brane" Bogunović (Serbian Cyrillic: Бранко Бране Богуновић; 24 November 1911 – 1945) was one of the commanders of Serb rebels during the Drvar uprising who later became an officer of the Yugoslav Army in the Fatherland.

On 27 July 1941, Bogunović commanded the Serb rebels who captured Bosansko Grahovo from the Ustaše. He joined the Yugoslav Army in the Fatherland (Chetniks) and became the commander of the "Gavrilo Princip" Chetnik Regiment, a part of Dinara Chetnik Division. After about a year, the regiment under his control became a brigade. In 1942 Bogunović was awarded the Karađorđe's Star by Slobodan Jovanović, president of the Yugoslav Government in Exile, while commander of the Dinara Chetnik Division, Ilija Trifunović Birčanin promoted Bogunović to the rank of voivode.

Bogunović and other local Chetnik commanders temporarily accepted the Italian and German occupation. He is responsible for the massacre of the Croat civilians in Bosansko Grahovo. In December 1944, Bogunović was captured by the communist partisans and died in prison in 1945.

== Early life ==
Before World War II, Bogunović was a forester.

== During World War II ==
Bogunović was one of the commanders of the rebel units during the Drvar uprising. Bogunović commanded the rebels who captured Bosansko Grahovo from Ustaše on 27 July 1941. He belonged to rebel leaders who joined the Yugoslav Army in the Fatherland (Chetniks) after the Italians took over the control of the territory captured in the rebellion. The Chetnik leaders, including Bogunović, had accepted the rule of Italians and Germans. When in September 1941 Italians peacefully took over control over the territory captured by the rebels during the Drvar uprising, Bogunović became commander of the Chetnik Regiment "Gavrilo Princip" from Bosansko Grahovo. He was also responsible for the massacre of the Croat civilians.

In January 1942 Bogunović was awarded by Slobodan Jovanović, president of the Yugoslav Government in Exile with Karađorđe's Star. In 1942 the Chetnik Regiment "Gavrilo Princip" became part of the Dinara Chetnik Division. The regiment had two battalions with total number of 800 men armed with 4 heavy machine guns, 8 light machine guns and 70 bullets for gun of each soldier. Also in 1942 Mane Rokvić and Bogunović were promoted to the rank of voivode by the commander of Dinara Chetnik Division, Ilija Trifunović Birčanin. At the beginning of 1943 the regiment under his command became the Chetnik Brigade "Gavrilo Princip".

The command of Drvar Partisan Brigade sentenced Bogunović to death. According to post-war source published in the communist controlled Yugoslavia, Bogunović was arrested after the communist forces captured Knin in December 1944 and imprisoned in Split prison, where he committed suicide. The pro-Chetnik source authored by Miloslav Samardžić claim that Bogunović was thrown through the window.

== Sources ==
- Dizdar, Zdravko (2002). Četnički zločini u Bosni i Hercegovini, 1941.-1945. Hrvatski institut za povijest. ISBN 978-953-6491-86-5.
- Redžić, Enver (1998). Bosna i Hercegovina u Drugom svjetskom ratu. OKO. ISBN 978-9958-43-030-5.
- Vučković, Zvonimir; Krstić, Uglješa (2001). Ravnogorska istorijska čitanka: povest nacionalnog pokreta otpora u II svetskom ratu kroz dela učesnika i svedoka : jubilarno izdanje povodom šezdesetgodišnjice, 1941-2001. Bajat.
- Gizdić, Drago (1957). Dalmacija 1941: prilozi historiji Narodnooslobodilačke borbe. Izdavačko poduzeće "27. srpanj,".
- Kvesić, Sibe (1979). Dalmacija u narodnooslobodilačkoj borbi. Institut za historiju radničkog pokreta Dalmacije.
- Redžić, Enver (2005). Bosnia and Herzegovina in the Second World War. Psychology Press. ISBN 978-0-7146-5625-0.
- Dizdar, Zdravko; Sobolevski, Mihael (1999). Prešućivani četnički zločini u Hrvatskoj i u Bosni i Hercegovini 1941.-1945. Hrvatski institut za povijest. ISBN 978-953-6491-28-5.
- Dedijer, Vladimir (1946). Dnevnik: Svedočanstva iz oslobodilačkog rata. (Od 28 Novembra 1942 do 10 Novembra 1943). Državni izdavački zavod Jugoslavije.
