= Order of Karađorđe's Star =

Serbian state and dynastic decoration

Order of Karađorđe's Star Орден Карађорђеве звезде
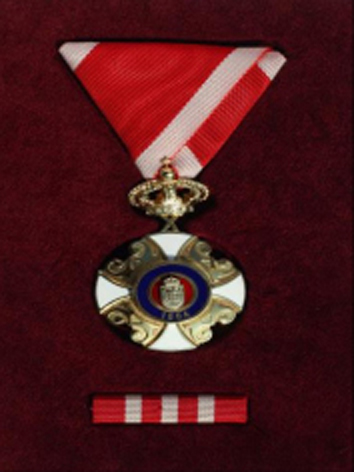
- The cross of the order

Awarded by Republic of Serbia
- Type: State order
- Established: 2010
- Eligibility: Serbian citizens
- Awarded for: Special merits and successes in representing Serbia and its citizens
- Status: Active
- Classes: 1st Degree; 2nd Degree; 3rd Degree

Statistics
- First induction: 2012

Precedence
- Next (higher): Order of the Serbian Flag
- Next (lower): Order of the White Eagle with Swords
- 1st Degree; 2nd Degree; 3rd Degree; Ribbon bars of the state order

Order of Karađorđe's Star (Serbian: Орден Карађорђеве звезде) is the name of two different active Serbian orders, one being state and other dynastic.

== State order ==
The state Order of Karađorđe's Star (Serbian: Орден Карађорђеве звезде, romanized: Orden Karađorđeve zvezde) is the third highest state order of Serbia. The order is awarded by the decree of the President of the Republic on special occasions, typically at the ceremonies held on the Statehood Day. It is awarded for special merits and successes in representing Serbia and its citizens. It can be awarded to individuals and institutions.

In 2010, the order was established as an official state order, being the third highest state honour.

In 2012, tennis player Novak Djokovic became the first person to receive the order after it was reinstated. In 2020, Nobel Prize winner Peter Handke received the order.

=== Design ===
The medallions of the insignia come in gold and the obverse features a white enameled cross pattée with gilt spiral pattern and are based on the same type of design and style of the dynastic order of Karađorđe Star.

=== Grades ===
State order of Karađorđe's Star has three grades.

| 1st Degree | 2nd Degree | 3rd Degree |

=== Notable recipients ===
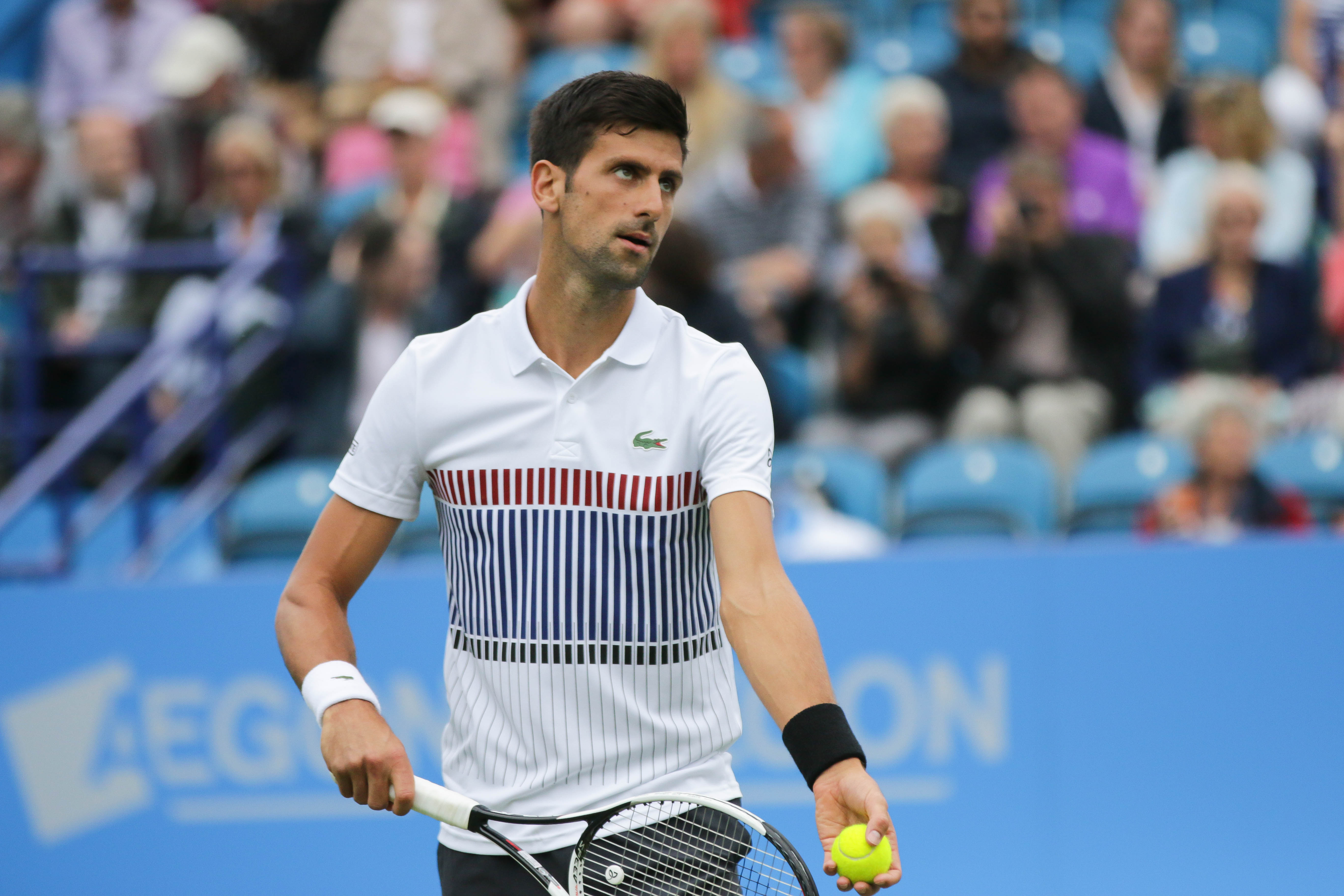
Tennis player Novak Djokovic was the first person to receive the Order after its reinstatement in 2010.

=== Grand Cross ===
- 2024 - Katherine Karađorđević
- 2024 - Dejan Milojević
- 2022 - Siniša Mihajlović
- 2021 - Miki Manojlović
- 2021 - Bora Đorđević
- 2021 - Momčilo Bajagić Bajaga
- 2021 - Milan Cile Marinković
- 2021 - Stefan Milenkovich
- 2021 - Jadranka Jovanović
- 2021 - Predrag Antonijević
- 2020 - Peter Handke
- 2020 - Gordana Vunjak-Novakovic
- 2018 - Ljubiša Diković
- 2016 - Paralympic Committee of Serbia
- 2017 - Olympic Committee of Serbia
- 2012 - Novak Djokovic

=== Commanders ===
- 2021 - Serb National Council of Montenegro
- 2021 - Air Serbia
- 2021 - Minja Subota
- 2020 - Danica Grujičić
- 2017 - Nemanja Radulović

=== Members ===
- 2023 - Zoran Kalabić
- 2021 - Nataša Drakulić
- 2017 - Marina Maljković
- 2017 - Ivana Španović
- 2017 - Jelena Janković
- 2017 - Ana Ivanovic

== Dynastic order ==
Order of Karađorđe's Star Орден Карађорђеве звезде
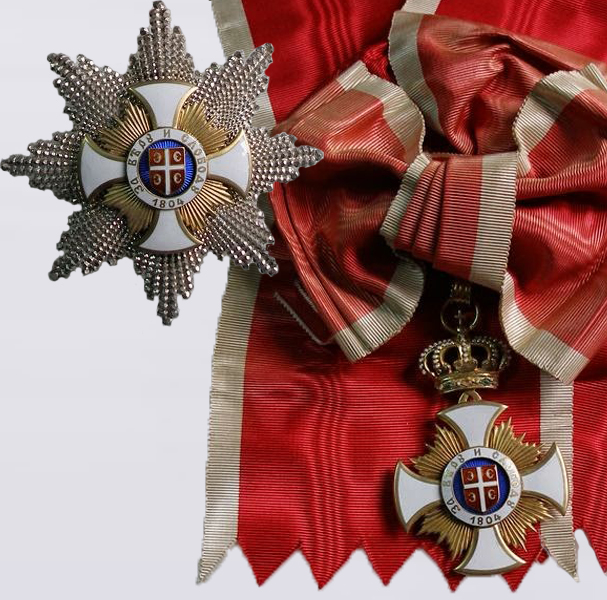
- The cross of the order

Awarded by Kingdom of Serbia Kingdom of Yugoslavia House of Karađorđević
- Type: State order (1904-1945); Dynastic order (since 1945)
- Established: 1904
- Eligibility: Serbian citizens
- Awarded for: services to the House of Karađorđević, the Serbian state or the Serb people
- Status: Active
- Founder: King Peter I
- Grand Master: Crown Prince Alexander
- Classes: Knight Grand Cross; Knight Grand Officer; Knight Commander; Knight Officer; Knight

Statistics
- First induction: 1904

Precedence
- Next (higher): Order of St. Prince Lazar
- Next (lower): Order of the White Eagle
- Ribbon bars of the order

The royal Order of Karađorđe's Star (Serbian: Орден Карађорђеве звезде, romanized: Orden Zvezde Karađorđeve) is the most senior royal dynastic order-order of knighthood of the house of Karađorđević, which formerly ruled the Kingdom of Serbia and its short-lived successor sovereign state, the Kingdom of Yugoslavia.

It was initially awarded exclusively to Serbian citizens in return for services rendered to the Serbian state and the Serbian people. During the Balkan Wars and World War I, the order was mostly awarded for acts of bravery on the battlefield. The post-war Kingdom of Yugoslavia retained the order, and it was awarded by the Yugoslav government-in-exile until the end of World War II. Following the war, the monarchy was abolished and a communist government came to power suppressing the order along with other monarchist symbols, although it continues as a dynastic order, awarded by the Head of the House of Karađorđević in exile.

The order is currently but rarely awarded, with appointments and investitures made by the Sovereign, Crown Prince Alexander.

=== History ===
The Order of Karađorđe's Star was instituted by the royal decree of King Peter I on 1 January 1904, commemorating his recent accession to the Serbian throne, as well as the one-hundredth anniversary of the First Serbian Uprising. It was meant to replace the Order of the Cross of Takovo and the Order of Miloš the Great, two decorations that had been awarded by the rival Obrenović dynasty, which ruled Serbia prior to the May 1903 coup d'état that reinstated Peter's house of Karađorđević after several decades in exile. The first award was disagreeable to the Karađorđevićes and their supporters because it was named after Takovo, the village where the house of Obrenović founder Miloš Obrenović had launched the Second Serbian Uprising. The Order of Miloš the Great had to be replaced as it was named after Obrenović himself.

The order was usually awarded for services to the Karađorđević dynasty, the Serbian state or the Serb people, while Karađorđević princes received a Grand Cross at baptism. Recipients included both soldiers and civilians, though until 1906 only Serbian citizens were permitted to receive the award.

During the Balkan Wars, the Kingdom of Serbia introduced the War Meritorious version of the Order of the Star of Karađorđe to reward acts of "conspicuous gallantry of commissioned officers in the field", as well as the battlefield victories of the Royal Serbian Army's senior officers; non-commissioned officers and soldiers in the field were ineligible. In June 1915, at the height of World War I, the Kingdom of Serbia instituted a sub-division of the version referred to as the Military Cross, which was awarded to NCOs and soldiers for bravery in combat. The War Meritorious version was divided into two classes: the 1st division Gold Cross and the 2nd division Silver Cross. One of the recipients of the Military version was the highly decorated female soldier Milunka Savić, and another was Flora Sandes, the only British woman to openly serve as a soldier in the war. Several senior Serbian military leaders were recipients of the War Merit Order, including Prince Alexander, and Field marshals Živojin Mišić and Stepa Stepanović. Foreign recipients included American General John J. Pershing, the British Field marshal Douglas Haig, the French generals Joseph Joffre, Maurice Sarrail, Philippe Pétain, and Louis Franchet d'Espèrey, and King Ferdinand I of Romania.

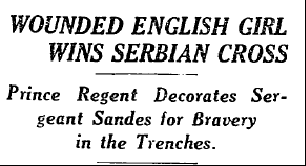
Flora Sandes received the order in 1916. She fought in the Royal Serbian Army during World War I and was the only British woman to officially serve as a soldier in the conflict.

The Kingdom of Yugoslavia retained the order after World War I. In 1939, it was awarded to the city of Belgrade. During World War II, Peter II bestowed the order upon a number of Chetniks on the recommendation of Chetnik leader Draža Mihailović. Some of the decorated Chetnik commanders included Pavle Đurišić, Dobroslav Jevđević, Momčilo Đujić, Brane Bogunović and Uroš Drenović. These decorations proved controversial both during and after the war, as many of the commanders cooperated with the armed forces of Germany, Italy or even Independent State of Croatia against the Communist-led Yugoslav Partisans for most of the occupation period. Such a discrepancy can best be seen in the case of Đujić, who was given the order for displaying "gallantry in the face of the enemy", and subsequently celebrated receiving it at an Italian general's headquarters. In Jevđević's case, the Order was given in 1943 for his services to the Serb population of Herzegovina during a series of Ustaše massacres, but Mihailović had news of the award suppressed, because Jevđević had visited Rome to plan an anti-communist offensive with the Italians and his forces had carried out several massacres of non-Serbs over the previous several years.

After the war, Yugoslavia came under the rule of communist president Josip Broz Tito, and Karađorđević-era medals and orders were replaced by non-royal decorations, such as the Order of the People's Hero. In the 1990s, the Republika Srpska instated its own decoration also called the Order of Karađorđe's Star, though this is not to be confused with the decoration historically awarded by Serbian state and the house of Karađorđević. (Note: Đujić received the Republika Srpska's Order in 1998 for his contributions to the Bosnian Serbs, as did the warlord Željko Ražnatović ("Arkan").)

=== Grades and insignia ===
Initially, the Order of the Karađorđe's Star was categorised as a senior state award, and organised into four grades. The Knight’s Grand Cross, the highest grade, consisted of a badge of the Order on a sash and breast star; a Knight Grand Officer was decorated with a badge necklet and a slightly smaller breast star, a medal and a miniature medal; a Knight Commander was decorated with a badge necklet, a medal and a miniature medal; and a Knight Officer would receive a medal in gold as well as a miniature medal.

=== Design ===
The order comes in either gold or silver depending on the grade and the obverse features a white enameled cross pattée with gilt rays protruding from each of the arms. The rays are intersected diagonally by a pair of sabres when the recipient is awarded an Order "with swords". The circular medallion contains a blue inner medallion at the centre depicting a Serbian cross with a fire-steel at each corner, with the words "For Faith and Freedom, 1804" etched into the small circle in the middle of the cross. The reverse of these orders contains a red medallion depicting a white eagle, with the words "Peter I, 1904" written around it. The bravery medals awarded from 1915 onwards were almost identical to the orders awarded before, save for the crossed swords being present on all of them regardless of class. Such orders also lacked the phrase etched into the obverse of the older ones and the date 1904 on the reverse, which marked the centenary of the First Serbian Uprising. Instead, they merely had King Peter's name on the obverse beside the year when the order was bestowed.

== Works cited ==
Books

- Banac, Ivo (1984). The National Question in Yugoslavia: Origins, History, Politics. Ithaca, New York: Cornell University Press. ISBN 978-0-8014-9493-2.
- Clarke, John (2000). Gallantry Medals & Decorations of the World. London: Pen and Sword Books. ISBN 978-0-85052-783-4.
- Dedijer, Vladimir (1946). Dnevnik: Svedočanstva iz oslobodilačkog rata. (Od 28 Novembra 1942 do 10 Novembra 1943). Državni izdavački zavod Jugoslavije.
- Dedijer, Vladimir (1990). The War Diaries of Vladimir Dedijer. Vol. 2. Ann Arbor, Michigan: University of Michigan Press. ISBN 978-0-472-10109-2.
- Demaria, Cristina; Wright, Colin (2006). Post-conflict Cultures: Rules of Representation. New York: Zoilus Press. ISBN 978-1-902878-58-4.
- Finder, Jennifer (2000). "Women Travellers in the Balkans: A Biographical Guide". In Allcock, John B.; Young, Antonia (eds.). Black Lambs and Grey Falcons: Women Travellers in the Balkans (2 ed.). Bradford, Yorkshire: University of Bradford. ISBN 978-1-57181-807-2.
- Hoare, Marko Attila (2007). The History of Bosnia: From the Middle Ages to the Present Day. London: Saqi. ISBN 978-0-86356-953-1.
- Maclean, Fitzroy (1949). Eastern Approaches. Jonathan Cape. ISBN 978-0-8094-3565-4. OCLC 177456.
- Maclean, Fitzroy (1957). Disputed Barricade: The Life and Times of Josip Broz-Tito, Marshal of Jugoslavia. London: Jonathan Cape. ISBN 978-0-598-56693-5. OCLC 328091.
- Roberts, Walter R. (1973). Tito, Mihailović and the Allies 1941–1945. Durham, North Carolina: Duke University Press. ISBN 978-0-8223-0773-0.
- Smith, Angela K. (2000). The Second Battlefield: Women, Modernism and the First World War. Manchester, England: Manchester University Press. ISBN 978-0-7190-5301-6.

Websites

- "Wounded English Girl Wins Serbian Cross: Prince Regent Decorates Sergeant Sandes for Bravery in the Trenches" (PDF). The New York Times. 31 December 1916.
- "The Order of the Star of Karageorge". Serbian Royal Family. 1997. Archived from the original on 2 March 2012.
- "Odlikovanja Beograda" [Awards and Decorations of Belgrade] (in Serbian). City of Belgrade. 25 December 2003.
- "Ponovo Karađorđeva zvezda i medalja Miloša Obilića" [Star of Karađorđe and Obilić Medal Reinstated] (in Serbian). Glas javnosti. 6 May 2010.
- "Serbia to Bestow Honour on Tennis Star Djokovic". Balkan Insight. 14 February 2012.
- "'National hero' Djokovic given Serbia's highest honor". CNN. 16 February 2012.
- "Milunka Savić, the most awarded female combatant in the history of warfare". Voice of Serbia. 17 July 2014. Archived from the original on 10 September 2016.
