= Bosansko Grahovo =

Bosansko Grahovo Босанско Грахово
- Town
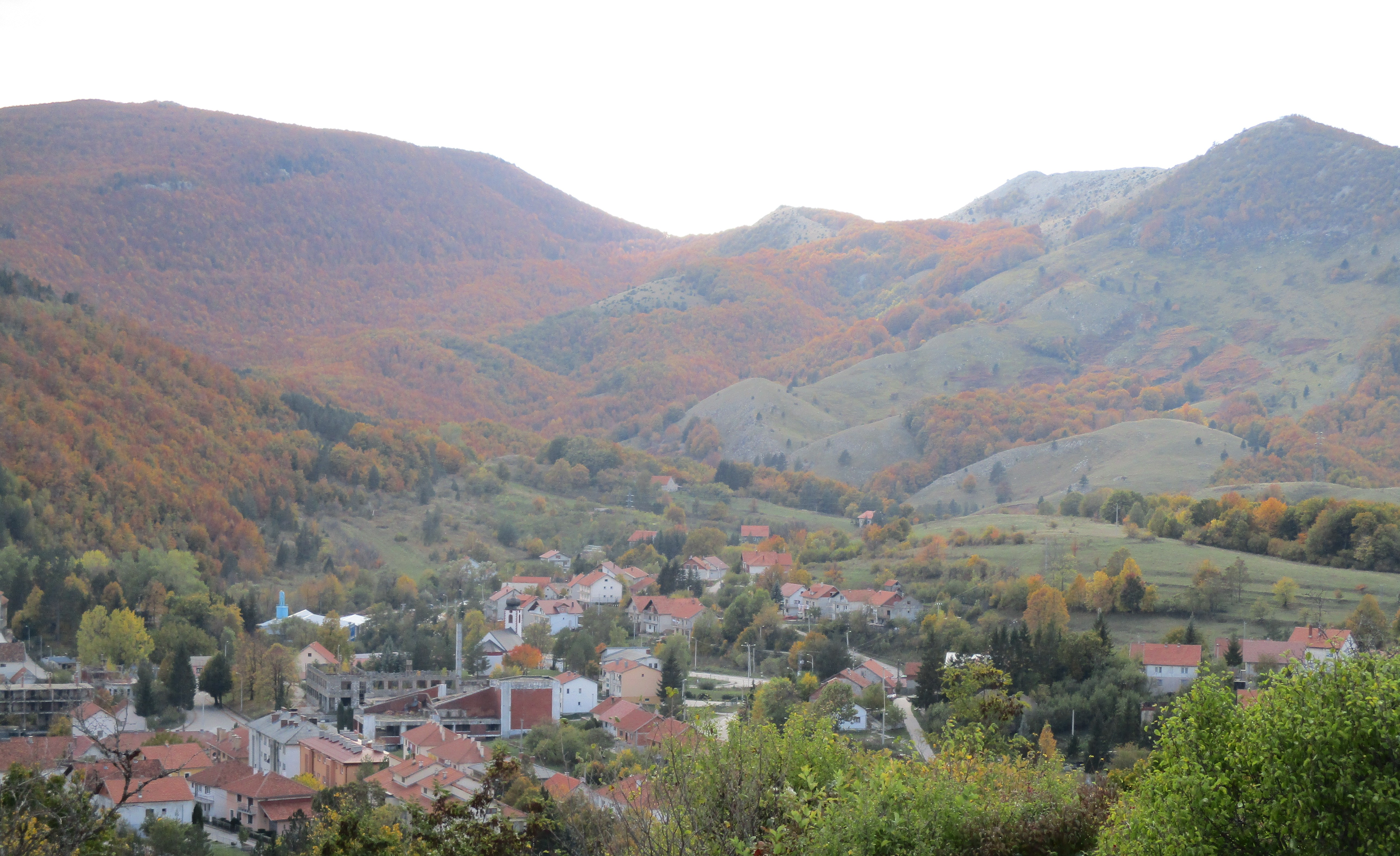
- Bosansko Grahovo

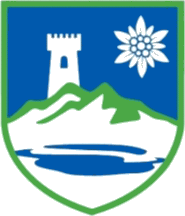
- Coat of arms

- Location of Bosansko Grahovo within Bosnia and Herzegovina
- Coordinates: 44°10′46″N 16°21′52″E
- Country: Bosnia and Herzegovina
- Entity: Federation of Bosnia and Herzegovina
- Canton: Canton 10
- Municipality: Bosansko Grahovo

Government
  - Municipal mayor: Smiljka Radlović (Ind.)

Area
  - Total: 12.01 km^{2} (4.64 sq mi)

Population (2013)
  - Total: 651
  - Density: 54.2/km^{2} (140/sq mi)
- Demonym: Grahovian
- Time zone: UTC+1 (CET)
- Area code: +387 34
- Website: www.bosanskograhovo.ba

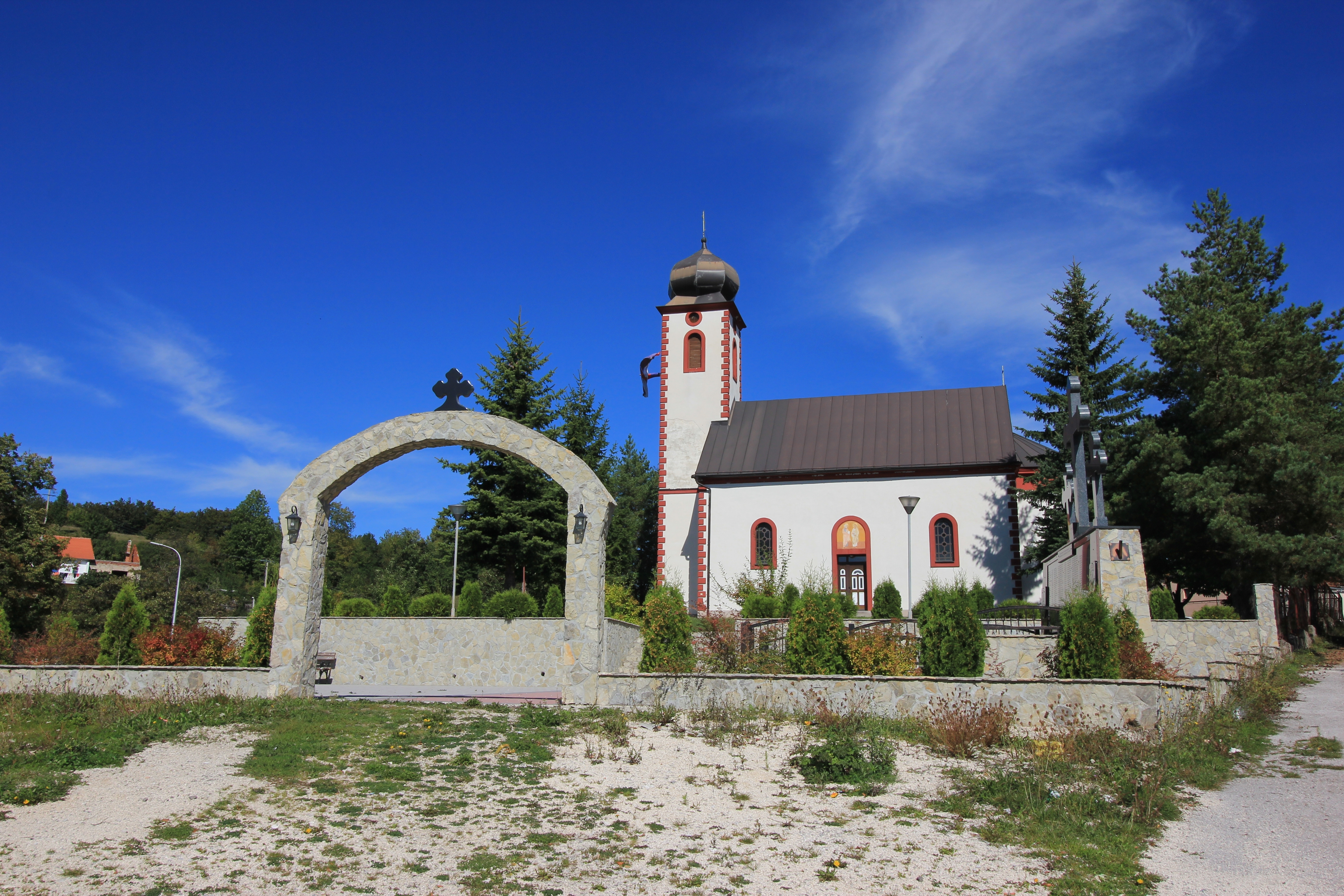
A Serbian Orthodox Church in the town

Bosansko Grahovo (Serbian Cyrillic: Босанско Грахово) is a town and the seat of the Municipality of Bosansko Grahovo in Canton 10 of the Federation of Bosnia and Herzegovina, an entity of Bosnia and Herzegovina. It is situated in western Bosnia and Herzegovina along the border with Croatia. Prior to 1919, it was known as Arežin Brijeg.

== History ==
Until 1919, the settlement was called Arežin Brijeg. From 1929 to 1941, Bosansko Grahovo was part of the Vrbas Banovina of the Kingdom of Yugoslavia.

=== World War II ===
During World War II, from 1941 to 1945, Bosansko Grahovo was a part of the Axis puppet state the Independent State of Croatia (NDH). Administratively, it belonged to the Grand Parish of Krbava and Psat, established on 16 June 1941. The seat of the Parish was in Bihać. The Kotar of Bosansko Grahovo included the town of Bosansko Grahovo, Crni Lug, Drvar and Trubar. On 1 January 1942, the Kotar of Bosansko Grahovo was transferred to the Grand Parish of Bribir and Sidraga.

In the Drvar uprising Grahovo was captured by the Serb rebels commanded by Branko Bogunović. Bogunović joined the Yugoslav Army in the Fatherland and in September 1941 he was appointed as commander of the Chetnik Regiment "Gavrilo Princip" from Grahovo. One hundred Croat civilians were murdered by the Chetniks during the Bosansko Grahovo massacre.

When the German and Italian Zones of Influence were revised on 24 June 1942, Grahovo fell in Zone II, administered civilly by Croatia but militarily by Italy.

=== Bosnian War ===
During the Bosnian War, the town was held by Bosnian Serb forces. The Croatian Army captured the city in July 1995, during Operation Summer '95. The offensive displaced a large number of Serb refugees. After the war, the Serb civilians returned, and today they constitute the majority of the population in the municipality. However, nowadays the population is much smaller, having declined from 9,000 to about 2,500.

== Demographics ==
=== Ethnic composition ===
Ethnic composition
	2013	1991	1981	1971	1961
Total	651 (100.0%)	2,096 (100.0%)	1,602 (100.0%)	1,229 (100.0%)	696 (100.0%)
Serbs	600 (92.17%)	1,999 (95.37%)	1,358 (84.77%)	1,167 (94.96%)	670 (96.26%)
Croats	45 (6.912%)	14 (0.668%)	26 (1.623%)	25 (2.034%)	14 (2.011%)
Others	6 (0.922%)	16 (0.763%)	3 (0.187%)	8 (0.651%)	3 (0.431%)
Yugoslavs		61 (2.910%)	193 (12.050%)	18 (1.465%)	4 (0.575%)
Muslims/Bosniaks		6 (0.286%)	4 (0.250%)	11 (0.895%)	
Montenegrins			12 (0.749%)		5 (0.718%)
Albanians			6 (0.375%)		

== Sources ==
- Plećaš, Neđeljko; Dimitrijević, Bojan (2004). Ratne godine. Institut za savremenu istoriju. ISBN 9788674030912.
- Trgo, Fabijan, ed. (1964). Zbornik dokumenata i podataka o Narodno-oslobodilačkom ratu Jugoslovenskih naroda. Vol. V, 32.
