= Oštrelj =

Oštrelj Оштрељ
- Village
- Location within Serbia
- Coordinates: 44°04′08″N 22°09′37″E
- Country: Serbia
- District: Bor District
- Municipality: Bor

Population (2022)
  - Total: 523
- Time zone: UTC+1 (CET)
  - Summer (DST): UTC+2 (CEST)

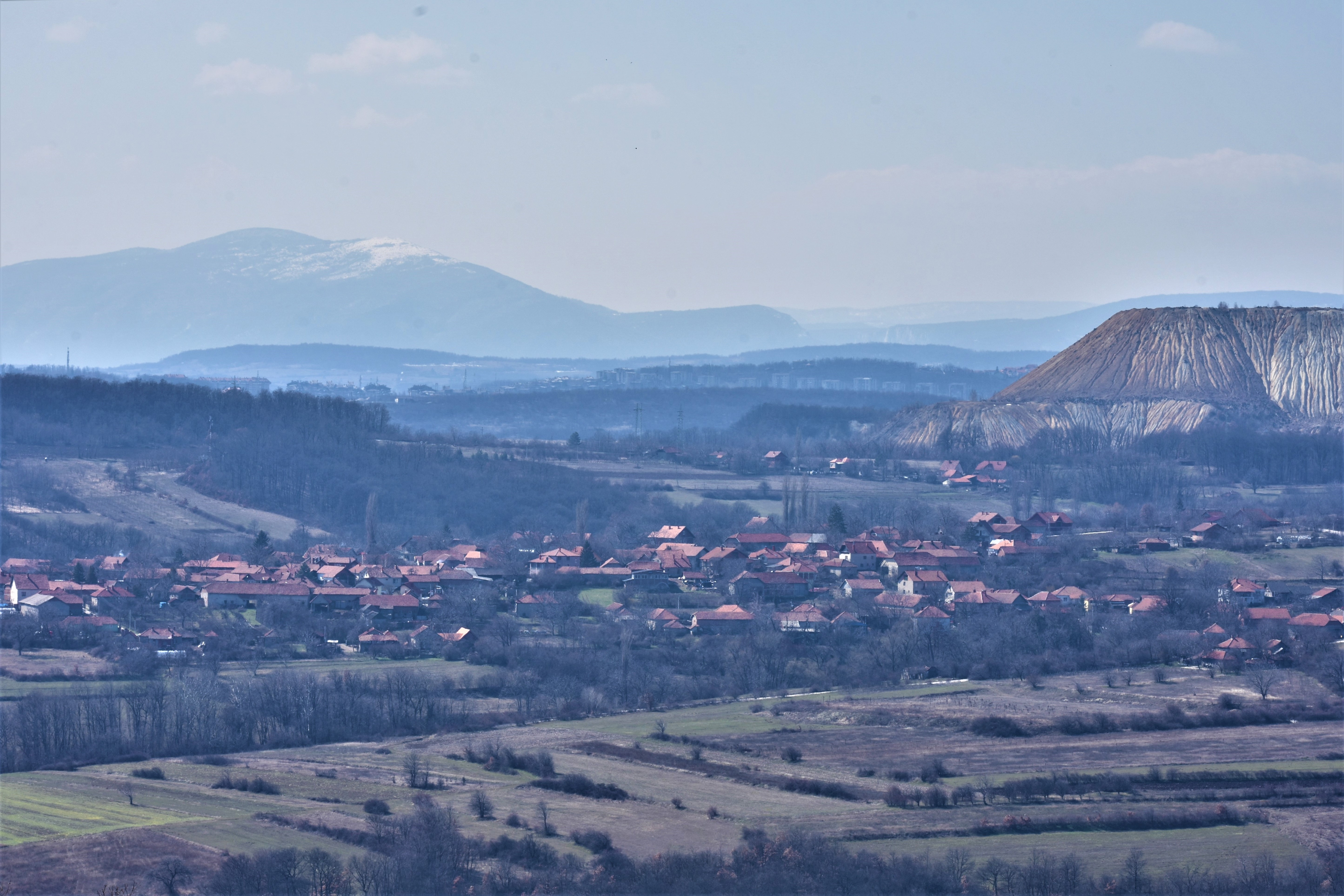

Oštrelj (Serbian Cyrillic: Оштрељ; Romanian: Oștreli) is a village in the municipality of Bor, Serbia. According to the 2022 census, the village has a population of 523 people.
