= Trubar, Bihać =

Trubar
- Village
- Location within Bosnia and Herzegovina
- Coordinates: 44.3452°N 16.263°E
- Country: Bosnia and Herzegovina
- Entity: Federation of Bosnia and Herzegovina
- Canton: Una-Sana
- Municipality: Bihać

Area
  - Total: 24.76 sq mi (64.12 km^{2})

Population (2013)
  - Total: 64
  - Density: 2.6/sq mi (1.0/km^{2})
- Time zone: UTC+1 (CET)
  - Summer (DST): UTC+2 (CEST)

Trubar is a village in the municipality of Bihać, Bosnia and Herzegovina. Previously it was village of Drvar, precisely after war in Bosnia and Hercegovina, it was decided with Dayton Agreement that this village among the others (Boboljusci, Bosanski Osredci, Gornji Tiškovac, Mali Cvjetnić, Malo Očijevo, Martin Brod, Očigrije, Palučci, Trubar, Veliki Cvjetnić and Veliko Očijevo) would become the part of Bihać. Trubar is also known for Golub Babic. Today, even though it is 21st century, a lot of remaining population still doesn't have electricity and the road is so bad that you can't go there with regular car, it's like the village is cut from civilisation.

== Demographics ==
According to the 2013 census, its population was 64.

Ethnicity in 2013
Ethnicity	Number	Percentage
Serbs	63	98.4%
Croats	1	1.6%
Total	64	100%
