= Chetnik war crimes in World War II =

War crimes and genocide during World War II in Yugoslavia

- Part of the World War II in Yugoslavia
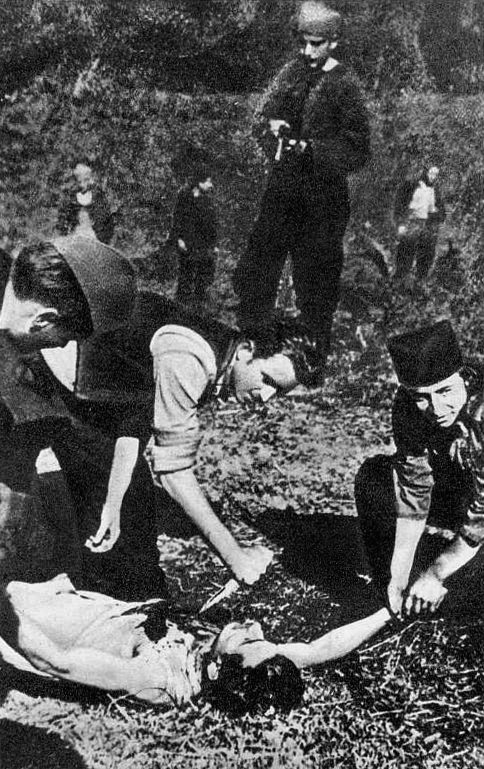
- Location: Kingdom of Yugoslavia
- Date: 1941–1945
- Target: Muslims, Croats, Yugoslav Partisan POWs and sympathisers, and Jews (after 1942)
- Attack type: Genocide, ethnic cleansing, massacres
- Deaths: Croatia and Bosnia and Herzegovina: 50,000–100,000; Sandžak: over 5,000
- Perpetrators: Chetniks; Fascist Italy (1941–1943)
- Motive: Greater Serbia; Islamophobia; Anti-Croat sentiment Anti-communism; Antisemitism; Anti-Catholicism; Reprisal

The Chetniks, a Yugoslav royalist and Serbian nationalist movement and guerrilla force, committed numerous war crimes during the Second World War, primarily directed against the non-Serb population of the Kingdom of Yugoslavia, mainly Muslims and Croats, and against Communist-led Yugoslav Partisans and their supporters. Most historians who have considered the question regard the Chetnik crimes against Muslims and Croats during this period as constituting genocide.

The Chetnik movement drew its members from the interwar Chetnik Association and various Serb nationalist groups. Some Chetnik ideologues were inspired by the Stevan Moljević's Homogeneous Serbia memorandum in July 1941, that defined the borders of an ethnically pure Greater Serbia. A similar document was put forward to the Yugoslav government-in-exile in September 1941. The Yugoslav government embraced the Chetniks and their basic ideas, which were already a part of the political framework of pre-war Yugoslavia. A December 1941 directive, attributed to Chetnik leader Draža Mihailović, explicitly ordered the ethnic cleansing of Muslims and Croats from Sandžak and Bosnia and Herzegovina. One of the chief Chetnik ideologues, Dragiša Vasić, argued in May 1942 that population transfers and deportations should be carried out in the postwar period.

From the start of the war, the Chetniks expelled Muslims and Croats from areas they controlled, and engaged in mass killings. In late 1941, they connected with various independent pro-Chetnik groups that participated in revolts against the Ustaše-led Independent State of Croatia (NDH). With fascist Italy's help, the Chetniks established a form of civil and military government in large parts of eastern Bosnia, which was followed by discriminatory measures and systematic massacres of non-Serbs in the region. The Chetnik genocidal campaign reached a peak between October 1942 and February 1943. Military defeats and the loss of Allied support compelled the Chetniks to moderate their policy towards Croats and Muslims. Despite these efforts, massacres of civilians continued until the end of the war. The terror tactics against the Croats were, to at least an extent, a reaction to the terror carried out by the Ustaše; however, the largest Chetnik massacres took place in eastern Bosnia where they preceded any significant Ustaše operations. Croats and Bosniaks living in areas intended to be part of Greater Serbia were to be cleansed of non-Serbs regardless, in accordance with Mihailović's directive of 20 December 1941.

Estimates of the number of deaths caused by the Chetniks in Croatia and Bosnia and Herzegovina range from 50,000 to 68,000 Muslims and Croats. For the region of Sandžak, more than 5,000 victims are registered. About 300 villages and small towns were destroyed, along with a large number of mosques and Catholic churches. In 1946, Dragoljub Mihailović was convicted of war crimes and high treason, and was executed with nine other Chetnik commanders.

== Background ==
=== Interwar period ===
During the interwar period in the Kingdom of Yugoslavia, veterans of Serbian guerilla units known as the Chetniks were split into different organizations, depending on their affiliation to the Democratic Party or the People's Radical Party. Organizations aligned to the Radical Party promoted the idea of a Greater Serbia. The leader of one such organization was Puniša Račić, who in 1928 killed two deputies of the Croatian Peasant Party (HSS) and mortally wounded its president, Stjepan Radić, in the Yugoslav Parliament. These organizations were dissolved following the imposition of royal dictatorship by King Alexander in 1929, and most of their members moved to the original "Chetnik Association for Freedom and Honor of the Fatherland" that continued to function. In 1932, Kosta Pećanac became the president of the Chetnik Association. As president, he transformed it into an aggressively partisan Serb political organisation and allowed entry to non-veterans. By 1938, the membership increased to around 500,000.

Chetnik Association subcommittees were established throughout Bosnia and Herzegovina, particularly in eastern Bosnia, in territories they envisioned in a future expanded Serbia. Subcommittees were also formed in Croatia, mostly in areas inhabited by Serbs. They acted as semi-military organizations and were involved in violent activities throughout the 1930s, including murders. Croat and Slovene opposition to the Chetnik Association led to its prohibition in Banovinas with an ethnic Croat and Slovene majority. Some of its sections continued to operate in those regions in the following years, on a reduced scale. The Chetnik subcommittees and organizations with a similar program opposed the formation of the autonomous Banovina of Croatia, that was negotiated in August 1939 under the Cvetković–Maček Agreement by Croatian and Serbian political leaders. They called for the creation of the Banovina of Serbia, with parts of Bosnia and Herzegovina and the Dalmatian coast that were included in the Croatian Banovina. Headed by the Serbian Cultural Club group, a movement called "Serbs united" (Srbi na okup) was formed, which claimed that the position of Serbs in the Banovina of Croatia was endangered. Pro-Chetnik organizations were active in the movement's work. Despite its activities, including a petition for the secession of Serb-majority districts, the movement did not receive widespread support among Serbs in Croatia. In the 1940 Croatian local elections, parties and lists supported by the movement performed poorly compared to the largely-Serb Independent Democratic Party, a member of the governing coalition together with the HSS. In 1941, there were around 300 Chetnik and similar organizations in Bosnia and Herzegovina and around 200 in Croatia.

=== World War II ===
On 6 April 1941, Nazi Germany, Italy, and Hungary invaded Yugoslavia. Yugoslavia capitulated on 17 April, and the country was partitioned by the Axis powers. In northern Bosnia, a group of officers and soldiers of the Royal Yugoslav Army, led by Colonel Draža Mihailović, refused to surrender and took to the hills. They moved to Ravna Gora in Serbia where they set up their headquarters. While they did not originate from interwar Chetnik organizations, upon establishing a command post, they designated themselves as the "Chetnik Detachments of the Yugoslav Army". Their name was later changed to "Yugoslav Army in the Fatherland", but were commonly known as the Chetniks. Pećanac also raised guerrilla units, but did not engage the Axis forces, and reached agreements in August with both the Serbian puppet government and the German authorities. His forces did not cooperate with Mihailović.

Mihailović undertook a military and political structuring of the movement. In August 1941, he formed the Chetnik National Committee as an advisory body. It included former politicians and members of organizations such as the Serbian Cultural Club, with a Greater Serbian ideological orientation. Outside Serbia, various independent groups were formed that shared the same ideology as the Chetniks. These groups took part in armed uprisings against the Ustashe-led Independent State of Croatia (NDH), an axis puppet state established in occupied Yugoslavia, in the summer of 1941. The uprisings were a reaction to the genocidal policy implemented by the Ustashas against Serbs. Mihailović sought to assume command of the insurgents and integrate them in the Chetnik movement. In the first months of the war, the Chetniks cooperated in their anti-Axis activities with the communist-led Yugoslav Partisans under Josip Broz Tito, with whom they later came into conflict.

In September, Mihailović made first contacts with the Yugoslav government-in-exile, which embraced the Chetnik movement and its main objectives as a basis of post-war Yugoslavia. The Serbian-dominated regime in Yugoslavia promoted Greater Serbian and anti-Croat policies in the interwar period.

== Genocide of Muslims and Croats ==
=== Ethnic cleansing plans ===
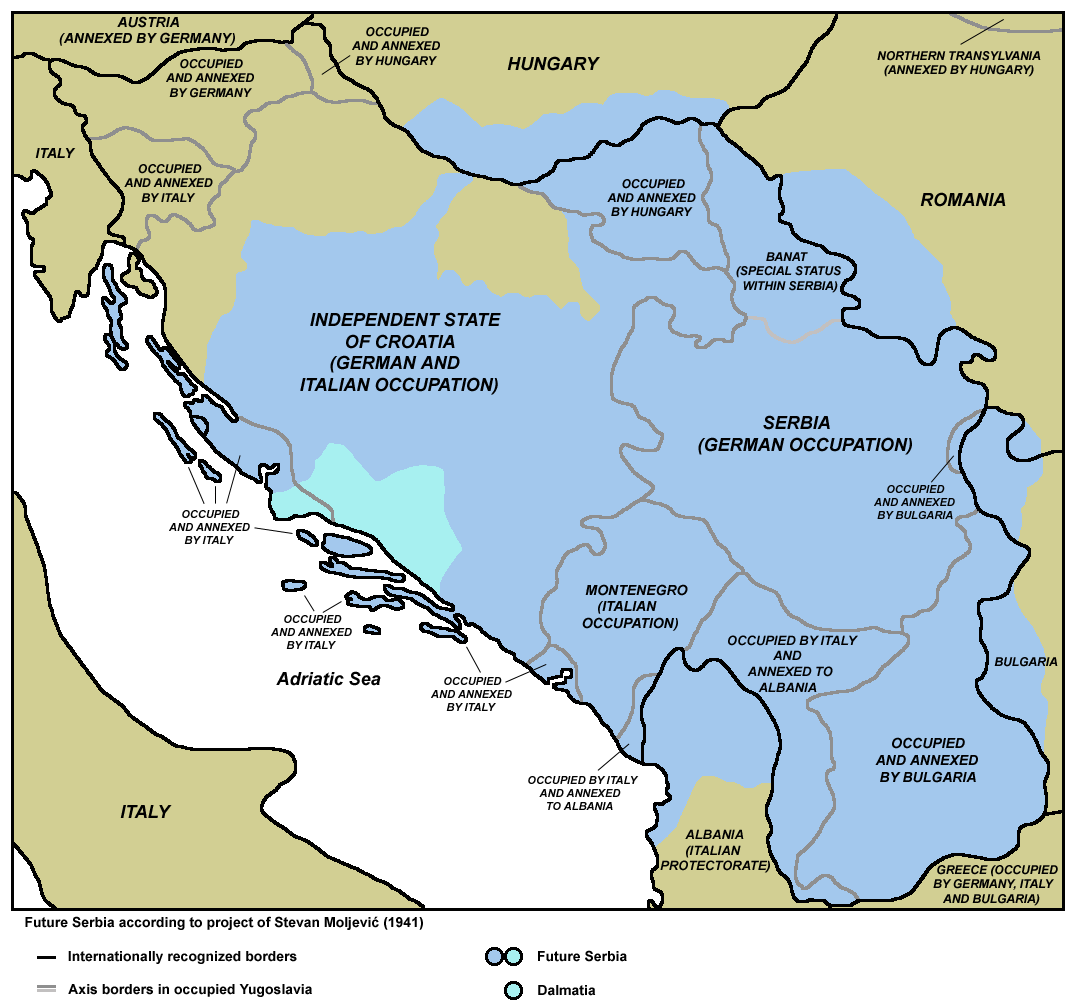
Stevan Moljević's Homogeneous Serbia

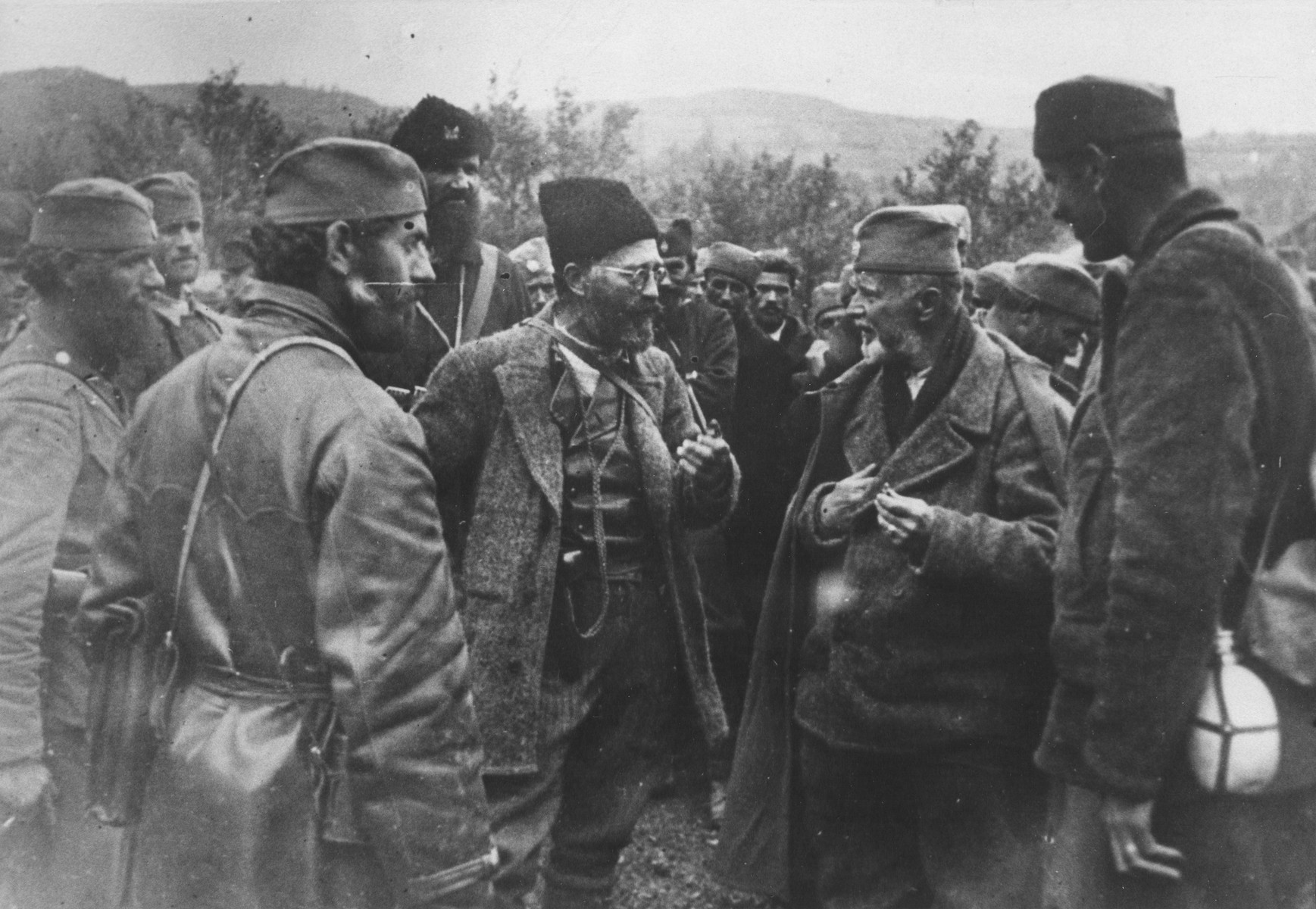
Chetnik ideologue Dragiša Vasić (second from right) speaking with Draža Mihailović and other Chetniks.

Chetnik ideology encompassed the notion of Greater Serbia, to be achieved through the ethnic cleansing of Muslims and Croats in order to create ethnically homogeneous areas. The majority of documents of the Chetnik leadership emphasized "cleansing", "resettling", or "moving" of non-Serb populations, as well as the executions of "traitors", which turned into mass killings of Croats and Muslims. In at least one document, the total destruction of ethnic groups was mentioned, that "Muslims from Bosnia, Herzegovina and Croatia should be liquidated." After the war, the Chetniks, as an instrument of the Yugoslav government-in-exile, planned on imposing a dictatorship to carry out their objectives.

On 30 June 1941, Stevan Moljević, an attorney and member of the Serbian Cultural Club, wrote the Homogeneous Serbia memorandum, calling for the creation of a Greater Serbia and its ethnic cleansing of the non-Serb population. Two months later, he became a member of the Chetnik National Committee. In a letter to Chetnik ideologue Dragiša Vasić in December 1941, he repeated his ideas and proposed "cleansing the land of all non-Serb elements". In another letter to Vasić in February 1942, he noted: "then from inside, the cleansing of the country of all non-Serb elements should be carried out. The miscreants should be punished on the spot, and for the remainder the road should be opened: for the Croats to Croatia and for the Muslims to Turkey (or Albania)." These tendencies were confirmed and elaborated in later documents.

Historian Mark Levin suggested that there is no evidence that the massacres committed by the Chetniks are a direct consequence of Moljević's writings. Moljević's discourse was similar to the one formulated by the Belgrade Chetnik Committee and presented to the Yugoslav government-in-exile in September 1941. The program was divided into four parts. Under article II, Mihajlović proposed a plan for the postwar period:

- to punish all those who in a criminal way have served the enemy and who willingly had been working for the annihilation of the Serbian people;
- to draw the "de facto" borders of the Serbian lands and make so that only Serbian inhabitants remain in them;
- to pay particular attention to the fast and radical cleansing of the towns and their filling with fresh Serbian elements;
- to prepare a plan for the cleansing or moving of the peasant population in order to achieve the goal of homogeneity of the Serbian state community;
- in the Serbian community, to pay attention to the question of the Muslims in particular and solve it in this phase.

A map was made on the basis of the plan, in which specific figures in regard to population shifts were set forth. It was projected that 2,675,000 people had to be expelled from the borders of Greater Serbia, including 1,000,000 Croats and 500,000 Germans. The plan also included the population transfer of Serbs located outside those borders. No specific figures were given for Muslims. A written memorandum with Mihailović's signature, dated 20 December 1941, to newly appointed commanders in Montenegro, Đorđije Lašić, and Pavle Đurišić, outlined the Chetnik goals:

1. The struggle for the liberty of our whole nation under the scepter of His Majesty King Peter II;
2. the creation of a Great Yugoslavia and within it of a Great Serbia which is to be ethnically pure and is to include Serbia, Montenegro, Bosnia and Herzegovina, Syrmia, Banat, and Bačka;
3. the struggle for the inclusion into Yugoslavia of all still unliberated Slovene territories under the Italians and Germans (Trieste, Gorizia, Istria, and Carinthia) as well as Bulgaria, and northern Albania with Skadar;
4. the cleansing of the state territory of all national minorities and a-national elements;
5. the creation of contiguous frontiers between Serbia and Montenegro, as well as between Serbia and Slovenia by cleansing the Muslim population from Sandžak and the Muslim and Croat populations from Bosnia and Herzegovina.

— Directive of 20 December 1941

While the document's origin and its connection with Mihailović is disputed, it shows how the basic goal of the Chetniks was to be achieved. A March 1942 document from the Chetnik Dinara Division, active in northern Dalmatia, closely followed the December 1941 memorandum. The document called for the creation of a Greater Serbia with an exclusively Serb population, and the cleansing of Dalmatia, Lika, Bosnia, and Herzegovina of Croats and Muslims.

In a letter from May 1942, Vasić hailed Moljević's writing as a very interesting idea. Vasić argued that "the question of a homogeneous Serbia, which will have to include all areas in which Serbs live today, is beyond discussion." He noted that the Chetniks lacked the strength to carry out the planned ethnic cleansing during the war, and concluded that it should be done in the years following the war's end: "Consequently, if we are wise, this question of cleansing or resettling and exchanging of populations will not be that difficult." Mihailović's diary from spring 1942 reads: "The Muslim population has through its behaviour arrived at the situation where our people no longer wish to have them in our midst. It is necessary already now to prepare their exodus to Turkey or anywhere else outside our borders." A Chetnik manual from December 1942 discussed the "revenge" against Croats at the end of the war and in its aftermath: "One should not fear that the retribution executed in this manner would not be complete as far as the number of executed is concerned. If there are not more, then there are at least as many Frankovci and members of a certain intelligentsia, as there were Serbs who were killed."

A 13 February 1943 letter from the commander of the Ozren Chetnik Corps, sent to the commander of the Zenica Chetnik detachment, referred to the December 1941 instructions:

Perhaps these goals appear great and unachievable to you and your combatants. Remember the great battles for liberty under the leadership of Karađorđe. Serbia was filled with Turks (Muslims). In Belgrade and other Serbian towns, Muslim minarets were prominent and Turks performed their foul-smelling cleansing in front of mosques as they are now doing in Serbian Bosnia and Herzegovina. At that time our homeland was overflowing with hundreds of thousands of Muslims. Walk through Serbia today. You will not find a Turk (Muslim) anywhere, you will not even find even one of their graves, nor even one Muslim grave stone (...) This is the best proof and greatest guarantee that we will succeed in today's holy battle and that we will exterminate every Turk from these, our Serbian lands. Not one Muslim will remain among us (...) Peasants and other "little" people will be moved to Turkey. Our government in London, using the English allied and benevolent government, will endeavor to gain the approval of the Turkish government with respect to this (...) All Catholics who sinned against our people in our tragic days, as well as all intellectuals and those well off, will be destroyed without mercy. We will spare the peasant people as well as the low working class and make real Serbians of them. We will convert them into Orthodox by hook or by crook. There, those are the goals of our great battle and when the crucial moment arrives, they will be achieved. We have already achieved them in some parts of our homeland.

=== Summer 1941 uprisings ===
In June 1941, the Serbs started an uprising in eastern Herzegovina against the NDH, provoked by large-scale massacres perpetrated by the Ustashas. More uprisings followed during summer in parts of the NDH. Serb rebels in these revolts were in the first months a mixture of Communists and their sympathizers, and Serb nationalist groups. The leaders of those groups, among whom were former politicians, former officers of the Yugoslav Army, and Orthodox priests, were affiliated to pre-war nationalist organizations or local subcommittees of the Chetnik Association. In the first few months, most had little or no contact with the Chetnik leadership in Ravna Gora and acted independently. They advocated a struggle for Greater Serbia through exterminating, assimilating, or expelling non-Serbs, and were ready to conclude cooperation agreements with Italy. All Croats and Muslims were viewed as guilty for the crimes of the Ustashe regime.

The rebels captured large parts of Lika, northern Dalmatia, and southwestern Bosnia. Areas under their control were ethnically cleansed of Croats and Muslims, and many massacres were committed. On 28 June 1941, the village of Avtovac in eastern Herzegovina was captured by the rebels. The village was then looted and burned, and dozens of Muslim civilians were killed. During the Drvar uprising, on 27 July 350 Croats were killed after the capture of Drvar by the rebels. On the same day, more than 200 Croatian pilgrims were killed in the Trubar massacre near Drvar, including their priest, Waldemar Maximilian Nestor. Over 90 Croats were killed in the Bosansko Grahovo massacre. The rebels tortured a Catholic priest, Juraj Gospodnetić, and burned him alive in front of his mother. Houses in Bosansko Grahovo and in the surrounding villages of Obljaj, Korita, Luka, Ugarci, and Crni Lug were burned and over 250 Croat civilians were killed in these attacks. Some of the leaders of the Drvar uprising later had an important role in the Chetnik movement.

On 28 July, in the village of Brotnja in the municipality of Srb, 37 civilians (including 24 members of the Ivezić family) were massacred and their houses were looted and destroyed by the insurgents. Croats from Donji Lapac were forced to flee to the village of Boričevac, and from there most of them moved to Kulen Vakuf, in total more than 2,000 people. On 2 August, the rebels looted and burned Boričevac and killed all 55 civilians that remained in the village, mostly women and elderly. Croatian historian, Slavko Goldstein, mentioned that Chetniks killed as many as 179 civilians in Boričevac during the uprising.

Massacres at the end of July continued into August and September. In the Krnjeuša massacre in early August, at least 240 Croat civilians were killed by the rebels, mostly women, children, and elderly, and their houses were looted and burned. The local Catholic priest was tortured and burned alive. 70 Croat civilians were massacred in the neighboring village of Vrtoče, where civilians were decapitated and slaughtered with knives. On 26 August, between 200 and 300 Muslims were killed in the village of Berkovići in Herzegovina. In September, the rebels captured Kulen Vakuf. Around 2,000 Muslims and a smaller number of Croats (around 100) were killed in the Kulen Vakuf massacre. Victims of the massacres in Kulen Vakuf (which included hundreds of women and children) were shot, stabbed, hacked to death with axes and other farm tools, or drowned in the river Una. This was preceded by massacres of Serbs in the Kulen Vakuf region in a similar fashion in the previous months. In the same month, villages in Ravno and Stolac in Herzegovina were burned and looted by the rebels. On 3 September, Chetniks killed 425 Muslims from several villages in the Plana district, near Bileća. Most of the bodies were thrown into the Čavkarica pit, some of whom were still alive.

Around 50,000 Croats and Muslims fled from rebel-controlled areas. The NDH lacked the forces to suppress the rebels and reluctantly agreed with Italy to bring its troops to the insurgent area. Italy used the uprisings to expand its influence and adopted a pro-Chetnik policy to destabilize the NDH. Many insurgent groups avoided conflict with the Italians and started collaborating with them. This led to a split among the rebels, as the Communists strongly opposed collaboration.

Upon hearing about the uprisings, Mihailović sent his emissaries to assume control of ideologically close groups. In mid-August 1941, Mihailović sent Chetnik commanders Boško Todorović and Jezdimir Dangić to eastern Bosnia. He also sent emissaries to the rest of Bosnia and Herzegovina, Montenegro, and Croatia. Leaders of all groups that presented themselves as Serbian nationalist at least formally accepted Mihailović as their supreme commander.

=== Provisional Administration of East Bosnia ===
Under the command of Dangić, the Chetniks engaged in the robbing, beating, and occasional killing of Muslim civilians in eastern Bosnia during September. According to historian Enver Redžić, the Chetniks themselves along with some historians labeled the crimes and atrocities against Muslims and Croats as revenge for Ustasha terror and atrocities against the Serbian population. Historian Jozo Tomasevich states that the terror tactics against the Croats were, to at least an extent, a reaction to the terror carried out by the Ustaše, while historian Marko Attila Hoare claims that the largest Chetnik massacres took place in eastern Bosnia where they preceded any significant Ustashe operations. Croats and Bosniaks living in areas intended to be part of Greater Serbia were to be cleansed of non-Serbs regardless, in accordance with Mihailović's directive of 20 December 1941. In the village of Novo Selo, Muslim civilians were killed and the village was burned and looted. Muslim houses were also burned and looted following the capture of Rogatica in October, many Muslims were also killed and expelled from the town. By January 1942, Chetniks killed around 2,000 people from the Rogatica district. In December 1941, Chetniks from the Serb village of Kravica – armed with guns, knives, hammers, sticks, and axes – massacred 86 Muslim civilians in Sopotnik (near Drinjača). In the village of Zaklopača, east of Vlasenica, the Chetniks barricaded a group of Muslims in a local Muslim religious school, which was then set alight, killing eighty-one people.

Todorović established contacts with the Italians and negotiated the transfer of control of parts of eastern Bosnia, the Foča, Goražde, and Višegrad districts, to the Chetniks in November 1941. The Italians compelled the NDH authorities to withdraw from these areas, and then turned it over to the Chetniks, who established their own civil and military government called "Provisional Administration of East Bosnia". Upon taking control of the area, the Chetniks engaged in systematic massacres and plunder of the Muslim population. The Chetnik Provisional Administration enacted discriminatory measures against the Muslims and Croats of Foča. Businesses and shops were looted, all houses had to be unlocked at all times, and everyone aged 16–60 had to report to the Provisional Administration. The citizens needed a special permission to leave their homes, and those with a permission were obliged to wear a badge similar to the Jewish Yellow badge. More than 2,000 civilians were massacred in Foča between December 1941 and January 1942. At the same time, the Chetniks captured Goražde after a long siege ended, on 1 December. Dangić gave a speech in Goražde, made references to a Greater Serbia, and concluded that "we cannot be together anymore, we and the balije [a vulgar term used against Bosniaks as well as those that identified as Muslims within the Balkans]." After the speech ended, his forces went on a looting, raping, and killing spree. Many of the victims were murdered on the town's bridge, and their bodies were dumped into the Drina River. It is estimated that several hundred civilians were killed in the town. Paul Mojzes cites that 1,370 Muslims and Croats were killed in Goražde during these massacres, from 30 December 1941 until 26 January 1942. Others cite that as many as 2,050 Muslims and Croats, or about 20% of the town's population, were killed during this period. Vladimir Dedijer and Antun Miletić cite 5,000 Muslim men, women and children from Goražde and Foča who were killed between late-1941 and the beginning of 1942, as reprisals for killings of Serb inhabitants by Muslim Ustaše militia. The killings in Goražde also culminated with the abduction and murder of five Catholic nuns of various nationalities. Between 2,000 and 3,000 Muslims were massacred by Chetniks in Vlasenica, from December 1941 until February 1942. The genocidal policy of the Chetniks in eastern Bosnia preceded any significant genocidal campaigns by the Ustaše, which began in the spring of 1942.

Massacres continued in the following months in the region. In December 1941, Chetniks massacred 418 Muslims in the town of Čajniče and 423 Muslims in the village of Divin. In the village of Žepa about three hundred were killed in late 1941. In early January 1942, the Chetniks massacred fifty-four Muslims in Čelebić and burned down the village. In the same month, the Chetniks entered Srebrenica and killed around a thousand Muslim civilians in the town and in nearby villages. Thousands more were killed in Višegrad. An eyewitness of the massacres in Višegrad said: "During those days, we saw how the Drina carried six, four and most frequently two [victims] who had been tied together and had their throats slit. These were, as I told you, only the first victims and the refugees say that there are many more in the countryside, for instance in the forest, creeks, etc."

On 26 January, Todorović reported back to Mihailović on the progress of negotiations with the Italians. He argued that the "Serbian question" should be resolved by the "evacuation, eradication and forced relocation of a significant number of the Muslims and Catholics." He claimed that the "Turks" were hostile to the Chetniks and were burning Serb villages, and reported that his Chetniks had burned a number of "Turkish" villages in the Herzegovina region. On 3 March, a contingent of Chetniks burned forty-two Muslim villagers to death in Drakan in the Višegrad area.

=== Actions in other regions ===
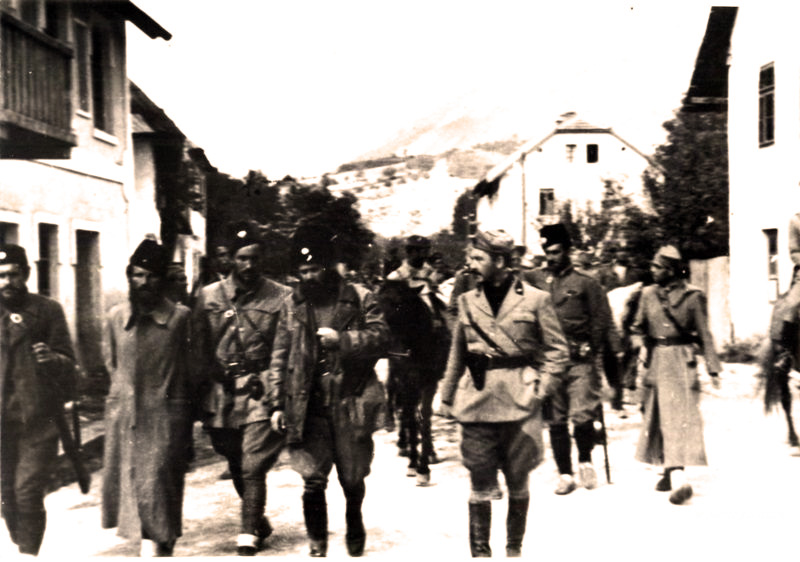
Chetniks and Italian forces in Prozor during Operation Alfa in 1942

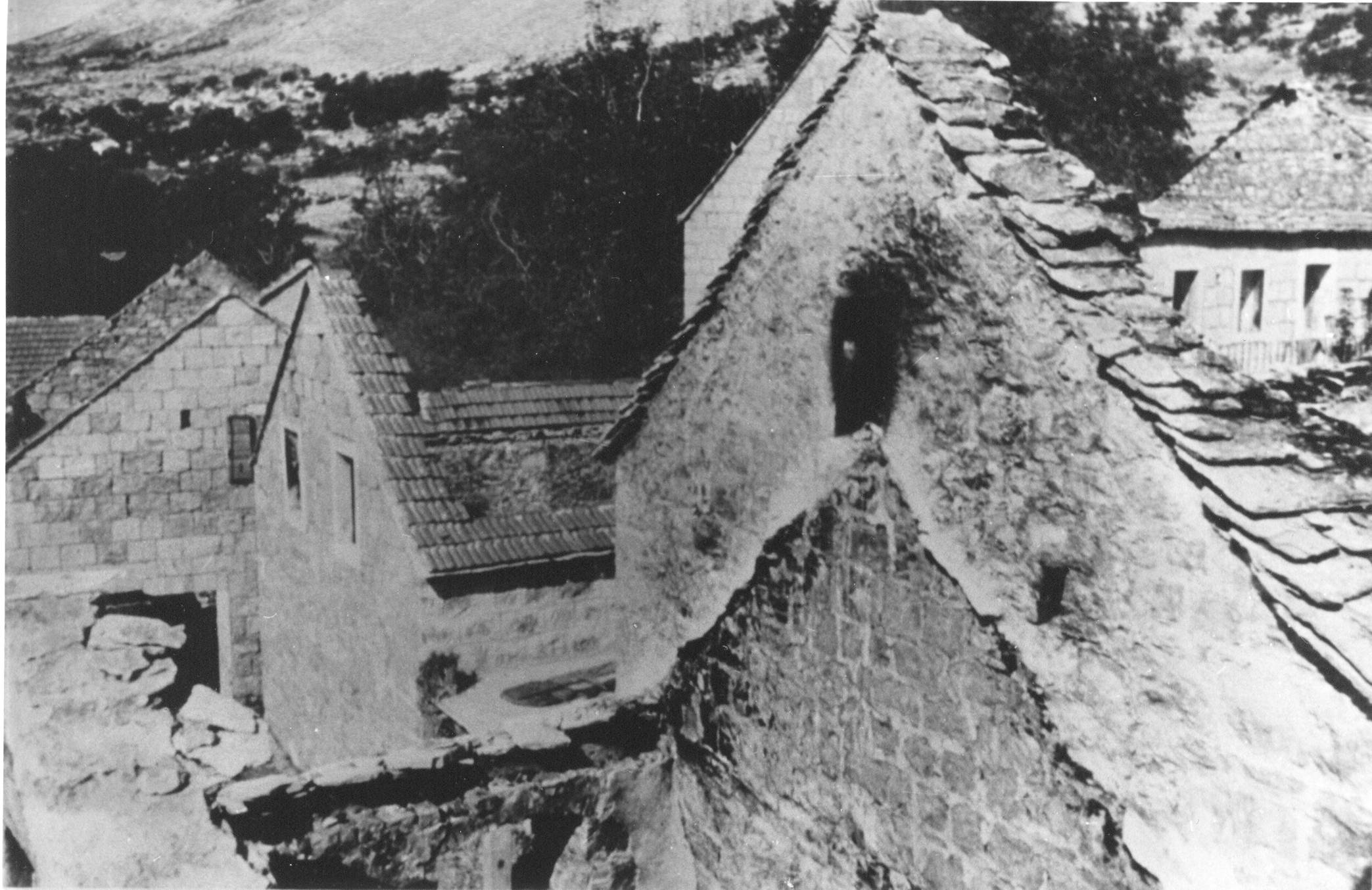
Destruction after the Gata massacre

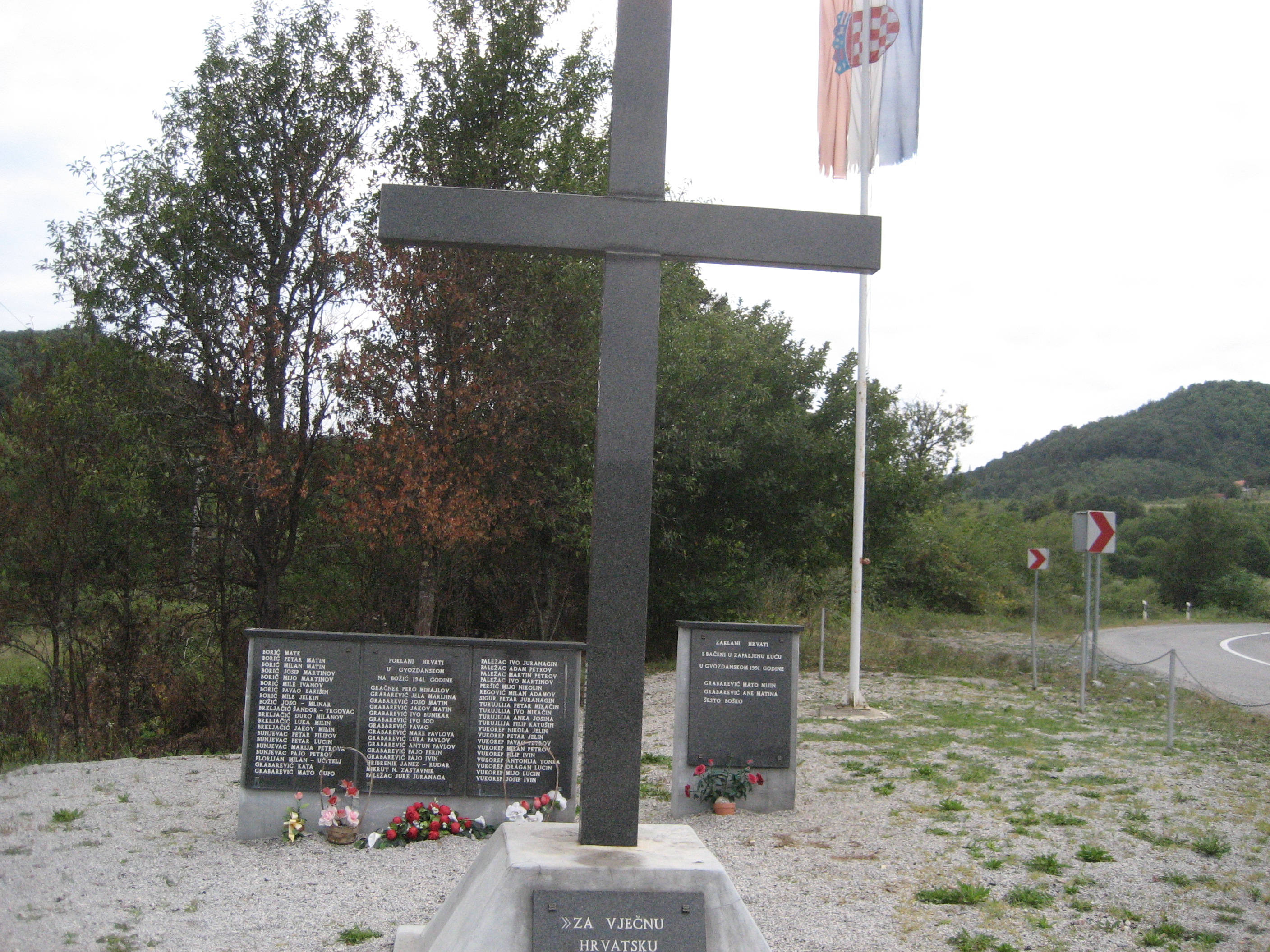
Monument to the Croatian Victims of the 1941 Chetnik Massacre in Gvozdansko

Independent Chetnik units were already organized in Lika, western Bosnia, and northern Dalmatia, when Mihailović's emissary reached the area in mid-January 1942. The units were formed after separating from the initial insurgent forces in the summer and early fall of 1941. Collaboration with Italian forces accelerated their growth. One of their leaders was Momčilo Đujić, a Serbian Orthodox Priest, whose forces were killing Croat civilians as early as April.

In Bosansko Grahovo, under local warlord Branko Bogunović, who operated under Đujić's command and with Italian protection, the town became a Chetnik stronghold. Local Croats were threatened and killed, and Bogunović obstructed the return of refugees that were in November 1941 given Italian permission to move back to the town. Around the same time, while visiting the village of Kninsko Polje, Bogunović said: "There is no salvation for the Croats, and there is no need for them to run because they cannot escape, there is no Croatian state, nor will it be, and all Croats need to be slaughtered." To gather all independent units in western parts of occupied-Yugoslavia, the Dinara Division was formed with Momčilo Đujić as its commander. It was until the end of the war the most important Chetnik force in the region.

During a June 1942 conference of Chetniks in the Manjača region in Bosanska Krajina, local commander Vukašin Marčetić declared his hope that "Bosnia will be cleansed from everything that is not Serb." In July, they organized a rally in the town of Trebinje in eastern Herzegovina, in which they boasted that "East Bosnia today is more ours than it has ever been. The Drina is today less of a border than it has ever been. There are no longer any Croats there, except a few unhappy Muslims in the towns." Chetnik commander Milan Šantić said in Trebinje: "The Serb lands must be cleansed from Catholics and Muslims. They will be populated by Serbs only. The cleansing will be done thoroughly. We shall push them all and destroy them without exceptions and without mercy. That shall be the starting point of our liberation. That must be done very quickly and with a revolutionary fervour."

More massacres in the area of Foča occurred in August 1942. With Italian approval, the Chetniks attacked the Ustashe-held town of Foča and captured it. Around 3,000 Muslim civilians were killed. Following the massacre, Chetnik commander Dobroslav Jevđević issued a proclamation to the Muslims that they "have no other choice but to finally and definitely accept Serb nationality", and added that "all the lands in which the Muslims live will indisputably and inviolably become part of the Serb state entity." In that same area, in a field near Ustikolina and Jahorina in eastern Bosnia, the Chetniks of Baćović and Zaharije Ostojić massacred about 2,500 Muslims and burned a number of villages. Baćović also killed a number of Partisan sympathizers elsewhere.

Under the command of Petar Baćović, the Chetniks participated in the Italian Operation Albia around Biokovo in late August. During the operation, the Chetniks massacred around 160 Croats in the Cetina region. Baćović described their activities during Operation Albia and spoke openly of their efforts to exterminate or cleanse the Croat and Muslim populations, and cited examples of burning of villages and killing of civilians in the area of Ljubuški and Imotski. He mentioned that "Our Chetniks have killed all men aged fifteen years or above", and that three Catholic priests were skinned alive in northern Dalmatia. That same month, both Chetniks and Italian forces destroyed and massacred several Croatian villages, (Dragljane, Zavojane, Vlaka and Kozice) between Vrgorac and Split, killing 150 Croat civilians; victims of these killings had their throats slit, were burned alive or impaled.

In the area of Makarska in south Dalmatia, in September, Baćović's forces destroyed another 17 Croatian villages and killed 900 Croats.

From May until September, on the basis of an agreement with Italian authorities, Chetnik units took over power in areas of eastern Herzegovina (with the exception of the towns). Subsequently, hundreds of Croats and Muslims were killed and thousands were expelled, approximately 28,000 Croats and Muslims were expelled or displaced from the Stolac region alone. Chetnik reports later stated that not a single Croat or Muslim remained in the areas under their control.

=== Peak of terror tactics ===
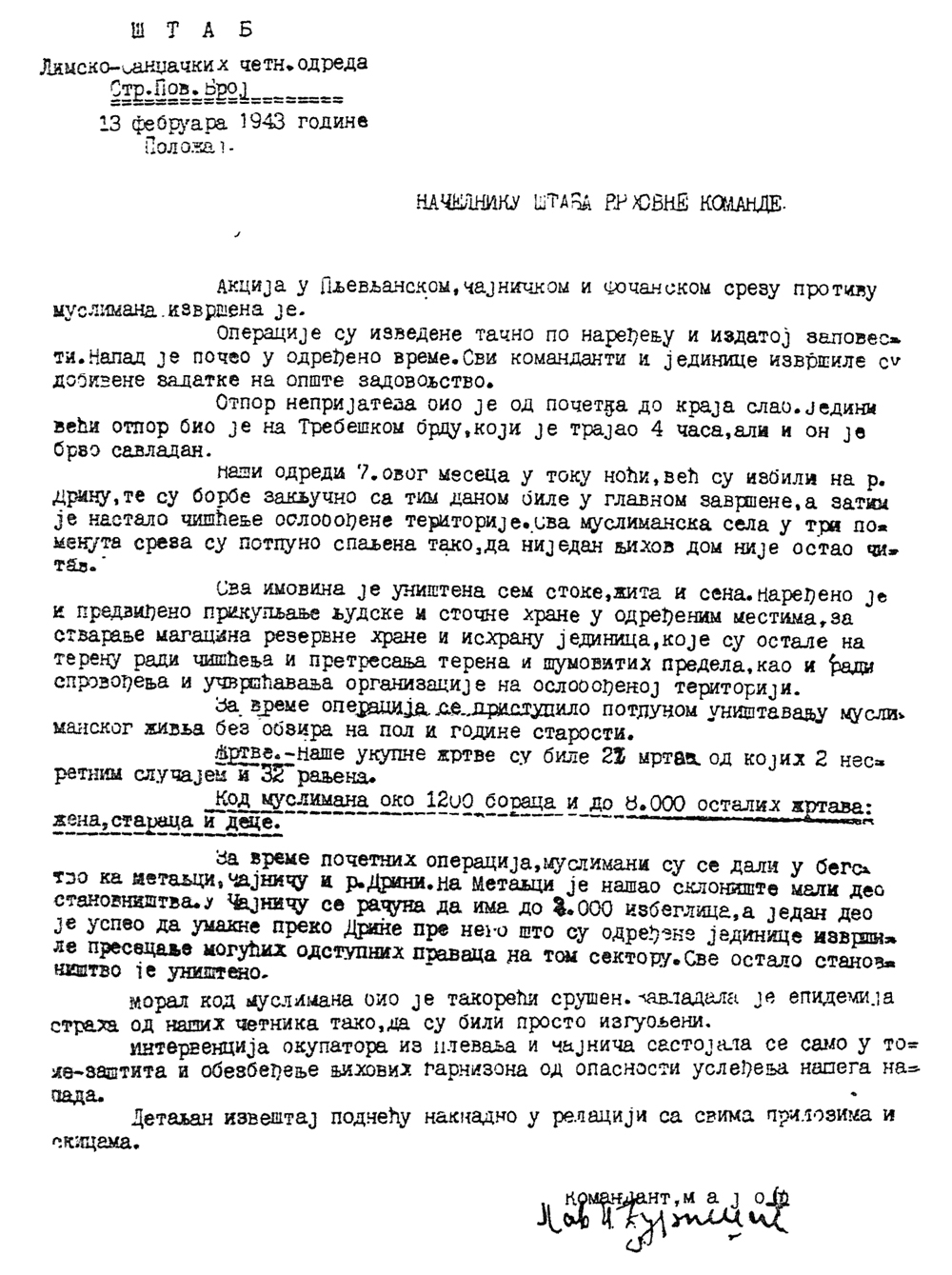
Đurišić's report of 13 February 1943, detailing the massacres of Muslims in the counties of Čajniče and Foča in southeastern Bosnia and in the county of Pljevlja in Sandžak

In October 1942, under the command of Petar Baćović and Dobroslav Jevđević, the Chetniks participated in the Italian Operation Alfa against the Partisans in the Prozor area. Chetnik forces massacred Croats and Muslims and burnt numerous villages in Prozor, before they were ordered by the Italians to leave the area on the insistence of the NDH government. The historian Jozo Tomasevich places the number of killed at over five hundred. Ivo Goldstein estimates 1,500 total deaths and attributes the discrepancy "due to the fact that the estimates refer to different territories." The historians Antun Miletić and Vladimir Dedijer estimated the number of killed at 2,500. Baćović reported to Mihailović that "in operations at Prozor, over 2,000 Šokci (Croats) and Muslims were killed. The soldiers returned delighted." The Partisan newspaper Borba reported that "about 2,000 souls" were "killed by the Chetniks in Croat and Muslim villages of Prozor, Konjic, and Vakuf" and "the districts of Prozor and Konjic have hundreds of slaughtered and murdered women and children as well as burnt houses." Another 200 Croats and Muslims were killed in the Mostar area, just prior to the massacres in Prozor. In the same month, over 100 inhabitants of the village of Gata near Split were massacred by the Chetniks of Mane Rokvić, and many houses were burned. Two days later, more massacres were carried out in the Dalmatian Hinterland. On 4 and 5 October 1942, Chetniks (supported by nearby Italian forces) killed 120 Croat civilians (mostly elderly, women and children) in Dugopolje and neighbouring settlements. Victims of these massacres were sadistically tortured and killed; burning people alive in buildings that had been set on fire, gouging out the eyes, smashing open skulls and cutting out people's hearts with knives. The local committee of the Communist Party of Croatia for Central Dalmatia reported on 4 October 1942:

[...] The Chetniks burned down the villages, plundered and slaughtered every person they could get their hands on. [...] The atrocities are difficult to describe. Anyone who failed to escape was killed. The women and girls were raped; her breasts cut off, as well as other parts of her body. Most of the people killed are elderly, but there are also many children. Many sick and helpless people burned to death in burning houses. The majority of those murdered were killed with knives and mostly had their throats cut. All kinds of scenes; a child in his mother's hands, both slaughtered. In some places large piles of murdered people, 10 to 15 bodies in the same place.

Ismet Popovac, the former mayor of Konjic, held that Muslim population should cooperate with the Chetniks against the Ustaše, as a way to protect themselves. He agreed with the Chetnik leadership to form a Muslim Chetnik militia. The Chetniks in eastern Herzegovina then concentrated their attacks on the Croat population. In November 1942, Popovac reported to Mihailović that, due to their cooperation in Herzegovina, "the Croat inhabitants, who were largely Ustasha-inclined, have been expelled. In that way, from Gabela to Mostar the entire left bank of the Neretva has been cleansed, and the number of refugees is estimated at 12,000 people."

In accordance with the Chetniks' Greater Serbia ideology, in November 1942, Ostojić was encouraged by Mihailović to wage a campaign of terror against the Muslim population living along the borders of Montenegro and the Sandžak, and subsequently reported that Chetniks had destroyed 21 villages and killed about 1,300 people.

Not long after this, the "March on Bosnia" offensive was planned for December 1942 as a campaign against the Partisans. Chetnik units in Montenegro were mobilized, but the offensive was postponed. Apart from attacking the Partisans, the offensive included a genocidal assault on the Muslim population. In January and February 1943, these units were given orders for "cleansing actions" against Muslims in Sandžak and in southeastern Bosnia. Chetnik Commander Pavle Đurišić, who led the operations, submitted a report to Mihailović in January that 33 Muslim villages were burned and 1,000 women and children killed. In February, Đurišić reported that around 8,000 women, children, and elderly were killed. The casualties would have been higher if a part of the local population had not fled to Sarajevo prior to the offensive. Đurišić emphasized that "during the operation the total destruction of the Muslim inhabitants was carried out regardless of sex and age". In the districts of Pljevlja, Čajniče, and Foča, "all Muslim villages [...] were totally burned so that not a single home remained in one piece." He noted that action should be taken to prevent the return of refugees. From 4–7 February 576 Muslim civilians (443 of whom were minors) were massacred in Bukovica, near Pljevlja. In March, 500 Muslim civilians were killed in the Goražde area. The course of cleansing actions of early 1943 indicate that they were a partial implementation of the December 1941 directive. Mihailović listed the Chetnik action in Sandžak as one of his successes, noting that they had "liquidated all Muslims in the villages except those in the small towns". In the Foča region, the Chetniks engaged in forced conversion of Muslims to Orthodoxy. An estimated 10,000 people were killed in the anti-Muslim operations commanded by Đurišić between January and February 1943. The casualty rate would have been higher if many Muslims had not already fled the area—most to Sarajevo—when the February action began. Bosniak historian, Šemso Tucaković, estimates that up to 20,000 Muslims may have been killed in the Podrinje area during the 1943 massacres.

The Partisan defeat of the Chetniks during the Battle of the Neretva, which routed the Chetnik forces from the Neretva and Drina rivers, largely ended this genocidal assault by March 1943. According to German verified data from the territory within their zone, in six east Bosnian and four central Bosnian districts, 8,400 Croats and 24,400 Muslims were killed by Chetnik forces, making a total of 32,800 people.

In some areas of Bosnia and Herzegovina, the Chetnik policy towards Muslims varied between open hostility and attempts to improve relations, similarly to the policy of NDH authorities towards Serbs. These appeals were met with limited success as they were often followed by more massacres. Đurišić threatened the Sandžak Muslims that "it is the last chance" for them to think about their fate and to go over to the Chetniks immediately, "because afterwards it will be too late." Zaharije Ostojić reported to Mihailović in January 1943 that the "Muslim question" should be resolved differently depending on the situation in a particular region. For the Sandžak Muslims, he held that they should be slaughtered before they could slaughter them. Ostojić worked with Popovac on enlisting Muslims in Chetnik ranks in other regions. He said that, regardless of these attempts, he is working "on a detailed plan for eradication of the Turks in the Čajniče district. This operation should take four days."

Đujić's and Baćović's forces were active in the Dalmatian Hinterland in January 1943. 33 people were executed in the Imotski district, and 103 in the area of Vrlika and its surroundings. Between 60 and 80 Croats were killed in the village of Maovice on 26 January 1943; victims were mostly slaughtered with knives or thrown alive into burning buildings. On 25 March 1943, Chetnik units of the Dinara Division were ordered to begin "cleansing [the area] of Croats and Muslims" and to create "one national corridor along the Dinara mountain for the connection of Herzegovina with Northern Dalmatia and Lika."

In April 1943, Đujić's Chetniks set up a prison and execution site in the village of Kosovo (today Biskupija), near Knin. Thousands of local civilians, (both Croats and even Serb Anti-Fascists) including women and children, as well as captured Partisans, were held and mistreated at this prison, while hundreds of prisoners (as many as over 1,000) were tortured and killed at an execution site near a ravine close to the camp.

=== Later stage of the war ===
The military defeats suffered at the hands of the Partisans in March and April 1943, German harsh measures, and the loss of influence in the government-in-exile, had a serious impact on Chetnik activities. To turn the situation around, the Chetniks tried to appeal to non-Serbs and enlist them into their ranks. Chetnik propaganda spoke of "brotherly love and cooperation" between the Muslims, Croats, and Serbs. Moljević spoke of "unity with the Muslims and Croats", but these actions had little effect. After the capitulation of Italy, the Germans opted for a more direct cooperation with the Chetniks.

The Chetnik terror tactics did not stop in the spring of 1943. Two Chetnik Corps' conducted an offensive in eastern Bosnia against the NDH forces in October 1943. Two thousand Muslim civilians were massacred after the capture of the town of Višegrad. Around a week later, the Chetniks captured the town of Rogatica. Most of its population fled earlier. The few remaining civilians were killed, and a large part of the town was burned. The offensive resulted in the flight of a large number of refugees to Sarajevo. The NDH authorities estimated that there were 100,000 refugees from eastern Bosnia. On 10 July 1943, Đujić Chetniks and members of the Italian "Bergamo Division" massacred more than 112 Croat civilians and captured Partisans in the village of Lovreć and surrounding areas. 24 of the civilian victims were burned alive in a single house.

Between 26–30 March 1944, Dinara Chetniks, alongside the 7th SS Division "Prinz Eugen" and the Ustaše 369th Infantry Division (under German command), massacred at least 1,525 Croat civilians during anti-Partisan reprisals across several villages in the Dalmatian Hinterland.

On 30 April 1944, Chetniks, in collaboration with the SS Police Regiment Bozen and local Italian Fascists, massacred 269 Croat civilians in village of Lipa, near Rijeka, of whom 121 were children between seven months and 15 years old.

Around fifty Muslims were massacred in Goražde in May 1944. Two mosques were set on fire. In June, at a gathering of Chetniks in Trnovo, the possibility of an Allied landing on the Adriatic coast was still resembled. It was concluded that, once it happens, "every Serb must with a weapon in his hand participate in the cleansing of everything that is not Serb."

In February, 27 Croats were killed in villages around Šibenik in Dalmatia. Nine more were killed in April, north of Šibenik, and 27 more in the area of Skradin in November. The Dinara Division was in December 1944 retreating to Slovenia through the Croatian Littoral. On their way, they looted villages, killed 33 civilians, and burnt the village of Bribir to the ground.

In the late stage of the war, many Chetniks joined the ranks of the Partisans, which did not stop war crimes, now as part of the Partisan struggle. Particularly in the Herzegovina region in 1945, a significant proportion of the local Partisan units were former Chetniks.

Religious figures were often key targets of Chetnik atrocities; 67 Imams and 52 Catholic priests were killed by Chetniks throughout the war. A number of Catholic nuns were also raped and killed, including the killing of several nuns from Goražde in December 1941. Members of the Croatian and Muslim cultural intelligentsia were also killed, such as Croatian essayist and author, Ivo Brnčić, killed near Vlasenica in May 1943 and famous Croatian poet and author, Ivan Goran Kovačić, who was killed near Foča in July 1943. One of Kovačić's most famous posthumous poems was "Jama" ("The Pit"), which condemned the Ustaše atrocities against Serbs.

== Crimes against Partisans ==
=== Prisoners of war ===
During the November 1941 uprising in Serbia, captured Yugoslav Partisans were handed over to the Nazis. General Dragoljub (Draža) Mihailović's staff surrendered 350 captured Partisans to the Nazis, who executed them. During the Chetnik-Partisan conflict in western Serbia, the Chetniks captured over one hundred Partisans. A group of approximately 500 prisoners, including Partisans captured in the towns of Gornji Milanovac, Kosjerić, Karan, and Planinica, were captured by Chetniks in the Ravna Gora mountain range.

Around 13 November 1941, Chetniks took a group of 365 prisoners to the town of Mionica and then to the village of Slovac. They were brought by Nazi and Serbian collaborationist forces to the city of Valjevo. The convoy was secured by Chetnik leader Jovan Škavović Škava. The meeting between Mihailović and the Nazis in the village of Divci preceded the Partisans' surrender. Of that group of prisoners, 263 were executed by the Nazis in Krušik, Valjevo, on 27 November 1941. Others were later executed, deported to concentration camps, or released.

Partisans were executed on a regular basis: "Captured 25 Partisans and killed 24 on the site" (Miloš Erkić, commander of the Tuzla Brigade of the 58th May Corps, to the commanders of the Sember and May brigades on 24 December 1943). Telegram no. 12.425 (No. 486) of 14 December 1943, from "He He" (Major Radoslav Đurić, commander of the Second Kosovo Corps) reported, "We broke the traitor Lieutenant Radulović and his group. Fighting was conducted by the Second Student Brigade in the village of Gumništa, where 21 Partisans and nine captives were killed."

According to the captive testimonies, Second Proletarian Division from Peko Dapčević's corps, which has three divisions, was here. This division consisted of the Second Dalmatian and Second Proletarian Divisions with around 800 people each, and the Forest Brigade with 400 (a total of 2,000). They had a lot of launchers and automatic weaponry, but little ammo. Eight of Keserović's Englishmen with Col. Seitz and a radio station joined them in Negbina. Their last portion is in Negbina and the majority in Klek. Many of their wounded died on the way. We captured 16 and slaughtered them without a court-martial.

— Telegram no. 1011 by Bi-Bi [Major Radomir Cvetić, commander of the Javor Corps]. No. 47, 21 January 1944.

The Bralenovice facility near Danilovgrad, which housed an orphanage before World War II, was used as a concentration camp for Partisans and civilians. The largest imprisonments occurred in April and May 1942. As Jakov N. Jovović wrote in letter number 8 to Bajo Stanišić on 30 May 1942, "489 people, ranging from one year to old men" were imprisoned in the camp. The number of prisoners was estimated at 610 in August 1942, and ranged between 700 and 1,000 at certain periods. It is estimated that Stanišić killed 426 Partisans between April 1942 and September 1943. Chetniks received cash rewards from the Nazis for the capture and execution of Montenegrin Partisans.

=== Medical personnel and patients ===
On 31 October 1941, Chetniks attacked the hospital of the Pomoravlje Partisan Detachment near the village of Ursule. This attack was part of the general attack by Nazi and Serb collaborationist units on the free Partisan territory of Levač. About ten nurses and fighters from the Levača Unit of the Pomoravlje Partisan Detachment were captured. All the prisoners were taken to Rekovac, redirected to Riljac and Ljubostinje and either killed, sent to concentration camps or escaped.

Chetniks attacked the Partisan hospital in the village of Gornja Gorevnica, captured eleven Partisans, and killed a nurse between 4 and 5 November 1941. The prisoners were taken to Brajići, where they were sentenced to death by a court-martial; the sentence was carried out on 5 November in Brajići.

The Chetniks slaughtered dozens of captured Partisans, including renowned Croatian poet Ivan Goran Kovačić, during the Operation Schwarz in June 1943. The 1st Mountain Division reported: "Captured 498, of which 411 were executed." In Cikota (eastern Bosnia) in mid-July, the Chetniks found 80 wounded Partisans from the First Proletarian Division, seized their weapons, and handed them to the Nazis. The Nazis killed them and burned their bodies.

That month, Chetniks found wounded Partisans from the First and Second Proletarian Brigades in Bišina and handed them over to the Nazis; the wounded Partisans were later executed. Chetnik Dragutin Keserović found a Partisan hospital in Jastrebac in May 1944, shooting 24 patients and four nurses. The Chetniks discovered another Partisan hospital in Semberija that month, killing about 300 seriously wounded patients. In Krčan, southeast of Udbina, about 90 seriously wounded Partisans were hiding in 16 houses. They initially hid in the basements with fifteen nurses for ten days after Operation Morgenstern, a joint anti-Partisan offensive of the Wehrmacht, NDH forces and Chetniks in Lika. The region held from 7 to 23 May 1944. Nurses, mostly members of the League of Communist Youth of Yugoslavia from surrounding villages, carried the wounded from the basements to Krčan. A group of Partisans guarded Trnova Poljana, protecting access to Krčan, Kuke, and Visuć from Lapac. Jovo Popović knew about Partisan posts, and brought Chetniks to the village by a roundabout route. They entered Krčan on 2 June 1944 at 10 am, and killed 36 wounded Partisans; women and old men hid 56 other wounded Partisans. Two doctors, a Croat Josip Kajfeš and an Italian named Suppa were killed, and Dr Finderle was wounded.

Aleksa Backović, Commissar of the 8th Kordun Division, was murdered in Obrad Radočaj's house by Popović. He was later praised by Momčilo Đujić, and received the Star of Obilić.

=== Suspected Partisan supporters ===
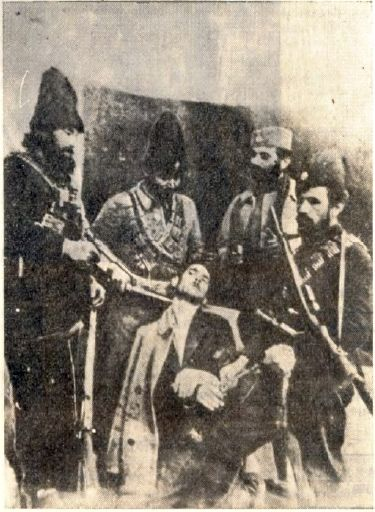
Another Chetnik group killing an unarmed civilian.

Chetniks terrorized civilians of all ethnicities suspected of supporting the Partisans, intimidating others to discourage Partisan support. A suspect's family was often tortured for supporting the Partisans.

In the summer of 1942, Montenegrin Chetniks, under the command of Blažo Đukanović, Bajo Stanišić and Pavle Đurišić (with the approval of Mihailović), cooperated fully with Italian forces during the period of anti-Partisan terror and reprisals against suspected collaborators, across large areas of occupied-Montenegro. As the Italian commanders were eager to reduce the commitment of their own forces, local Chetniks were given the authority to create what was essentially a parallel occupation and police force to supervise areas of the protectorate, independent of Italian control. To this end, Chetnik forces began a policy of "punishing" any civilian support for Partisan forces. Chetniks set up detention camps to detain suspected Partisan supporters and in June, Stanišić gave orders to shoot any peasants found guilty of supplying Partisans with food. In Nikšić, captured Partisans and their sympathisers were handed over to the Italians, where they were immediately executed.

I have ordered the destruction of entire families, the burning of homes and entire villages where the Partisans find their strongholds because some Serbian degenerates help the proletariat scum in some villages. This is what I ordered because we lose our best nationalists due to our own degenerates.

— Telegram no. 13.007 from Georgij (Lieutenant Colonel Milutin Radojević, Mihailović's delegate for the Jablanica and Toplice Area) No. SS 58, 28 December 1943

In late December 1943, Draža Mihailović ordered an anti-communist operation south of Belgrade. Colonel Jevrem Simić (general inspector of the Chetnik Detachments) and Nikola Kalabić (commander of the Chetnik Hill Guard Corps) were the main coordinators. After they signed a ceasefire-and-cooperation agreement with the Nazis in the region on 26 November 1943, Chetniks brought their units and began to clear the area.

All areas close to Belgrade are infested with communists and their supporters. I order commanders Major Mihail Jovanović, Captain Lazović, Captain Nikola Kalabić, Komarčević and the Mining Corps to be most energetic from south to north (...) in cleansing all srezs, especially Kosmaj. It is especially important to clear the srezs of Grocka and Umka. At the same time, I congratulate Captains Živojin Lazović and Nikola Kalabić. The decree was fulfilled on 1 December, and there will be further promotions for accomplishments. Continuously inform others about the actions taken.

— Mihailović's telegram to the commanders of Seged, Kiš (Živojin Lazović, commander of the Smederevo Corps), Ras-Ras (Nikola Kalabić), Dog-Dog and Romel

Mihailović's operation lasted from 20 to 21 December 1943. Members of the Smederevo Corps under the command of Živan Lazović killed 72 civilians, nine of whom were children from nine months to 12 years old. This became known as the Vranić Massacre. After the operation, Mihailović reported: "Terrible inactivity of the elders of Aval Corps. Živan Lazović must come so he could show what could be done."

In January 1943, under Komarčević's command, Chetniks killed 72 Partisan supporters in Posavina Srez. In December, Chetnik commander Živan Lazović killed 15 peasant Partisan supporters. That month, Chetniks under the command of Nikola Kalabić killed 21 peasants in Kopljare and, under the command of Vuk Kalaitović, shot 18 Partisan supporters in the town of Sjenica. Chetniks under the command of Sveto Bogičević entered Sepci, where they captured Sava Sremečević, Konstantin Vojinović, Ilija Radojević and Ilija Jovanović, in August 1944. After torturing them in an attempt to extract a confession of support for the Partisans, they killed all four.

== Crimes against Jews ==
According to Yad Vashem, the Chetniks initially had an ambivalent attitude towards Jews and, given their status early in the war as a resistance movement against Nazi occupation, a number of Jews served among the Chetnik ranks. As the Yugoslav Partisans grew in number and power, the anti-communist Chetniks became increasingly collaborationist and Jewish Chetniks switched to the partisan ranks. Subsequently, after the first half of 1942, Chetnik propaganda with chauvinist and antisemitic themes became a constant. In various places in Serbia in the period from the middle of 1942, several hundred Jews were hiding, mostly women and children. According to the testimonies of surviving Jews, the Chetniks of Draža Mihailović persecuted the Jews in that area, and took part in their killing. On many occasions, the Chetniks also handed them over to the Germans.

== Number of casualties ==
Vladimir Geiger of the Croatian Institute of History in Zagreb notes that research into human losses of Croatia and Yugoslavia during the Second World War (and in the immediate post-war years) is a controversial task and remains a sensitive political topic. Estimates regarding human losses caused by the Chetniks vary greatly.

Croatian demographer Vladimir Žerjavić initially estimated the number of Muslims and Croats killed by the Chetniks in Croatia and Bosnia and Herzegovina at 65,000 (33,000 Muslims and 32,000 Croats; both combatants and civilians). The historian Sabrina P. Ramet also cited that figure, and wrote that the Chetniks completely destroyed 300 villages and small towns and a large number of mosques and Catholic churches. In another paper from 1994, Žerjavić estimated the number of deaths at 68,000, of whom 41,000 were civilians and "casualties of direct terror". In a 1995 paper, not counting Partisan deaths, Žerjavić estimated 47,000 "victims of the Chetniks" (29,000 Muslims and 18,000 Croats).

In 1993, using primarily identification by individual names, researchers Mihajlo Sobolevski, Zdravko Dizdar, Igor Graovac and Slobodan Žarić estimated that the Chetniks were accountable for the deaths of 3,500 people in Croatia's territory, although this figure is based on incomplete research. This differed from Žerjavić's initial estimate of 20,000 for Croatia's territory. Dizdar later accepted Žerjavić's 65,000 total for Croatia and Bosnia and Herzegovina. In 2012, without providing a reference to a victim list or a verification of the data, Dizdar said that there were "over 50,000" documented, researched and registered Croat and Muslim victims of the Chetniks. The historian Enver Redžić wrote of "tens of thousands of Muslim lives" lost in Chetnik massacres. The historian Šemso Tucaković estimates in his book "Crimes Against Bosnian Muslims 1941–1945" that around 100,000 Muslims were killed by the Chetniks.

Živko Topalović, who was a close associate of Mihailović and president of the 1944 Ba Congress, claimed that the Chetniks had killed as many as 40,000 Muslims from Bosnia, Herzegovina and Sandžak by January 1944 alone.

The research of Chetnik crimes in Serbia was never systematic and was mostly conducted on a regional level by local historians and researchers. For the territory of Sandžak in Serbia and Montenegro, the researcher Safet Hadžibegović published a victim list of 3,708 Muslims of the Priboj District that were killed by the Chetniks, mostly in early February 1943. An earlier research showed that 1,058 of those victims were younger than 15. In the Pljevlja District, 1,380 victims of the Chetnik February 1943 massacre were registered in 1969. According to the Yugoslav government's "State Commission for the Determination of Crimes Committed by the Occupiers and their Supporters", the Chetniks were responsible for the deaths of 8,874 Serbian citizens outside of fighting, and the burning of 6,828 buildings. Subsequently, published victims lists indicate a higher number of fatalities.

In his book Statistics of Democide: Genocide and Mass Murder since 1900, Rudolph Rummel provides a low estimate for the "Chetnik democide" of 50,000, a high estimate of 500,000, and a mid-value of 100,000 killed Muslims, Croats, Albanians, and POWs throughout the war. The historian Tomislav Dulić, in a critical analysis of Rummel's estimates for Yugoslavia, said that they are in contrast with Yugoslav demographic research and are too high.

== Trials ==
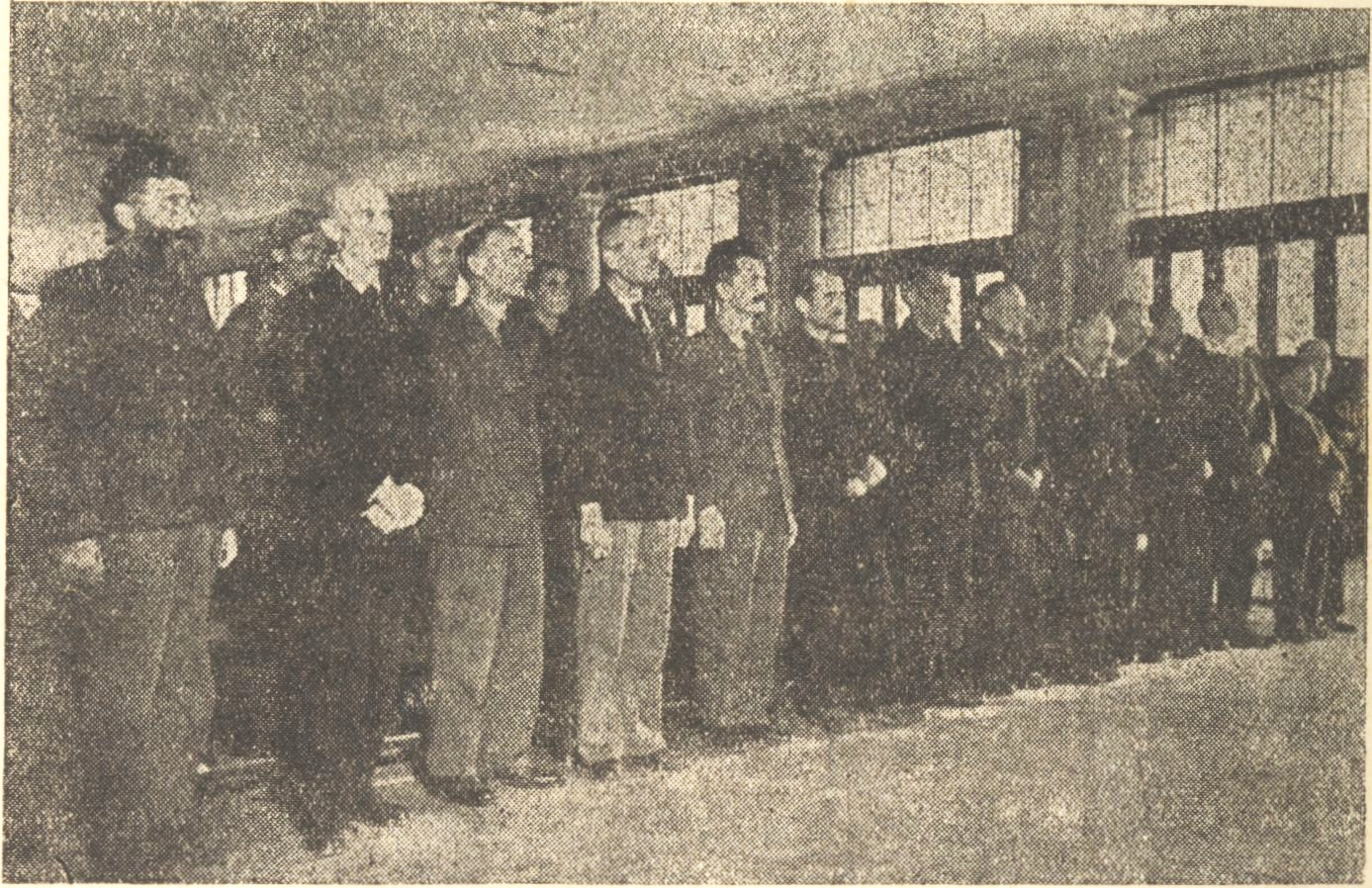
Reading of the verdict in the Trial of Mihailović et al.

Very few Chetnik leaders were put on trial after the war. The participation of Chetniks after the war in the Communist Party and the new government enabled the survival of the movement and its institutionalization.

At the beginning of August 1945, the first public post-war trial (before the court-martial) was held in Belgrade of Vojislav Lukačević and others. Public prosecutor Miloš Minić accused Lukačević of a massacre in Foča as commander of Chetnik units in Bosnia, participation in the extermination of the Muslim population, collaboration with the Nazis and Milan Nedić, and of crimes against Yugoslav Partisans. Lukačević, found guilty and sentenced to death, was executed in Belgrade in late August 1945.

Chetnik leader Dragoljub Mihailović was captured on 13 March 1946 by agents of the Yugoslav Security Agency (OZNA) and indicted on 47 counts. He was convicted of eight, including war crimes and high treason. Mihailović, sentenced to death on 15 July, was executed with nine other Chetnik commanders in Lisičji Potok in the early hours of 18 July 1946.

== Historiography ==
Bosnian professor Edina Bećirević writes that "crimes committed by Chetniks against the Muslim and Croat population have been relatively cloaked in silence" and that serious research into the genocide of Muslims during World War Two began in the 1990s. The reasoning behind the silence was two-fold, as she explains that Josip Broz Tito sought a politics of brotherhood and unity which required the consent of the historians of the region. Moreover, Bećirević cites the work of historian Max Bergholz who through his research found that many of the former Chetniks who participated in the massacres of Muslims were later absorbed into the Partisan movement and thus were not persecuted after the war ended.

Historian Samuel Totten notes that some historians argue that the Chetniks committed genocide against the Bosnian Muslims.

The historian Jozo Tomasevich wrote that the "widespread practice of genocide" was the reason for the high number of casualties of World War II in Yugoslavia: "The most numerous victims were Serbs who perished at the hands of the Ustashas and Croats and Muslims who perished at the hands of the Chetniks." He added that forces of fascist Italy were complicit in these crimes. Redžić noted that "the Chetnik campaign against the Croats and Muslims" was "conducted in the form of ethnic cleansing and genocide, to form an ethnically homogeneous territory for the expansionist Serbian state". The historians Matjaž Klemenčič and Mitja Žagar wrote that the Chetniks "carried out their ethnically based politics of “ethnic cleansing” and genocide against the civilian population in the territory under their control", and "also wanted to exterminate their political opponents who were of the same ethnicity."

According to the historian Marko Attila Hoare, "the Chetniks pursued their genocide against the Muslims and Croats under the Italian umbrella". The "Chetnik genocide" in Bosnia and Herzegovina "was the end result of the long struggle of the Bosnian Serb peasant-radicals against the Muslim landlords, as well as of the competition of Bosnian Serb nationalist politicians with the JMO for control of Bosnia-Hercegovina in the interwar period." Reviewing Hoare's book "Genocide and Resistance in Hitler's Bosnia: The Partisans and the Chetniks, 1941-1943", Jonathan Gumz and Heather Williams noted that Hoare observed the Chetniks' weak organizational structure, and that they were somewhat divided, without a strong centralized leadership capable of carrying out their own genocide.

Trying to answer the question whether the Chetniks committed genocide, the historian and genocide scholar Paul Mojzes stated that there was the intention to remove the Muslim population from some territories, but that the course of the war was complex and that they didn't have military support and orders from the Yugoslav royal government. He also added that it is clear that the Chetniks were guilty of crimes against humanity, massacres and ethnic cleansing. Michele Frucht Levy explained that the Chetniks, without a state apparatus, a territorially united leadership and a media propaganda network, carried out ethnic cleansing and massacres, rather than genocide.

David Bruce MacDonald disputed the characterization of crimes in occupied-Yugoslavia, conducted by the Chetniks or the Ustashas, as constituting genocide. Under the heading "Was there ever genocide in Serbia or Croatia?", he argues that "genocide (of Serbs or Croats) in the occupied and divided Yugoslavia during the Second World War is very difficult to prove". MacDonald also states that it would be "highly misleading" to suggest that the Chetniks collaborated with the Germans and Italians in order to carry out the genocide of Croats and Muslims. However, he later wrote that there was no concrete evidence that the Chetniks intended to exterminate the Croatian population, unlike the Ustashas, whose crimes mainly fit the definition of genocide.

The historian Tomislav Dulić compared the atrocities perpetrated by the Chetniks and the Ustashas. He noted that "the destruction processes took different forms due to the fact that the Ustashas had the infrastructural capacity of a state at their disposal, while the Chetniks were a guerrilla organization." (...) "The Chetniks tried to be as organized as they possibly could and they sought to realize a modern 'national utopia'. The problem was that they simply did not dispose of the military and infrastructural capacity to organize and maintain a coherent destruction process throughout Yugoslavia over a prolonged period of time." Paul Mojzes wrote that the equating of Chetniks and Ustaše crimes "does not stand critical scrutiny".

On the other hand, historian Mark Levene also comparing the two movements noted: "what makes Chetnik genocidal violence so compelling is that it was achieved with even less coordination than the Ustasha could muster, almost as if its commanders knew what was expected of them."

British scholar Jovan Byford holds the view that the Chetnik violence waged against Muslim civilians in eastern Bosnia in 1942 and 1943 amounted to genocide. While Byford notes that Chetnik crimes against Muslims was "more localized and smaller in scale" when compared with Ustasha violence against Serbs, "its aims, calculated cruelty, and devastating impact on the victim community were comparable."

== See also ==
- List of mass executions and massacres in Yugoslavia during World War II
- List of genocides by death toll
