= Émile Pessard =

French composer

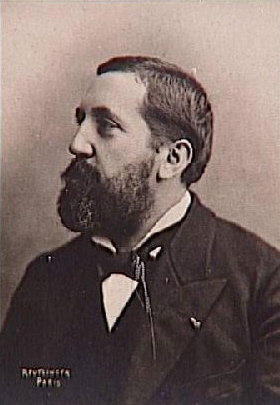
Émile Pessard; photograph by Charles Reutlinger (about 1880).

Émile Louis Fortuné Pessard (29 May 1843 – 10 February 1917) was a French composer.

Pessard was born and died in Paris. He studied at the Conservatoire de Paris, where he won 1st prize in Harmony. In 1866 he won the Grand Prix de Rome with his cantata Dalila which was performed at the Paris Opera on 21 February 1867. From 1878 to 1880 he was inspector of singing at Paris Schools, in 1881 he became professor of Harmony at the Paris Conservatory.

His students included Maurice Ravel, Jacques Ibert, William Molard, Albert Seitz and Justin Élie. After 1895 he was a critic and director. He composed many comic operas and operettas, as well as masses.

== Works ==
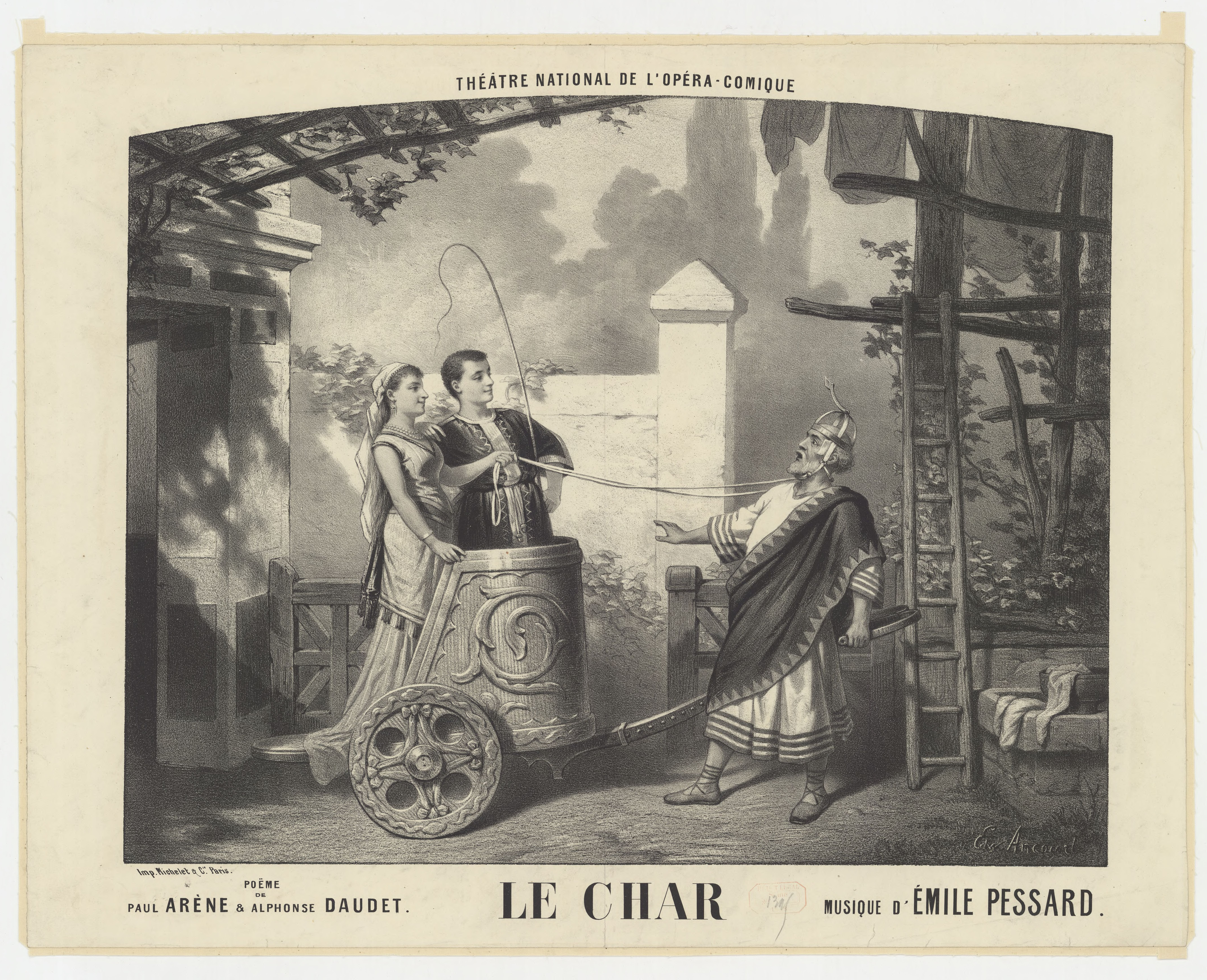
Le Char, poster by Edward Ancourt, 1878

- Dalila (cantata, 1866) Prix de Rome.
- La Cruche cassée (opéra comicque in 1 act, libretto by Hyppolite Lucas and Emile Abraham, premiered on 21 February 1870 at the Théâtre de l'Opéra-Comique in Paris)
- Don Quichotte (opera, premiered on 13 February 1874 at the Salle Érard in Paris)
- Le Char (opera, premiered on 18 January 1878 at the Théâtre de l'Opéra-Comique in Paris)
- Le Capitaine Fracasse (opera, premiered on 2 July 1878 at the Théâtre Lyrique in Paris)
- Tabarin (opera, premiered on 12 January 1885 at the Théâtre de l'Opéra in Paris)
- Tartarin sur les Alpes (comic opera, premiered on 17 November 1888 at the Théâtre de la Gaîté in Paris)
- Les Folies amoureuses (comic opera, premiered on 15 April 1891 at the Théâtre de l'Opéra-Comique in Paris); Work in three acts from Regnard, by André Lénéka and Emmanuel Matrat, with Lise Landouzy (1861-1943) (Agathe, soprano), Zoé Molé-Truffier (1855-1923) (Lisette, soprano), Ernest Carbonne (Eraste, ténor), Gabriel Soulacroix (Crispin, baryton), Lucien Fugère (Albert, basse), Edmond Clément (Clitandre, ténor) and Mr. Thierry (Ragotin, basse) ; Jules Danbé, conductor, and Henri Carré (1848-1925), choir director.
- Une Nuit de Noël (opera, premiered in 1893 at the Ambigu in Paris)
- Mam'zelle Carabin (comic opera, premiered on 3 November 1893 at the Bouffes-Parisiens, Salle Choiseul, in Paris)
- Le Muet (opera in 1 act, 1894)
- La Dame de trèfle (comic opera, premiered on 13 May 1898 at the Bouffes-Parisiens, Salle Choiseul, in Paris)
- L'Armée des vierges (comic opera in 3 acts, premiered on 15 October 1902 at the Bouffes-Parisiens, Salle Choiseul, in Paris)
- L'Epave (comic opera in 1 act, premiered on 17 February 1903 at the Bouffes-Parisiens, Salle Choiseul, in Paris)

== Recordings ==
- Émile Pessard - Vingt-cinq pièces pour le piano. Olivier Godin. XXI-21 Productions. 2011
- 2 songs on collection: L’invitation au voyage Mélodies from La belle époque : Le spectre de la rose (Théophile Gautier), Oh! quand je dors (Victor Hugo). John Mark Ainsley (tenor) Graham Johnson (pianist). Hyperion Records
- Dans la Forêt, Op. 130 on album Chant d'Automne Forgotten Treasures Vol. 6 Ulrich Hubner (horn) Kolner Akademie, Michael Alexander Willens
- One song on collection: L'adieu de matin, from Cinq Mélodies; rec. Richard Crooks (tenor) on RCA Victor, 1940; on collection Richard Crooks in Songs and Ballads (Nimbus Records)
- Petite Messe brève, op.62, for one or two voces and organ : Maîtrise d'Enfants Notre-Dame de Brive ; soloists : Virginie Verrez, Alice Imbert ; choir director : Christophe Loiseleur des Longchamps. Recorded in Gramat (Lot), with Junck organ. June 2004. Studio création n°200402.

== Sources ==
- The Biographical Dictionary of Musicians, p. 332, 1940, Blue Ribbon Books, Inc. (Original (c) 1903)
- Emile Pessard's Works (in German)
