= Nuglašica =

Nuglašica Нуглашица
- Village
- Location within Bosnia and Herzegovina
- Coordinates: 44°06′10″N 16°36′04″E
- Country: Bosnia and Herzegovina
- Entity: Federation of Bosnia and Herzegovina
- Canton: Canton 10
- Municipality: Bosansko Grahovo

Area
  - Total: 29.48 km^{2} (11.38 sq mi)

Population (2013)
  - Total: 83
  - Density: 2.8/km^{2} (7.3/sq mi)
- Time zone: UTC+1 (CET)
  - Summer (DST): UTC+2 (CEST)

Nuglašica (Serbian Cyrillic: Нуглашица) is a village in the Municipality of Bosansko Grahovo in Canton 10 of the Federation of Bosnia and Herzegovina, an entity of Bosnia and Herzegovina.

== Demographics ==
According to the 2013 census, its population was 83.

Ethnicity in 2013
| Ethnicity | Number | Percentage |
|---|---|---|
| Serbs | 81 | 97.6% |
| other/undeclared | 2 | 2.4% |
| Total | 83 | 100% |

== Bibliography ==
- Ethnicity/National Affiliation, Religion and Mother Tongue (PDF). Sarajevo: Agency for Statistics of Bosnia and Herzegovina. 2019.
