= Malo Tičevo =

Malo Tičevo Мало Тичево
- Village
- Location within Bosnia and Herzegovina
- Coordinates: 44°14′N 16°29′E
- Country: Bosnia and Herzegovina
- Entity: Federation of Bosnia and Herzegovina
- Canton: Canton 10
- Municipality: Bosansko Grahovo

Area
  - Total: 14.50 km^{2} (5.60 sq mi)

Population (2013)
  - Total: 10
  - Density: 0.69/km^{2} (1.8/sq mi)
- Time zone: UTC+1 (CET)
  - Summer (DST): UTC+2 (CEST)

Malo Tičevo (Serbian Cyrillic: Мало Тичево) is a village in the Municipality of Bosansko Grahovo in Canton 10 of the Federation of Bosnia and Herzegovina, an entity of Bosnia and Herzegovina.

== Demographics ==
According to the 2013 census, its population was 10, all Serbs.

== Bibliography ==
- Ethnicity/National Affiliation, Religion and Mother Tongue (PDF). Sarajevo: Agency for Statistics of Bosnia and Herzegovina. 2019.
