= Zebe =

Zebe Зебе
- Village
- Location within Bosnia and Herzegovina
- Coordinates: 44°15′55″N 16°20′00″E
- Country: Bosnia and Herzegovina
- Entity: Federation of Bosnia and Herzegovina
- Canton: Canton 10
- Municipality: Bosansko Grahovo

Area
  - Total: 20.15 km^{2} (7.78 sq mi)

Population (2013)
  - Total: 36
  - Density: 1.8/km^{2} (4.6/sq mi)
- Time zone: UTC+1 (CET)
  - Summer (DST): UTC+2 (CEST)

Zebe (Serbian Cyrillic: Зебе) is a village in the Municipality of Bosansko Grahovo in Canton 10 of the Federation of Bosnia and Herzegovina, an entity of Bosnia and Herzegovina.

== Demographics ==
According to the 2013 census, its population was 36, all Serbs.

== Bibliography ==
- Ethnicity/National Affiliation, Religion and Mother Tongue (PDF). Sarajevo: Agency for Statistics of Bosnia and Herzegovina. 2019. Archived from the original (PDF) on 2020-07-25.
