= Isjek =

Isjek Исјек
- Village
- Location within Bosnia and Herzegovina
- Coordinates: 44°14′26″N 16°21′25″E
- Country: Bosnia and Herzegovina
- Entity: Federation of Bosnia and Herzegovina
- Canton: Canton 10
- Municipality: Bosansko Grahovo

Area
  - Total: 21.45 km^{2} (8.28 sq mi)

Population (2013)
  - Total: 13
  - Density: 0.61/km^{2} (1.6/sq mi)
- Time zone: UTC+1 (CET)
  - Summer (DST): UTC+2 (CEST)

Isjek (Serbian Cyrillic: Исјек) is a village in the Municipality of Bosansko Grahovo in Canton 10 of the Federation of Bosnia and Herzegovina, an entity of Bosnia and Herzegovina.

== Demographics ==
According to the 2013 census, its population was 13.

Ethnicity in 2013
Ethnicity	Number	Percentage
Serbs	12	92.3%
Croats	1	7.7%
Total	13	100%

== Bibliography ==
- Ethnicity/National Affiliation, Religion and Mother Tongue (PDF). Sarajevo: Agency for Statistics of Bosnia and Herzegovina. 2019.
