= Vrtoče massacre =

Coordinates: 45.883°N 13.617°E

- Location: Vrtoče, Bosanski Petrovac
- Date: 8 August 1941
- Target: Croats
- Attack type: Mass murder
- Deaths: 70
- Perpetrators: Serb rebels, Chetniks

The Vrtoče massacre was the massacre of Croat civilians in the village of Vrtoče, committed by Serb rebels on 8 August 1941, during the Srb uprising.

== Prelude ==
Following the fall of Yugoslavia, the Kulen Vakuf region remained relatively peaceful. After the Independent State of Croatia was declared, Ustaše authorities began recruiting local Croats to join their ranks. Local Ustaše leader, Miroslav Matijević, despite facing significant difficulties in recruiting local Croats, recruited a small force that began to take part in atrocities as part of the wider genocide of Serbs. Despite local Croat and Muslim civilians intervening to stop the wider atrocities, Matijević and his local forces killed over 600 Serbs in the Kulen Vakuf region, with many of the dead and mutilated bodies being buried in the Boričevac pit. Stories of these massacres spread throughout the region from survivors to local Croats and Muslims warning their Serb neighbors of impending attacks.

On 27 July 1941, local Serbs launched an uprising against Ustaše authorities. Throughout July, August and September 1941, Croat and Muslim villages across Lika and Western Bosnia were attacked and massacred by Serb insurgents; such killings were said to have been acts of retaliation for earlier Ustaše massacres against Serbs.

== Incident ==
Chetniks and other Serb rebels, led by Mane Rovkić, entered the Croat village of Vrtoče on 8 August 1941. After quickly killing the few Ustaše guards in the village, the insurgents then massacred Croat civilians.

Among their first victims were family members of local Ustaše leader, Miroslav Matijević, his elderly parents were slaughtered, beheaded and had their heads impaled on stakes. Nine other members of the Matijević family were killed in a similar way.

The rebels and Chetniks then executed every other Croat civilian left in the village, including the village leader and local Catholic priest. Many of the victims were subjected to mutilations. A total of 70 Croat civilians were killed during the massacre, mostly women, children and the elderly.

== Aftermath ==
The rebels were able to capture a significant amount of weapons following the attack and subsequent massacre at Vrtoče. Upon hearing that his parents had been murdered, Matijević in an act of revenge killed 28 Serb men, women and children in the village of Kulen Vakuf. Similar massacres against Croats by Chetniks and other Serb insurgents continued throughout July and August 1941, culminating in massacres throughout the area of eastern Lika and western Bosnia, such as in Trubar, Bosansko Grahovo, Boričevac, Brotnja and Krnjeuša.

== Sources ==
- Goldstein, Slavko (2013). 1941: The Year That Keeps Returning. New York Review of Books. ISBN 978-1-59017-700-6. Archived from the original on 2021-03-23.
- Dizdar, Zdravko (1996). "Chetnik Genocidal Crimes Against Croatians and Muslims in Bosnia. and Herzegovina and Against Croatians in Croatia During World War II". Hic.hr. Archived from the original on 3 March 2006.
- Dizdar, Zdravko; Sobolevski, Mihajlo (1999). Prešućivani četnički zločini u Hrvatskoj i Bosni i Hercegovini: 1941-1945 [The hushed up Chetnik crimes in Croatia and Bosnia and Herzegovina: 1941-1945] (in Croatian). Zagreb: Hrvatski institut za povijest. ISBN 9789536491285.
- Tomasevich, Jozo (2002). War and Revolution in Yugoslavia: 1941 - 1945. Stanford University Press. p. 506. ISBN 978-0-8047-79241.
