= Miroslav Matijević =

Croatian Ustaše military commander (born 1908)

- Born: Miroslav Matijević; 1908; Vrtoče, Bosnia and Herzegovina, Austria-Hungary
- Died: Unknown
- Military career
- Allegiance: Ustaše (1941–1945); Independent State of Croatia (1941–1945)
- Branch: Ustaše Militia
- Nickname: Miro
- Conflicts: World War II; Srb uprising

Miroslav Matijević (born 1908, date of death unknown) was a Ustaše Militia commander during World War II. Matijević commanded a local unit, based in the Kulen Vakuf region of north-western Bosnia from 1941 to 1945.

== Early life ==
Matijević was born in 1908 in the village of Vrtoče, then part of the Condominium of Bosnia and Herzegovina of Austria-Hungary. Little is known of his life prior to the Second World War, however according to the Yugoslav State Security Service, Matijević was a member of the Croatian fascist and ultra nationalist organization, the Ustaše, prior to the war. In early 1941, he along with his wife and child moved to the village of Kulen Vakuf from Vrtoče and worked as a publican at a local tavern.

== Second World War ==
=== Invasion of Yugoslavia ===
During the Invasion of Yugoslavia, Matijević was in his home village of Vrtoče when German troops passed through the village. Matijević's father greeted the troops with a Croatian flag and gave the Nazi salute. According to locals, a local Serb police officer shot his father in the leg after he became enraged. According to Max Bergholz, bearing witness to this incident enraged Matijević to the point where he wanted to enact revenge on the Serb population.

=== Local commander ===
On approximately 15 April 1941, Matijević took up position as the local Ustaše tabor (county) commander for the Kulen Vakuf region. Within the first month of his command, the Kulen Vakuf region was relatively peaceful and minimal acts of murder or persecution were carried out on the local Serb population, in contrast to other regions. Throughout this time, Matijević embarked on a campaign to recruit members for his Ustaše Militia unit across the Kulen Vakuf region. Across local villages, he managed to recruit between 51 and 111 men, with the majority being Muslim. The lack of recruits stemmed from a significant distrust of the Ustaše regime by the local Croat population. The lack of local recruitment resulted in Matijević requesting Ustaše forces to be brought in from other regions.

=== Campaign of terror ===
In late July 1941, local Ustaše forces under Matijević's command began to enact a campaign of terror upon the Serb population as part of the wider Genocide of Serbs in the Independent State of Croatia. Local Ustaše militia robbed, killed and massacred Serb men, women and children in the Kulen Vakuf region, with many of their mutilated bodies being dumped in pits and caves outside the village of Boričevac. During this time, Jews from the city of Bihać were sent to Kulen Vakuf where they were killed by Matijević and his men. It is estimated that over 950 Serbs were killed in the Kulen Vakuf region by Matijević's men, with Matijević even taking active part in the killings. However, the number of those killed would have been higher had it not been for the intervention of local Croats and Muslims. According to Bergholz, local Croats including the wife of Matijević and parents of Ustaše Militia members, went ahead to local Serb villages in the Kulen Vakuf area, warning them of impending attacks by the Ustaše. These warnings in addition to stories from survivors from the campaign of terror, spread throughout the region.

=== Srb uprising ===
The campaign of terror committed by Matijević and his men enraged the local Serb population, leading to the Srb uprising. Local Serbs in revenge for the Ustaše campaign of terror began to attack Croat and Muslim villages in the region, massacring civilians and targeting the Ustaše Militia and their families. During this uprising, Matijević's parents were killed during a massacre in the village of Vrtoče, where their severed heads were put on display. This act of terror enraged Matijević and in response, he killed 28 Serb men, women and children in the village of Kulen Vakuf.
