= Kalati =

Kalati Калати
- Village
- Location within Bosnia and Herzegovina
- Coordinates: 44°33′52″N 16°02′54″E
- Country: Bosnia and Herzegovina
- Entity: Federation of Bosnia and Herzegovina
- Canton: Una-Sana
- Municipality: Bihać

Area
  - Total: 5.78 sq mi (14.98 km^{2})

Population (2013)
  - Total: 1
  - Density: 0.17/sq mi (0.067/km^{2})
- Time zone: UTC+1 (CET)
  - Summer (DST): UTC+2 (CEST)

Kalati (Serbian Cyrillic: Калати) is a village in the municipality of Bihać, Bosnia and Herzegovina.

== Demographics ==
According to the 2013 census, its population was one, down from 52 in 1991.

== See also ==
- Kulen Vakuf massacre
