= Kulen Vakuf massacre =

1941 killing in occupied Yugoslavia

- Location: 44°34′N 16°05′E; Kulen Vakuf in Bosnia and Herzegovina (contemporary Independent State of Croatia)
- Date: 6-8 September 1941
- Target: Muslim and Croat civilians and Ustaše POWs
- Deaths: between 1,000 and 3,000 Muslim civilians and soldiers, including 100 Croats
- Victims: Muslim and Croat civilians and captured soldiers from the Ustaše or Home Guard units
- Perpetrators: Communist-led partisan forces and non-communist Serb Chetnik rebels
- Motive: Retaliation
- Accused: Gojko Polovina

The Kulen Vakuf massacre was committed during World War II by Communist-led Yugoslav Partisans and groups of non-communist Serb rebels (including Chetniks), killing 1,000 to 3,000 Ustaše prisoners as well as Muslim, and a smaller number of Croat (around 100 killed), civilians in early September 1941 in Kulen Vakuf, part of the Independent State of Croatia (present-day Federation of Bosnia and Herzegovina). The local Ustaše had previously massacred Serbs in Kulen Vakuf and surrounding villages.

== Background ==
Ethnic Serbs were targeted by the genocidal policies of the Ustaše-led Independent State of Croatia, a puppet state of Nazi Germany which was established after the Axis invasion of Yugoslavia. The massacre of Serbs by the local Ustaše, such as those in July and early August 1941 in villages around Kulen Vakuf, led to reprisals. The retaliation was brief and quickly repressed, unlike Ustaše war crimes (which were organized at the top of the Croatian government in Zagreb, which systematically and persistently pushed the local Ustaše to commit massacres. The description of the events as conflicts between local Chetniks and Ustaše, motivated by ethnic intolerance, has been called an oversimplification.

=== Ustaše massacre of Serbs ===
The Kulen Vakuf massacre was retaliation for earlier, equally-massive Ustaše massacres of local Serbs. There are more than 280 locations where Serbs in Bosnia were tortured and killed during the summer of 1941.

Serbs were massacred in the villages of Oraško Brdo, Prkosi, Veliki Stenjani, Rajnovac, Kalati, Bušević, Kestenovac, Bosanski Srbci and Malo Seoce, all near Kulen Vakuf. During an early massacre near Kulen Vakuf, the Ustaše killed 862 Serbs in one day and 950 Serbs were killed in the village; Miroslav Matijević, a Croat who owned a local restaurant, organized and participated in the massacre of Serbs on a hill near the church in Kulen Vakuf. The Ustaše set fire to an Orthodox church in the village after they had killed many Serbs in it. Vukosav Kulenvakufski, the Serb priest of a church in the village, was murdered by the Ustaše in June 1941 after they killed his family (including his two daughters-in-law and two grandsons) in front of him.

In early August 1941, all Serb civilians from the village of Kalati were massacred or imprisoned in Kulen Vakuf, leaving the village depopulated until Kulen Vakuf and its imprisoned civilians were liberated on 6 September 1941. By 30 August 1941, the Ustaše had killed nearly 200 Serb women and children in Kalati. The Kulen Vakuf massacre also involved the liquidation of the Muslim community. Some Muslim victims were Ustaše members who had massacred Serbs; others were killed because they were thought to be ethnically linked to the Ustaše.

=== Earlier retaliatory massacres ===
The Kulen Vakuf massacre was preceded by one in Krnjeuša, when rebels killed up to 240 Croat civilians on 9 August 1941. When rebels decided to attack the Ustaše stronghold of Boričevac, they knew that the village was predominantly inhabited by Croats. Rebel commanders were relieved that Boričevac's Croat civilians escaped rebels, furious at the massacre of the Serbian population of Lika, by fleeing to Kulen Vakuf; A rebel leader warned them by letter about the expected attack. After they captured Boričevac, the rebels discovered two mass graves of Serbian civilians nearby; some rebels recognized family members among the dead. Although they were ordered not to raze the village, the rebels set fire to its houses. Serb rebels later massacred 179 Croat civilians, primarily the aged, infirm, women and children in Boričevac.

== Capture ==
The rebel forces were under the command of headquarters in Drvar. Communist forces consisted of the Freedom (Serbo-Croatian: Sloboda, Слобода) Battalion, commanded by Stevan Pilipović-Maćuka and Đoko Jovanić; one detachment of communist forces from Lika was commanded by Stojan Matić, and Gojko Polovina was their political leader. Other communist detachments were commanded by Nikola Karanović and Pero Đilas, who later joined the Chetniks against the partisans. The communist forces were headquartered in Doljanski Bubanj, a hamlet of Doljani. The rebel forces included non-communists who were known as Chetniks. Their commanders included Mane Rokvić, who later joined the Chetniks and became a well-known military officer.

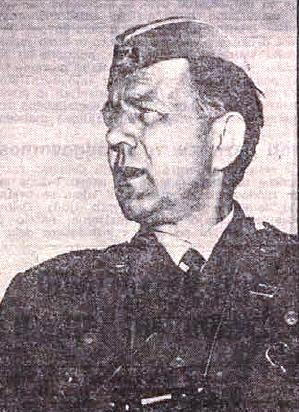
Đoko Jovanić

The Croatian garrison in Kulen Vakuf, commanded by Vladimir Veber, consisted of one battalion of Ustaše and Home Guard forces and Muslim members of local militias from the villages of Ćukovo, Orašac and Klis. Veber, notorious in the region for his massacres of Serbs between June and September 1941, was trapped in Kulen Vakuf after he tried to reach Srb from Bihać to fight the rebels in the Srb and Drvar uprisings, was ambushed in Boričevac and lost 20 of his men. Since the Ustaše had substantial forces in Bosanski Petrovac, the rebels cut it off from Kulen Vakuf and attacked the villages of Ćukovi and Orašac. The Ustaše eventually retreated to Kulen Vakuf.

The decision to attack Kulen Vakuf was made by communist leaders including Marko Orešković, Gojko Polovina and Stevan Pilipović, who estimated that the rebel forces encircling the village were strong enough to capture it. According to the communist plan to capture the village, the Freedom Battalion would attack from the villages of Vrtoče and Prkosi and the detachment from Lika would cross the Una River.

When Veber realized that Kulen Vakuf was surrounded by superior rebel forces, he decided to break through the rebel lines along the road to Prkos and Bihać with refugees from Croat villages shielding his forces. Veber intended to retreat, regardless of civilian casualties.

The Ustaše attacked the Freedom Battalion late on the night of 5 September 1941. When Veber ordered the evacuation of civilians from the town, the Croatian civilians left in an organized manner. The Muslims were reluctant to leave, expecting the surrender of its garrison although Muslim traders insisted on evacuation. During the night, the Ustaše tried to break through rebel lines and met strong resistance when they reached the village of Prkosi.

The captured civilians were brought back to Kulen Vakuf, with the intention of transporting them to Bihać against the orders of Stojan Matić. Matić was informed about the Ustaše attack on Drenovača (toward Lapac), handed over the imprisoned civilians to town guards, and headed toward Lapac with his forces.

== Massacre ==
When rebels entering Kulen Vakuf later organized the exhumation of mass graves in the village, they discovered that the Ustaše had killed 1,000 Serbs several days earlier (in addition to the 1,000 killed earlier that year in surrounding villages). This enraged the rebels, who blamed the local Croat and Muslim populations, and killed 1,000 to 3,000 (including women and children), Some communist officers did what they could to protect imprisoned civilians, but only managed to save a small number. according to contemporary Croatian sources.

The communist forces issued a report on 9 September 1941 emphasizing that the order received on 7 September had been carried out and Kulen Vakuf liberated; the communist detachment from Lika transported prisoners to Martin Brod.

== Aftermath and legacy ==
Kulen Vakuf was set ablaze by refugees and drunken rebels. Although Veber avoided capture by escaping from the rebel encirclement, he and his forces were killed by the communist Čapajev Battalion on 3 October 1941.

When they learned about what happened during and after the capture of Kulen Vakuf, the Communist leadership requested a detailed report about the massacre (including a list of participating detachments).

To avoid implications that the partisans were war criminals, communist authorities were silent about the Kulen Vakuf massacre because some of its commanders survived the war and advanced in the communist hierarchy; General Đoko Jovanić received the Order of the People's Hero. Vukosav of Kulen Vakuf was canonized by the Serbian Orthodox Church on 28 May 2003.

== Sources ==
- Redžić, Enver (2005). Bosnia and Herzegovina in the Second World War. Psychology Press. ISBN 978-0-7146-5625-0.
- Levene, Mark (December 2013). Annihilation: Volume II: The European Rimlands 1939-1953. OUP Oxford. ISBN 978-0-19-968304-8.
- Bergholz, Max (2018). NASILJE KAO GENERATIVNA SILA IDENTITET, NACIONALIZAM I SJEĆANJE U JEDNOJ BALKANSKOJ ZAJEDNICI (PDF) (in Serbo-Croatian). Sarajevo and Zagreb: Buybook.
- Damjanović, Danilo (1972). Ustanak naroda Hrvatske 1941 u Srbu i okolini. Progres.
- Bulajić, Milan (1988). Ustaški zločini genocida i suđenje Andriji Artukoviću 1986. godine. Izdavačka radna organizacija "Rad". ISBN 9788609002243.
- Majstorović, Milan; Medić, Mićo (1961). Prve iskre: Doljani u NOB. Lykos.
- Hamović, Miloš (1994). Izbjeglištvo u Bosni i Hercegovini: 1941-1945. Filip Višnjić. ISBN 9788673631394.
- Morača, Pero (1972). Drvar 1941-1945: Sjećanja učesnika. Skupshtine.
- Bokan, Branko (1972). Podgrmeč u NOB.: Podgrmeč do ustanka i u ustanku 1941. Vojnoizdavački zavod.
- Antonić, Zdravko (2001). Dokumenta o genocidu nad Srbima u Bosni i Herzegovini od aprila do avgusta 1941. Akademija nauka i umjetnosti Republike Srpske.
- Dakina, Gojo Riste (1994). Genocide Over the Serbs in the Independent State of Croatia: Be Catholic Or Die. Institute of Contemporary History. ISBN 9788674030585.
- Đurić, Veljko Đ (1989). Ustaše i pravoslavlje: hrvatska pravoslavna crkva. Beletra. ISBN 9788674690123.
- Burg, Steven L.; Shoup, Paul S. (13 January 1999). The War in Bosnia-Herzegovina: Ethnic Conflict and International Intervention. M.E. Sharpe. p. 38. ISBN 978-0-7656-3189-3.
