= Ćukovi =

Ćukovi Ћукови
- Village
- Location within Bosnia and Herzegovina
- Coordinates: 44°39′42″N 16°03′50″E
- Country: Bosnia and Herzegovina
- Entity: Federation of Bosnia and Herzegovina
- Canton: Una-Sana
- Municipality: Bihać

Area
  - Total: 6.22 sq mi (16.12 km^{2})

Population (2013)
  - Total: 221
  - Density: 35.5/sq mi (13.7/km^{2})
- Time zone: UTC+1 (CET)
  - Summer (DST): UTC+2 (CEST)

Ćukovi (Serbian Cyrillic: Ћукови) is a village in the municipality of Bihać, Bosnia and Herzegovina.

== Demographics ==
According to the 2013 census, its population was 221.

Ethnicity in 2013
Ethnicity	Number	Percentage
Bosniaks	209	94.6%
Serbs	1	0.5%
other/undeclared	11	5.0%
Total	221	100%

== See also ==
- Kulen Vakuf massacre
