= Ugarci, Bosansko Grahovo =

Ugarci Угарци
- Village
- Location within Bosnia and Herzegovina
- Coordinates: 44°09′54″N 16°22′13″E
- Country: Bosnia and Herzegovina
- Entity: Federation of Bosnia and Herzegovina
- Canton: Canton 10
- Municipality: Bosansko Grahovo

Area
  - Total: 16.75 km^{2} (6.47 sq mi)

Population (2013)
  - Total: 183
  - Density: 10.9/km^{2} (28.3/sq mi)
- Time zone: UTC+1 (CET)
  - Summer (DST): UTC+2 (CEST)

Ugarci (Serbian Cyrillic: Угарци) is a village in the Municipality of Bosansko Grahovo in Canton 10 of the Federation of Bosnia and Herzegovina, an entity of Bosnia and Herzegovina.

== Demographics ==
According to the 2013 census, its population was 183.

Ethnicity in 2013
Ethnicity	Number	Percentage
Serbs	123	67.2%
Croats	60	32.8%
Total	183	100%

== Bibliography ==
- Ethnicity/National Affiliation, Religion and Mother Tongue (PDF). Sarajevo: Agency for Statistics of Bosnia and Herzegovina. 2019.
