= Luka, Bosansko Grahovo =

Luka
- Village
- Location within Bosnia and Herzegovina
- Coordinates: 44.1597°N 16.4081°E
- Country: Bosnia and Herzegovina
- Entity: Federation of Bosnia and Herzegovina
- Canton: Canton 10
- Municipality: Bosansko Grahovo

Area
  - Total: 54.12 km^{2} (20.90 sq mi)

Population (2013)
  - Total: 60
  - Density: 1.1/km^{2} (2.9/sq mi)
- Time zone: UTC+1 (CET)
  - Summer (DST): UTC+2 (CEST)

Luka is a village in the Municipality of Bosansko Grahovo in Canton 10 of the Federation of Bosnia and Herzegovina, an entity of Bosnia and Herzegovina.

== Demographics ==
According to the 2013 census, its population was 60.

Ethnicity in 2013
Ethnicity	Number	Percentage
Croats	36	60.0%
Serbs	20	33.3%
other/undeclared	4	6.7%
Total	60	100%

== Bibliography ==
- Ethnicity/National Affiliation, Religion and Mother Tongue (PDF). Sarajevo: Agency for Statistics of Bosnia and Herzegovina. 2019.
