= Brotnja massacre =

1941 massacre in present-day Croatia

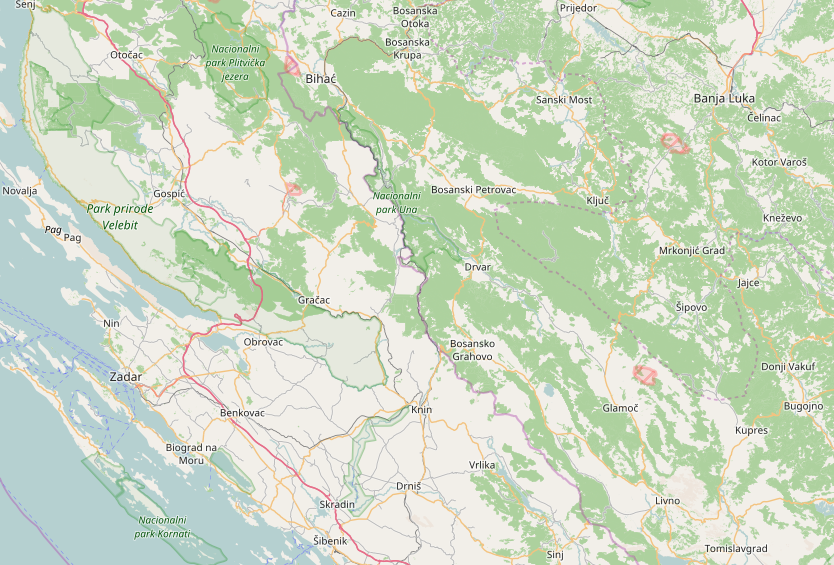
- Locations of massacres in summer 1941
- Location: Brotnja
- Date: 27 July 1941
- Target: Croat civilians
- Attack type: war crime, mass killing
- Deaths: 37
- Perpetrators: Serb rebels, Chetniks

The Brotnja massacre was the massacre of Croat civilians in the village of Brotnja, committed by Serb rebels on 27 July 1941, during the Srb and Drvar uprisings.

== Prelude ==
In the weeks prior to the Srb Uprising, local Serb civilians had been the victims of Ustaše atrocities.

Throughout July 1941, Ustaše general, Vjekoslav Luburić, ordered the "cleansing" of Serbs from the Donji Lapac area in Lika and the bordering regions of Bosanska Krajina.

A number of local Croat peasants from the area joined the Ustaše movement and actively took part in massacres against local Serb civilians, including the massacre of almost 300 Serbs in the nearby village of Suvaja, at the start of July 1941. It is known that at least two people from Brotnja joined the Ustaše and took part in crimes against Serbs. However, the majority of Croats did not take part in such crimes, many moderate Croats were opposed to them and actively tried to help their Serb neighbours.

On 27 July 1941, local Serbs launched an uprising against Ustaše authorities. Throughout July, August and September 1941, Croat and Muslim villages across Lika and Western Bosnia were attacked and massacred by Serb insurgents, such killings were said to have been acts of retaliation for earlier Ustaše massacres against Serbs.

== Incident ==
On 27 July 1941 Chetniks, and other Serb rebels under Chetnik leadership, entered Brotnja, gathering and killing the remaining 37 Croat civilians left in the village, their bodies were thrown into a deep, vertical cave, some were thrown into the pit alive. The village was then subsequently destroyed.

24 of the victims were members of the Ivezić family, while 12 of the victims were children, the youngest being just three years old.

== Aftermath ==
Massacres against Croats by Chetniks and other Serb insurgents continued throughout July and August 1941, culminating in further massacres throughout the area of eastern Lika and western Bosnia, such as in Trubar, Bosansko Grahovo, Boričevac, Vrtoče and Krnjeuša.

In 2014, a mass grave containing 19 victims of the massacre were exhumed and reburied elsewhere.

== Books ==
- Dizdar, Zdravko; Sobolevski, Mihajlo (1999). Prešućivani četnički zločini u Hrvatskoj i u Bosni i Hercegovini 1941–1945 [Suppressed Chetnik Crimes in Croatia and Bosnia and Herzegovina 1941–1945]. Zagreb: Croatian Institute of History. ISBN 978-953-6491-28-5.
- Tomasevich, Jozo (2001). War and Revolution in Yugoslavia, 1941–1945: Occupation and Collaboration. Vol. 2. San Francisco: Stanford University Press. ISBN 978-0-8047-3615-2.

=== Websites ===
- Zdravko Dizdar (1996). "Chetnik Genocidal Crimes Against Croatians and Muslims in Bosnia. and Herzegovina and Against Croatians in Croatia During World War II". Hic.hr. Archived from the original on 3 March 2006.
