= Brotnja =

Brotnja Бротња (Serbian)
- Village
- Location within Croatia
- Coordinates: 44°26′41″N 16°07′24″E
- Country: Croatia
- County: Zadar County
- Municipality: Gračac

Area
  - Total: 12.0 km^{2} (4.6 sq mi)
- Elevation: 486 m (1,594 ft)

Population (2021)
  - Total: 22
  - Density: 1.8/km^{2} (4.7/sq mi)
- Time zone: UTC+1 (CET)
  - Summer (DST): UTC+2 (CEST)
- Postal code: 23445 Srb
- Area code: +385 (23)

Brotnja (Serbian Cyrillic: Бротња) is a village in Croatia. It is connected by the D218 highway.

== History ==
During the Second World War, on 27 July 1941, Serb Communist insurgents and Chetniks attacked the village and committed a massacre of Croat civilians known as the Brotnja massacre.

On 27 March 2022 at 14:54 the ŽVOC Zadar received a call about a wildfire in the area. 6 hectares (15 acres) burned by the time it was put out at 17:00 by IVP Zadar.

== Population ==
According to the 2011 census, Brotnja had 47 inhabitants.

Population
1857	1869	1880	1890	1900	1910	1921	1931	1948	1953	1961	1971	1981	1991	2001	2011
350	447	271	392	519	531	541	627	366	375	287	229	170	125	34	47

=== 1991 census ===
According to the 1991 census, settlement of Brotnja had 125 inhabitants, which were ethnically declared as following:

Brotnja
1991
total: 125
1. Serbs 123 (98.4%)
2. Montenegrins 1 (0.80%)
3. Yugoslavs 1 (0.80%)

=== Austro-hungarian 1910 census ===
According to the 1910 census, settlement of Brotnja had 531 inhabitants in 4 hamlets, which were linguistically and religiously declared as this:

Population by language	Croatian or Serbian
Brotnja	331
Suvajska Joševica	92
Suvajski Ponorac	85
Zaglavci	23
Total	531 (100%)

Population by religion	Eastern Orthodox	Roman Catholics
Brotnja	277	54
Suvajska Joševica	92	-
Suvajski Ponorac	85	-
Zaglavci	23	-
Total	477 (89.83%)	54 (10.16%)

== Literature ==
- Savezni zavod za statistiku i evidenciju FNRJ i SFRJ, popis stanovništva 1948, 1953, 1961, 1971, 1981. i 1991. godine.
- Knjiga: "Narodnosni i vjerski sastav stanovništva Hrvatske, 1880-1991: po naseljima, autor: Jakov Gelo, izdavač: Državni zavod za statistiku Republike Hrvatske, 1998., ISBN 953-6667-07-X, ISBN 978-953-6667-07-9;
