= Cikot =

Cikot Цикот
- Village
- Location within Serbia
- Coordinates: 43°53′57″N 21°05′23″E
- Country: Serbia
- Time zone: UTC+1 (CET)
  - Summer (DST): UTC+2 (CEST)

Cikot (Serbian Cyrillic: Цикот) is a village in Šumadija and Western Serbia (Šumadija), in the municipality of Rekovac (Region of Levač), lying at 43°53′57″N 21°05′23″E, at the elevation of 270 m. According to the 2002 census, the village had 277 citizens.
