= Šemso Tucaković =

Bosnian writer, historian

- Born: Sarajevo, Yugoslavia
- Occupation: Professor
- Notable work: Srpski zločini nad Bošnjacima-muslimanima: 1941-1945

Šemso Tucaković is a Bosnian writer, historian and faculty member in the Department of Political Sciences at the University of Sarajevo.

His work focuses on the Bosnian Muslim (Bosniak) experience during World War II in occupied Yugoslavia.

During the 1990s, he covered the Bosnian War as a journalist.

== Work ==
His best-known works include:

- Srpski zločini nad Bošnjacima-muslimanima: 1941-1945 (Sarajevo, 1995)
- Aladža džamija - ubijeni Monument (Sarajevo, 1998)
- Propagandno komuniciranje (Sarajevo, 1999)
- Historija komuniciranja (Sarajevo, 2000)
- Leksikon mass-medija: informisanje, javnost, komuniciranje, novinarstvo, mediji, propaganda, povijest (Sarajevo, 2004)
- Partizanski mediji i propaganda u Bosni i Hercegovini (Sarajevo, 2003)
- Historija novinarstva i medija u Bosni i Hercegovini (Sarajevo, 2006)
- Ratna komunikologija (Sarajevo, 2013)
- Prešućeni genocid: (zločini srpskih snaga na Drini 1941.-1945.) (Sarajevo, 2013)
- Izvještaji iz bosanskog rata : (dnevničke zabilješke) (Fojnica, 2017)
