= Sepci =

- Village
- Location within Serbia
- Coordinates: 44°15′55″N 20°50′03″E
- Country: Serbia
- District: Šumadija District
- Municipality: Rača

Population (2002)
  - Total: 673
- Time zone: UTC+1 (CET)
  - Summer (DST): UTC+2 (CEST)

Sepci (Serbian: Сепци) is a village in the municipality of Rača, Serbia. According to the 2002 census, the village has a population of 673 people.
