= Albert Seitz =

French composer and viola player (1872–1937)

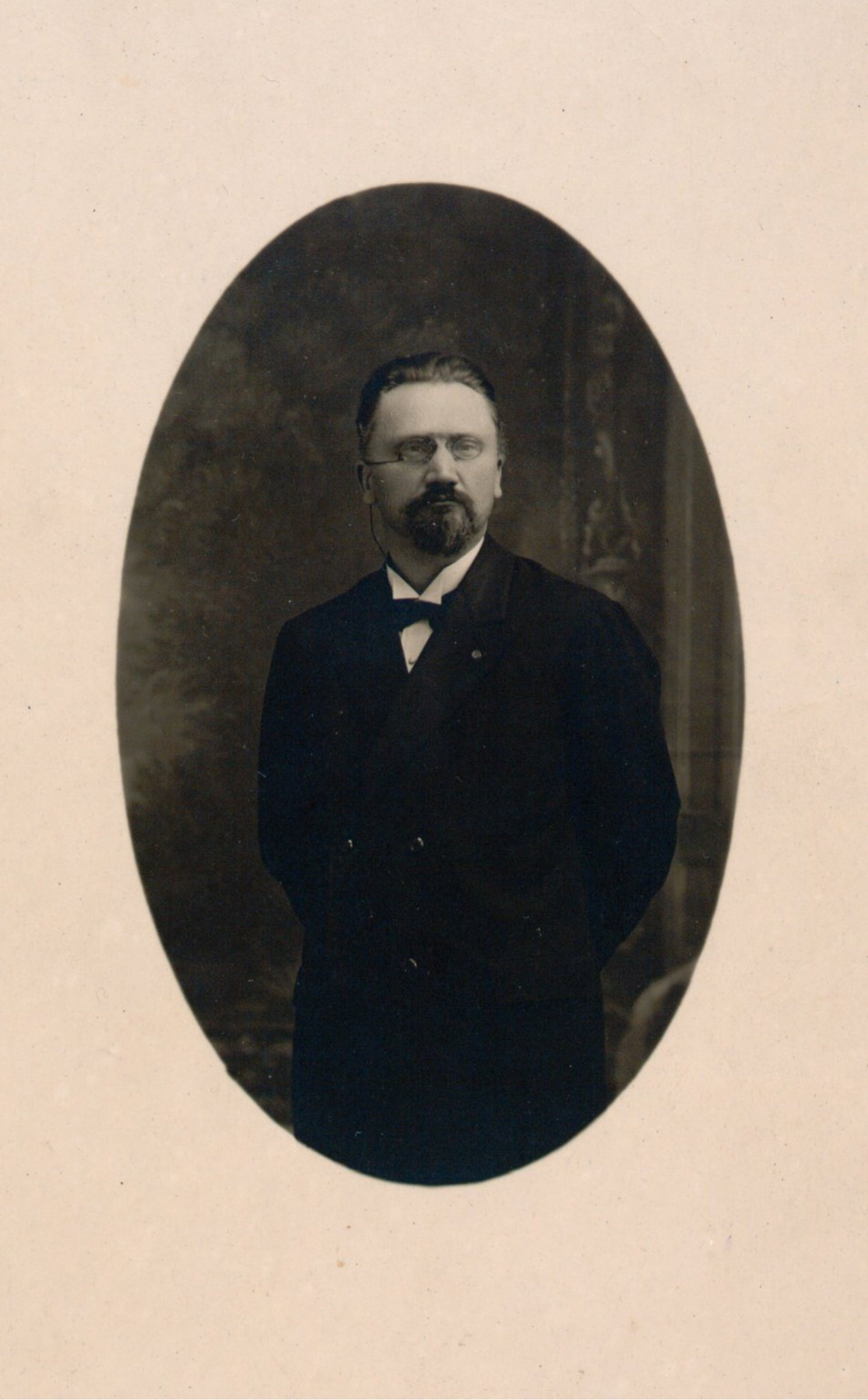
Albert Seitz

Albert Seitz (24 June 1872 – 23 September 1937) was a French composer and viola player.

Born in Besançon, Seitz was a violist with the Orchestre de la Société des Concerts du Conservatoire from 1900 to 1932.

== Selected works ==
- Un nuage à la lune de miel, Opérette in 1 act (1896); libretto by Charles Frot
- Lamento for harmonium and piano (1898)
- Chant dans la nuit, 2 Pièces for flute (or violin) or cello and piano, Op. 14 (published 1901 by Demets of Paris)

1. Aux jours heureux
2. Évocation

- Sextet No. 1 for flute, oboe, clarinet, bassoon, horn and piano, Op. 22 No. 1
- Sextet No. 2 for flute, oboe, clarinet, bassoon, horn and piano, Op. 22 No. 2
- String Quartet in C major, Op. 24
- Sonata in C minor for violin and piano, Op. 30 (1904)
- Fantaisie de concert in D minor for viola or cello and piano, Op. 31 (1904)
- 2 Pièces for violin and piano, Op. 33

1. Tendresse
2. Danse szekler

- Offertoire, Trio for violin, harmonium and piano, Op. 37 (1899)
- Cloches pascales, Trio for violin, harmonium and piano, Op. 44 (1899)
- Andante cantabile for clarinet and organ
