= Vrtoče, Bosanski Petrovac =

Vrtoče Врточе
- Village
- Location within Bosnia and Herzegovina
- Coordinates: 44°38′05″N 16°10′31″E
- Country: Bosnia and Herzegovina
- Entity: Federation of Bosnia and Herzegovina
- Canton: Una-Sana
- Municipality: Bosanski Petrovac

Area
  - Total: 11.15 sq mi (28.87 km^{2})

Population (2013)
  - Total: 176
  - Density: 15.8/sq mi (6.10/km^{2})
- Time zone: UTC+1 (CET)
  - Summer (DST): UTC+2 (CEST)

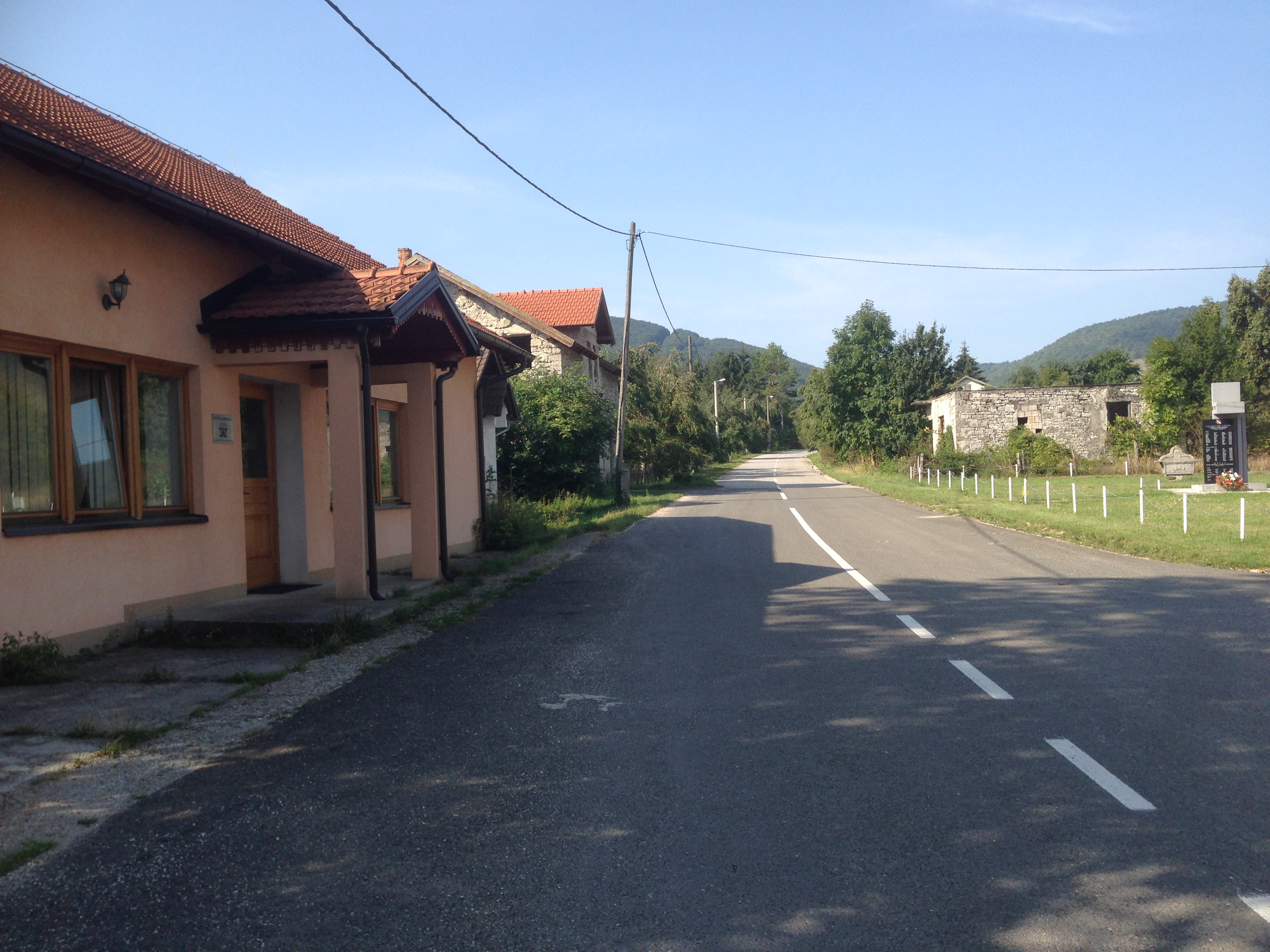
Vrtoče village

Vrtoče (Serbian Cyrillic: Врточе) is a village in the municipality of Bosanski Petrovac, Bosnia and Herzegovina.

== Demographics ==
According to the 2013 census, its population was 176.

Ethnicity in 2013
Ethnicity	Number	Percentage
Serbs	168	95.5%
Bosniaks	1	0.6%
Croats	1	0.6%
other/undeclared	6	3.4%
Total	176	100%
