= Municipality of Bosansko Grahovo =

Municipality of Bosansko Grahovo Općina Bosansko Grahovo (Croatian) Општина Босанско Грахово (Serbian)
- Municipality
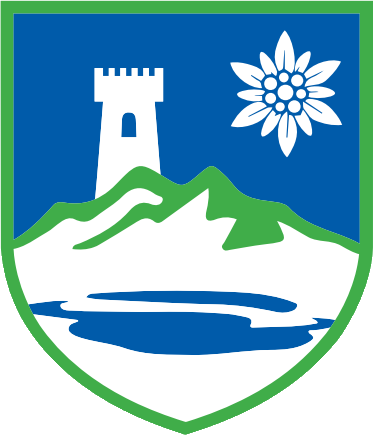
- Coat of arms

- Location of the Municipality of Bosansko Grahovo within Bosnia and Herzegovina
- Country: Bosnia and Herzegovina
- Entity: Federation of Bosnia and Herzegovina
- Canton: Canton 10
- Seat: Bosansko Grahovo

Government
  - Municipal president: Smiljka Radlović (Ind.)

Area
  - Total: 780 km^{2} (300 sq mi)

Population (2013)
  - Total: 2,449
  - Density: 3.1/km^{2} (8.1/sq mi)
- Demonym: Grahovan
- Website: www.bosanskograhovo.ba

Municipality of Bosansko Grahovo (Serbian Cyrillic: Општина Босанско Грахово; Croatian: Općina Bosansko Grahovo) is a municipality in Canton 10 of the Federation of Bosnia and Herzegovina, an entity of Bosnia and Herzegovina. Its seat is in Bosansko Grahovo. According to the 2013 census, it had a population of 2,449.

== History ==
=== Austria-Hungary ===
During the Austro-Hungarian rule in Bosnia and Herzegovina, the present-day territory of Bosnia and Herzegovina was divided into counties (Serbo-Croatian: okrug) and kotars (districts). The territory of the Municipality of Bosansko Grahovo belonged to the Travnik Okrug and to the Kotar of Livno.

=== Kingdom of Yugoslavia ===
The Kingdom of Yugoslavia retained the local organisation inherited from Austria-Hungary, with the country being divided into oblasts instead of okrugs since 1922. The territory of the Municipality of Bosansko Grahovo belonged to the Travnik Oblast and the Srez of Livno.

From 1929, the country was divided into banovinas (banates). The territory of the Municipality of Bosansko Grahovo became a srez on its own and belonged to the Vrbas Banovina.

=== World War II ===
During World War II, from 1941 to 1945, the municipality was a part of the Axis puppet state the Independent State of Croatia (NDH). Administratively, it belonged to the Grand Parish of Krbava and Psat, established on 16 June 1941. The seat of the Parish was in Bihać. The Kotar of Bosansko Grahovo included the town of Bosansko Grahovo, Crni Lug, Drvar and Trubar. On 1 January 1942, the Kotar of Bosansko Grahovo was transferred to the Grand Parish of Bribir and Sidraga.

== Demographics ==
Nationalities
1. Serbs (82.8%)
2. Croats (16.1%)
3. Others (1.14%)

According to the 2013 census, the population of the municipality was 2,449.

Nationality	Population 2013	%
Serbs	2,028	82.81
Croats	393	16.05
Others	28	0.14
Total	2,449	

== Bibliography ==
- Ethnicity/National Affiliation, Religion and Mother Tongue (PDF). Sarajevo: Agency for Statistics of Bosnia and Herzegovina. 2019.
- Plećaš, Neđeljko; Dimitrijević, Bojan (2004). Ratne godine. Institut za savremenu istoriju. ISBN 9788674030912.
- Zovko, Ljubomir (2007). Studije iz pravne povijesti Bosne i Hercegovine 1878.-1941 [The studies of legal history of Bosnia and Herzegovina 1878-1941] (in Croatian). Mostar: Faculty of Law, University of Mostar. ISBN 9789958927126.
