= Kosovo: A Short History =

1998 book

- First edition
- Author: Noel Malcolm
- Genre: Non-fiction
- Publisher: New York University Press
- Publication date: 1998

Kosovo: A Short History is a 1998 book by British historian Noel Malcolm.

== Description ==
Malcolm's research focuses on the articulation and deconstruction of nationalist historical discourse in the context of the Serbian-Albanian conflict in Kosovo. According to the author, three major myths of Serbian nationalist historiography, which were prevalent at the time of writing, were used as the main examples via which nationalist discourse presents itself: the myth of Kosovo as the "cradle of Serbdom", the myth of the Battle of Kosovo in 1389 and the myth of how Kosovo became Albanian majority.

== Reviews ==
Reviews of Kosovo: A Short History have varied in scope and coverage. In English Historical Review, Zbyněk Zeman observed that Malcolm "tries not to take sides", but in American Historical Review, Nicholas J. Miller stated that the book was "conceptually flawed" by Malcolm's insistence on treating Kosovo as "a place on its own; [rather than as] a scrap of irredenta that Serbs and Albanians fight over". Writing the same period, Laina K. Reynolds praised the "overall effort as an important contribution to understanding the area" and "an excellent orientation to the history of the region", while criticising the lack of consultation of the archives of the Serbian Orthodox Church.

Later the same year, historian Thomas Emmert reviewed the book in the Journal of Southern Europe and the Balkans Online and, while praising aspects of the book, also asserted that it was "shaped by the author's overriding determination to challenge Serbian myths". He said that Malcolm was "partisan" and complained that the book made a "transparent attempt to prove that the main Serbian myths are false". Emmert also criticised Malcolm's opposition to the Serbian claim to Kosovo as the "cradle of civilisation", stating that Kosovo did become the centre of medieval Serbia and that such feelings among modern Serbs should not be disputed. Emmert also noted the absence of Serbian archives and Malcolm's unbalanced views regarding Albanian hostile acts towards the Serbs. Likewise, Tim Judah and Misha Glenny criticised Malcolm for not using Serbian sources in the book. Malcolm responded in the same journal in early 2000, asserting that the book challenged both Albanian and Serbian myths about Kosovo, but that there were more Serbian myths about Kosovo than Albanian ones and this explained the greater coverage of Serbian myths in the book. He also observed that Emmert's perspective and work were largely within the framework of Serbian historiography, and that that was the reason for Emmert's assertion that Malcolm was "partisan". Malcolm said that there were no proper Serbian archives for that period of history, but also noted that he had studied a large number of works by Serbian and Montenegrin authors.

A 2006 study by historian Frederick Anscombe looked at issues surrounding scholarship on Kosovo such as Noel Malcolm's book. Anscombe noted that Malcolm offered "a detailed critique of the competing versions of Kosovo's history" and that his work marked a "remarkable reversal" of previous acceptance by him, like other western historians, of the "Serbian account" regarding the migration of the Serbs (1690) from Kosovo.

=== In Serbian academia ===
Since its publication, the book has been the subject of extensive, mostly negative, reviews among Serbian historians. The book was the subject of an extended debate in Foreign Affairs. The debate began with a review of the book by Aleksa Djilas, a former Fellow of the Russian Research Center at Harvard University, who wrote that the book was "marred by his sympathies for its ethnic Albanian separatists, anti-Serbian bias, and illusions about the Balkans". Malcolm responded that Djilas had not produced any evidence to counter the evidence in the book, and had instead resorted to belittling both Malcolm and his work, including the use of personal slurs and patronising language. The debate continued with Serbian-born professor Stevan K. Pavlowitch of the University of Southampton asserting that Malcolm's book lacked precision, Melanie McDonagh of the Bosnian Institute arguing that Djilas's review took a "nationalistic approach", and Norman Cigar of Marine Corps University stating that Djilas was trying to create myths to legitimise Serbian actions in Kosovo.

In 1999, the Serbian Academy of Sciences and Arts published a book as a response to Kosovo: A Short History with Milorad Ekmečić as one of the head authors.

In a 2007 work, Serbian historian and politician Dušan T. Bataković stated that Malcolm's book about Kosovo was "notoriously pro-Albanian". Bataković has been criticised as one of the key Serbian historians who in the 1980s and 1990s advanced a Serbian nationalist perspective regarding Kosovo.

== Sources ==
=== Books ===
- Bataković, Dušan T. (2007). Kosovo and Metohija : Living in the Enclave. Balkanološki institut SANU. ISBN 978-8-67179-052-9.
- Elsie, Robert (2010), Historical dictionary of Albania, Lanham: Scarecrow Press, ISBN 978-0-8108-7380-3
- Ekmečić, Milorad; Janković, Đorđe; Miljković-Bojanić, Ema; Bjelajac, Mile; Borozan, Đorđe; Dimić, Ljubodrag (1999). Terzić, Slavenko (ed.). Response to Noel Malcolm's book 'Kosovo: A Short History'. Collection of Works; vol. 18. Institute of History of the Serbian Academy of Sciences and Arts. ISBN 978-86-7743-020-7.

=== Journals ===
- Anscombe, Frederick (2006). "The Ottoman Empire in Recent International Politics - II: The Case of Kosovo" (PDF). The International History Review. 28 (4): 758–793. doi:10.1080/07075332.2006.9641103. JSTOR 40109813. S2CID 154724667.
- Djilas, Aleksa (1998). "Imagining Kosovo: A Biased New Account Fans Western Confusion". Foreign Affairs. 77 (5 September/October 1998): 124–131. doi:10.2307/20049055. JSTOR 20049055.
- Emmert, Thomas (1999). "Challenging myth in a short history of Kosovo". Journal of Southern Europe and the Balkans Online. 1 (2): 217–221. doi:10.1080/14613199908414002.
- Malcolm, Noel (1999c). "What Ancient Hatreds?". Foreign Affairs. 78 (1 January/February 1999): 130–134. doi:10.2307/20020248. JSTOR 20020248.
- Malcolm, Noel (2000). "Response to Thomas Emmert". Journal of Southern Europe and the Balkans. 2 (1): 121–124. doi:10.1080/14613190050004871. S2CID 155920999.
- Miller, Nicholas J. (1998). "Noel Malcolm, Kosovo: A Short History, New York:New York University Press. 1998". American Historical Review. 103 (5 December 1998): 1648–1649. doi:10.1086/ahr/103.5.1648.
- Zeman, Zbyněk (1999). "Kosovo. A Short History by Noel Malcolm". The English Historical Review. 114 (457 June 1999): 801–802. doi:10.1093/ehr/114.457.801. JSTOR 580536.
- Reynolds, Laina (2000). "A Very current history: Three stories of Kosovo". Civil Wars. 3. doi:10.1080/13698240008402449.

=== Newspapers and magazines ===
- Judah, Tim (14 May 1998), "Will There Be a War in Kosovo?", New York Review of Books, vol. 45, no. 8
- Malcolm, Noel (12 November 1995), "David Owen and His Balkan Bungling", The Sunday Telegraph
- Malcolm, Noel (16 July 1998c), "Kosovo's History", New York Review of Books, vol. 45, no. 12
