= Noel Malcolm =

British historian and journalist (born 1956)

Sir Noel Malcolm FRSL FBA
- Born: Noel Robert Malcolm; 26 December 1956 (age 69); Surrey, England
- Occupations: Historian and journalist
- Awards: British Academy Medal

Academic background
- Education: Eton College; Peterhouse, Cambridge; Trinity College, Cambridge

Academic work
- Discipline: History
- Sub-discipline: Early modern Europe; Early modern philosophy; History of the Balkans; Thomas Hobbes; History of sexuality; Political history
- Institutions: Gonville and Caius College, Cambridge; All Souls College, Oxford

Sir Noel Robert Malcolm, FRSL, FBA (born 26 December 1956) is an English political journalist, historian and academic who is a senior research fellow at All Souls College, Oxford. A King's Scholar at Eton College, Malcolm read history at Peterhouse, Cambridge, and received his doctorate in history from Trinity College, Cambridge. He was a Fellow and College Lecturer of Gonville and Caius College, Cambridge, before becoming a political and foreign affairs journalist for The Spectator and the Daily Telegraph.

He stopped being a journalist in 1995 to become a writer and academic, being appointed as a Visiting Fellow of St Antony's College, Oxford, for two years. He became a Fellow of the Royal Society of Literature (FRSL) in 1997 and a Fellow of the British Academy (FBA) in 2001. He was knighted in the 2014 New Year Honours for services to scholarship, journalism, and European history.

== Early life and education ==
Malcolm was born on 26 December 1956. He was educated at Eton College as a King's Scholar and studied history at Peterhouse, Cambridge, between 1974 and 1978. He received his PhD in history while he was at Trinity College, Cambridge.

== Career ==
Malcolm was a Fellow and college lecturer at Gonville and Caius College, Cambridge, from 1981 to 1988. He was a political columnist (1987–1991), then the foreign editor (1991–1992) of The Spectator, and a political columnist for the Daily Telegraph (1992–1995). He was jointly awarded the T. E. Utley Prize for Political Journalism in 1991.

In 1995, he gave up journalism to become a full-time writer. In 1996, he was a Visiting Fellow of St Antony's College, Oxford, and in 1999 he was a lecturer at Harvard University. He has been a senior research fellow of All Souls College, Oxford, since 2002. He served on the advisory board of the conservative magazine Standpoint.

Malcolm used to be the chairman of the Bosnian Institute, London, and president of the Anglo-Albanian Association.

== Honours ==
Malcolm became a Fellow of the Royal Society of Literature (FRSL) in 1997 and a Fellow of the British Academy (FBA) in 2001.

He is a Member of the Academy of Sciences and Arts of Kosovo, and an honorary fellow of both Peterhouse, Cambridge (since 2010), and Trinity College, Cambridge (since 2011).

In 2013, he was awarded the British Academy Medal for his book Thomas Hobbes: Leviathan.

Malcolm was knighted in the 2014 New Year Honours for services to scholarship, journalism, and European history. In 2016, he was awarded the Presidential Gold Medal of the League of Prizren by the president of Kosovo, Hashim Thaçi. He received an honorary Doctor of Laws from Harvard University in 2026.

== Works ==
=== Books ===
Malcolm is the author of

- De Dominis, 1560–1624: Venetian, Anglican, Ecumenist, and Relapsed Heretic (1984), about Marco Antonio de Dominis
- George Enescu: His Life and Music ( Toccata Press, 1990), which has been translated into several languages, about George Enescu
- Bosnia: A Short History (New York University Press, 1994), which has been translated into several languages
- Origins of English Nonsense (HarperCollins, 1997)
- Kosovo: A Short History (New York University Press, 1998)
- Books on Bosnia: A Critical Bibliography of Works relating to Bosnia-Herzegovina Published Since 1990 in West European Languages (with Quintin Hoare) (Bosnian Institute, 1999)
- Aspects of Hobbes (Oxford University Press, 2002)
- John Pell (1611–1685) and His Correspondence with Sir Charles Cavendish: The Mental World of an Early Modern Mathematician (with Jacqueline Stedall) (Oxford University Press, 2005)
- Agents of Empire: Knights, Corsairs, Jesuits and Spies in the Late Sixteenth-Century Mediterranean World (Oxford University Press, 2015)
- Useful Enemies: Islam and The Ottoman Empire in Western Political Thought, 1450-1750 (Oxford University Press, 2019)
- Rebels, Believers, Survivors: Studies in the History of the Albanians (Oxford University Press, 2020)
- Forbidden Desire in Early Modern Europe. Male-Male Sexual Relations, 1400-1750 (Oxford University Press, 2024).

Malcolm edited Reason of State, Propaganda, and the Thirty Years War: An Unknown Translation by Thomas Hobbes (Clarendon Press, 2007), The Correspondence of Thomas Hobbes (1994) and Thomas Hobbes's Leviathan (three volumes, Oxford University Press, 2012), for which he was awarded a British Academy Medal. He has also contributed more than 40 journal articles or chapters in books since 2002.

=== Journalism ===
Malcolm has written many articles for newspapers, magazines and journals. Other than his work for The Spectator, the Daily Telegraph and Standpoint he has had articles published in The Guardian, The Sunday Telegraph, the New York Times, the Washington Times, Time and the Daily Mail, among other publications. He has also contributed book reviews mainly to The Sunday Telegraph. He has contributed to a number of journals including Foreign Affairs and the New York Review of Books.

== See also ==
- Kosovo Myth
- Great Migrations of the Serbs
- Serbian historiography
- My Blood My Compromise
