= Marko Attila Hoare =

British historian (born 1972)

- Born: 1972 (age 53–54)
- Citizenship: UK
- Education: Robinson College, Cambridge; University of Cambridge (BA 1994; later MA), Yale University (MPhil 1997, PhD 2000)
- Known for: attribution to the study of the history of Serbia and Bosnia and Herzegovina; war crimes investigation
- Parents: Quintin Hoare (father); Branka Magaš (mother)
- Awards: 2010 CNAB Award
- Scientific career
- Fields: History, journalism
- Workplaces: University of Cambridge, Kingston University, Sarajevo School of Science and Technology

Marko Attila Hoare (born 1972) is a British historian of the former Yugoslavia who also writes about current affairs, especially Southeast Europe, including Turkey and the Caucasus. Hoare is a Full Professor and Acting Dean of the Department of Political Science and International Relations at the University Sarajevo School of Science and Technology, in Sarajevo.

== Early life and education ==
Hoare is the son of the British translator Quintin Hoare and the Croatian journalist Branka Magaš.

Hoare has been studying the history of the former Yugoslavia since 1993. In the summer of 1995, he acted as translator for the humanitarian aid convoy to the Bosnian town of Tuzla, organised by Workers' Aid for Bosnia, a movement of solidarity in support of the Bosnian people. His degrees in History are a BA (1994; later converted to an MA) from the University of Cambridge and a MPhil (1997) and PhD from Yale University (2000).

According to Hoare, between 1997 and 1998 he lived and worked in Sarajevo, Bosnia and Herzegovina. From 1998 to 2001, he lived in Belgrade, Serbia.

== Career ==
He was resident in Serbia during the Kosovo War of 1999. He later worked at the International Criminal Tribunal for the former Yugoslavia. Hoare was a research assistant at the Bosnian Institute in London (founded by his father Quintin), a British Academy Postdoctoral Research Fellow, a research fellow of the History Faculty of the University of Cambridge, and a Reader at Kingston University in London. He has been an associate professor at the Sarajevo School of Science and Technology since 2017.

He was Greater Europe Section Co-director and then European Neighbourhood Section Director for the Henry Jackson Society (HJS) from the institute's foundation in 2005. In 2012, he resigned from the HJS, saying it had become "an abrasively right-wing forum with an anti-Muslim tinge", and over his opposition to associate director Douglas Murray's views.

Hoare was also an advisory editor of Democratiya, and he is a member of the editorial board of Spirit of Bosnia, an international, interdisciplinary, bilingual, online journal. His blog, "Greater Surbiton", describes itself as devoted to commentary and analysis, with a particular focus on South East Europe. He is a signatory of the Euston Manifesto. He has written for Left Foot Forward website, Prospect and Standpoint magazines, and The Guardian newspaper.

In 2013, Hoare criticised the position of then Conservative London Mayor Boris Johnson, arguing in favour of arming the opponents of Bashar al-Assad in Syria.

=== ICTY engagements ===
Hoare served as a research officer and war crimes investigator at the International Criminal Tribunal for the former Yugoslavia. He was also an expert witness for the court there. He participated in the drafting of the indictment against former president Slobodan Milošević.

== Books ==
The particular focus of Hoare's writing has been on the history of Bosnia and Herzegovina and Serbia:

- How Bosnia Armed: The Birth and Rise of the Bosnian Army (London: Saqi, 2004) – examines the history of the Bosnian Army and Bosnian internal politics in the 1990s.
- Genocide and Resistance in Hitler's Bosnia: The Partisans and the Chetniks, 1941–1943 (London: Oxford University Press, 2006) – looks at the conflict between the Yugoslav Partisans and Chetniks in Bosnia during World War II.
- The History of Bosnia: From the Middle Ages to the Present Day (London: Saqi, 2007) – book focuses in particular on the history of national identity in Bosnia.
- The Bosnian Muslims in the Second World War: A History (London: C. Hurst & Co., 2013) – looks at the role of the Bosnian Muslims in World War II.
- Serbia: A Modern History (London: C. Hurst & Co., 2024) – looks at the history of Serbia from premodern times up to 1941.

== Awards ==
Hoare is the recipient of the 2010 Congress of North American Bosniaks (CNAB) award for outstanding contributions to the advancement of history. The award is recognition for his lifelong dedication to presenting the historical truth and standing up against genocide denial.

== See also ==
- Srđa Pavlović
