= My Blood My Compromise =

- Directed by: Nuhi de Stani
- Produced by: Nuhi de Stani
- Starring: Albin Kurti (Prime Minister of Kosovo)
- Cinematography: Drea Cooper
- Edited by: Nuhi de Stani
- Music by: Jeff Vilensky / Michael Brennan
- Distributed by: National Film Network
- Release date: 2007
- Running time: 62 min.
- Country: United States
- Language: Albanian / Serbian / English
- Budget: 85,000

My Blood My Compromise is a feature documentary film on Kosovo by Albanian-American director Nuhi de Stani.

== Synopsis ==
The director, Nuhi de Stani uses a wide range of interviews to delve into the very complicated conflict in Kosovo during the demise of Yugoslavia. The story is told in three parts: a brief history, the crimes against humanity and the 2008 Kosovo declaration of independence. The history aspect of the story is told by author of Kosovo: A Short History, Noel Malcolm. The crimes against humanity aspect is told through Luljeta Selimi, who created a women's foundation that provides help to women and children who were raped during the conflict. The quest for independence is channeled through Albin Kurti, a leading activist and leader of the Vetëvendosje movement and current serving prime minister of Kosovo.

== Film Festivals ==
1. Titanic Budapest International Film Festival World Premiere
2. Brooklyn International Film Festival United States Premiere
3. Milano Film Festival Italian Premiere
4. Montreal Human Rights Film Festival Canadian Premiere

== Release and distribution ==
The final version of My Blood My Compromise was released in January, 2010 through the National Film Network.

== Critical reviews ==
My Blood My Compromise has been reviewed and recommended by K. Fennessy of Video Librarian Magazine. "...The filmmaker also talks with a U.N. representative, a member of the Serbian parliament, experts on ethnic cleansing, and ordinary Kosovans who recount their experiences fighting and defending themselves against the Serbs (one mother remains too traumatized to speak). The destruction of property and disruption of lives would force many into Albania and Montenegro, leaving Kosovo a broken territory inhabited by people suffering from physical and emotional scars. DVD extras include deleted scenes and the short documentary, “In a Word, ‘Democracy’,” which looks at the treatment of Macedonian Albanians in the wake of independence."
