= Paul R. Williams (professor of law) =

American legal scholar

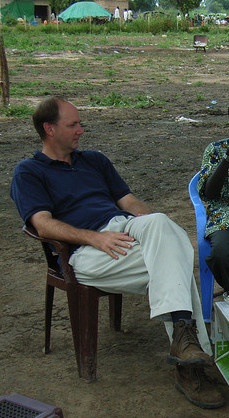
- Paul Williams in 2012.
- Education: University of California, Davis (AB); Stanford Law School (JD); University of Cambridge (PhD)
- Scientific career
- Fields: Peace negotiation
- Workplaces: Public International Law & Policy Group

Paul R. Williams is a professor at American University, where he teaches in the School of International Service and the Washington College of Law, holding the Rebecca Grazier Professorship in Law and International Relations. He is the president and co-founder of the Public International Law & Policy Group (PILPG), a Non-Governmental Organization (NGO) which provides pro bono assistance to countries and governments involved in peace negotiations, drafting post-conflict constitutions, and prosecuting war criminals, and was consultant at the London based Bosnian Institute for years.

== Career ==
Williams has assisted nearly two dozen states and sub-state entities in major international peace negotiations, legislation drafting and policy planning, and post-conflict constitution building through his work as president and co-founder of the Public International Law & Policy Group. Williams is regarded as a social entrepreneur for his practical and innovative approach to providing pro bono assistance to clients. He has served as a delegation in the Dayton Agreement negotiations (Bosnia-Herzegovina), Rambouillet Agreement and Paris negotiations (Kosovo), Ohrid Agreement negotiations (Macedonia), and Podgorica/Belgrade negotiations for Serbia and Montenegro. He has also advised parties to the Key West negotiations for Nagorno-Karabakh, the Oslo and Geneva negotiations for the Sri Lankan Civil War, the Georgian–Abkhazian conflict negotiations, and the Somalia peace talks.

Williams has advised over two dozen governments and parties in Africa, Asia, and Europe including Afghanistan, Bosnia, Iraq, Kosovo, Montenegro and Nagorno-Karabakh as well as the President of Macedonia, President of Estonia, Foreign Minister of Montenegro, and the Foreign Minister of East Timor. Advised topics include drafting and implementation of post-conflict constitutions, issues of state recognition, self-determination, and state succession, and border sea demarcations and negotiations. Williams has testified before the U.S. Congress and provided expert commentary in the British House of Commons on peace negotiations.

Prior to his work with PILPG, Williams was representative for the Office of the Legal Adviser at the 45th meeting of the International Whaling Commission.

Williams received his A.B. from the University of California, Davis in 1987, his J.D. from Stanford Law School in 1990, and his PhD from the University of Cambridge, where he was a Fulbright Research Scholar. In 2010, Paul was awarded the American University School of International Service’s Scholar/Teacher of the Year, the School’s highest honor for faculty.

== Bibliography ==
=== Books ===
- Lawyering Peace (Cambridge University Press, 2021).
- Research Handbook on Post-Conflict State Building (Edward Elgar Press, 2020). Co-edited with Milena Sterio.
- The Syrian Conflict’s Impact on International Law (Cambridge University Press, 2020). Co-authored with Michael P. Scharf and Milena Sterio.
- The Law of International Organizations: Problems and Materials, Third Edition (Carolina Academic Press, 2013). Co-authored with Michael P. Scharf
- Shaping Foreign Policy in Times of Crisis: The Role of International Law and the State Department Legal Adviser (Cambridge University Press, 2010). Co-authored with Michael P. Scharf.
- Peace with Justice? War Crimes and Accountability in the Former Yugoslavia (Rowman and Littlefield, 2002). Co-authored with Michael P. Scharf.
- Indictment at the Hague: The Milosevic Regime and Crimes of the Balkan Wars (New York University Press, 2002). Co-authored with Norman Cigar.
- International Law and the Resolution of Central and East European Transboundary Environmental Disputes (Macmillan/St. Martins Press, 2000). Awarded the Elizabeth Payne Cubberly Research Prize.
- "Treatment of Detainees" (Henry-Dunant Institute, 1990).

=== Selected chapters, reports, and book reviews ===
- "Twenty-Four Years On: The Yugoslavia and Rwanda Tribunals’ Contributions to Durable Peace", in The Legacy of Ad Hoc Tribunals in International Criminal Law: Assessing the ICTY’s and the ICTR’s Most Significant Legal Accomplishments (2019). Co-authored with Kimberly Larkin.
- "Drafting in Doha: An Assessment of the Darfur Peace Process and Ceasefire Agreements", in Monopoly of Force, The Nexus of DDR and SSR (2011). Co-authored with Matthew T. Simpson.
- "Is it true that there is no right of self-determination for Kosova?", in The Case for Kosova: Passage to Independence (2006). Co-authored with Jennifer Ober.
- "Was the former 1999 NATO intervention an illegal war against the Former Republic of Yugoslavia?", in The Case for Kosova: Passage to Independence (2006). Co-authored with Catherine Croft.
- "Achieving a Final Status Settlement for Kosovo", published by the Center for Strategic & International Studies (2003). Co-authored with Janusz Bugajski and R. Bruce Hitchner.
- "Simulating Kosovo: Lessons for Final Status Negotiations", published by the U.S. Institute of Peace (2002). Co-authored with James Hooper.
- "The Role of Justice in Peace Negotiations", Post Conflict Justice (2002). Edited by M. Cherif Bassiouni.
- "Trying the Butcher of Omarska", 10 Criminal Law Forum 147 (1999). Book Review.
- "Creating International Space for Taiwan: The Law and Politics of Recognition", 32 New England Law Review 801 (1998).
- "Legal Issues", A Global Agenda: Issues Before the 53rd General Assembly of the United Nations (1998).
- "Illegal Annexation and State Continuity: The Case of the Incorporation of the Baltic States by the USSR", American Journal of International Law (2005). Co-authored with Yoonie Kim. Book Review.
- "Constitutionalizing Globalization: The Postmodern Revival of Confederal Arrangements", American Journal of International Law 93(2): 561 (1999). Co-authored with Ramzi Nemo. Book Review.
- "The Politics and Policy of Deep Seabed Mining", American Journal of Comparative Law 40(1): 276–288 (1992). Book Review.

=== Law journal articles ===
- "The Origin Story of the Public International Law & Policy Group", Case Western Reserve Journal of International Law (2021). Co-authored with Isabela Karibjanian. Forthcoming.
- "Documentation for Accountability", Case Western Reserve Journal of International Law (2020). Co-authored with Jessica Levy.
- "Lawyering Peace: Infusing Accountability into the Peace Negotiations Process", Case Western Reserve Journal of International Law (2020).
- "Atrocities Documented, Accountability Needed: Finding Justice for the Rohingya through the ICC and Independent Mechanism", Harvard Human Rights Journal (2019).
- "Use of Force in Humanitarian Crises: Addressing the Limitations of U.N. Security Council Authorization", Case Western Reserve Journal of International Law (2019). Co-authored with Sophie Pearlman.
- "The Peace vs. Justice Debate and the Syrian Crisis", ILSA Journal of International & Comparative Law (2018). Co-authored with Lisa Dicker and C. Danae Paterson.
- "Lawfare: A War Worth Fighting", Case Western Reserve Journal of International Law (2011).
- "Earned Sovereignty: Bridging the Gap between Sovereignty and Self-Determination", Stanford Journal of International Law (2004). Co-authored with Francesca Jannotti Pecci.
- "Preemption in the 21st Century: What are the Legal Parameters?", ISLA Journal of International and Comparative Law (2004). Co-authored with Scott Lyons & Tali Neuwirth.
- "Earned Sovereignty: An Emerging Conflict Resolution Approach", ILSA Journal of International and Comparative Law (2004). Co-authored with Karen Heymann.
- "The Role of Justice in the Former Yugoslavia: Antidote or Placebo for Coercive Appeasement", Case Western Reserve Journal of International Law (2003).
- "Earned Sovereignty: The Political Dimension", 31 Denver Journal of International Law & Policy 355 (2003). Co-authored with James Hooper.
- "Earned Sovereignty: The Road to Resolving the Conflict Over Kosovo's Final Status", 31 Denver Journal of International Law & Policy 387 (2003).
- "Resolving Sovereignty-Based Conflicts: The Emerging Approach of Earned Sovereignty", Denver Journal of International Law & Policy (2003). Co-authored with Michael P. Scharf & James R. Hooper.
- "The Functions of Justice and Anti-justice in the Peace-building Process", Case Western Reserve Journal of International Law (2003). Co-authored with Michael Scharf.
- "Coercive Appeasement: The Flawed International Response to the Serbian Rogue Regime", 36 New England Law Review 825 (2002). Co-authored with Karina M. Waller.
- "Doing Justice During Wartime: Why Military Tribunals Make Sense", Policy Review (2002). Co-authored with Abraham D. Sofaer.
- "Report of the Committee of Experts on Nation Rebuilding in Afghanistan", New England Law Review (2002). Co-authored with Michael P. Scharf.
- "State Succession to Debts and Assets: The Modern Law and Policy", Harvard International Law Journal (2001). Co-authored with Jennifer Harris.
- "NATO Intervention on Trial: The Legal Case that Was Never Made", Human Rights Review (2000). Co-authored with Michael Scharf.
- "The Norm of Justice and the Negotiation of the Rambouillet/Paris Peace Accords", Leiden Journal of International Law (2000).
- "The Northern Ireland Peace Agreement: Evolving the Principle of Self-Determination", Leiden Journal of International Law 155 (1999).
- "Can International Legal Principles Promote the Resolution of Central and East European Transboundary Environmental Disputes?", 7 Georgetown International and Environmental Law Review 421 (1995).
- "Bankruptcy in Russia: The Evolution of a Comprehensive Russian Bankruptcy Code", 21 Review of Central and East European Law 511 (1995). Co-authored with Paul Wade.
- "International Environmental Dispute Resolution: The Dispute Between Slovakia and Hungary Concerning Construction of the Gabcikovo and Nagymaros Dams", 19 Columbia Journal of Environmental Law 1 (1994).
- "State Succession and the International Financial Institutions: Political Criteria or Sound Management?", 43 International and Comparative Law 132 (1990). Co-authored with Steve McHugh.

=== Policy articles and op-eds ===
- "Why the US Should Recognize the Rohingya Genocide", The Diplomat (2021). With Michael P. Scharf and Milena Sterio.
- "Responding to the military coup in Myanmar: what business can and should do", LSE Business Review (2021). With Anna Triponel.
- "Bougainville’s Faustian Bargain", The Diplomat (2019). With Carly Fabian.
- "Reviving peace talks in Yemen: What comes next", The Atlantic Council MENASource (2018). With Jessica Levy.
- "The Season of Self-Determination: An Analysis of Catalonia’s Independence Referendum", The Huffington Post (2017). With Margaux J. Day.
- "The Kurdish Referendum – Is it Legal", The Huffington Post (2017). With Margaux J. Day.
- "Humanitarian Intervention in Syria: R2P Strikes Back", The Huffington Post (2017). With Elsie Meyer.
- "American Policy on Syria at a Crossroads: What Now?", The Huffington Post (2017). With C. Danae Paterson.
- "How the UN General Assembly Can Create Accountability for Atrocity Crimes in Syria", The Huffington Post (2016). With C. Danae Paterson and Elise Meyer.
- "The Colombian Referendum: A Lesson on Peace Without Justice", The Huffington Post (2016). With Tiffany Sommadossi.
- "Tear It All Down: The Significance Of The al-Mahdi Case And The War Crime Of Destruction Of Cultural Heritage", The Huffington Post (2016). With C. Danae Paterson.
- "U.S. Explores Options To Support A Democratic, Peaceful South Sudan", The Huffington Post (2016). With C. Danae Paterson.
- "How the Voters of Catalonia May Change Europe", The Atlantic Council New Atlanticist (2014). With Roushani Mansoor.
- "Guest Post: Williams & Mansoor–Bangladesh’s War Crimes Tribunal Isn’t About Justice", Opinio Juris (2013). With Roushani Mansoor.
- "The Legal Case for Using Force to Prevent a Government from Employing Chemical Weapons to Commit Mass Atrocities", The Atlantic Council MENASource (2013). With J. Trevor Ulbrick and Jonathan P. Worboys.
- "Preventing Atrocity Crimes in Syria: The Responsibility to Protect" The Atlantic Council MENASource (2012). With J. Trevor Ulbrick and Jonathan P. Worboys.
- "Deals with the Devil: Thorny Diplomacy in Sudan", The National Interest (2011). With Morton Abramowitz.
- "Word Games: The UN and Genocide in Darfur", The Jurist (2005). With Jamal Jafari.
- "Iraq's Political Compact", The Boston Globe (2005).

"A Defining Moment for Kosovo", The Baltimore Sun (2004). With Bruce Hitchner.

- "Peace Before Prosecution?", The Washington Post (2003). With Ambassador Morton Abramowitz.
- "Yes, Military Commissions Are Appropriate", Knight Ridder (2003). With Abraham Sofaer.
- "The Case Against Amnesty for Hussein", Chicago Tribune (2003).
- "With Its Acts of War, Al-Qaida Yielded Rights", The Baltimore Sun (2002). With Richard Hubbell.
- "Prosecute Terrorists on a World Stage", Los Angeles Times (2001). With Michael Scharf.
- "Rebuild Afghanistan – or Terrorists Will Find Fertile Ground for Growth", The Washington Times (2001). With Bruce Hitchner.
- "The West Must Act to Avoid a Bosnia Redux", The Wall Street Journal Europe (1998). With Norman Cigar.
- "Indict Serbia's Milosevic for Crimes Against Humanity", International Herald Tribune (1998). With Michael Scharf.
- "Reward Serbs with the Town of Brcko? Don't Do It", The Christian Science Monitor (1998). With Norman Cigar.
- "Serbia After Milosevic", The Christian Science Monitor (1997). With Norman Cigar.
- "For the Peach in the Balkans, Indict Milosevic Now", International Herald Tribune (1997). With Norman Cigar.
- "Promise Them Anything", The Weekly Standard (1995).
- "UN Members Share Guilt for the Genocide in Bosnia", The Christian Science Monitor (1995).
- "Une Lourde Violation du Droit International", Le Monde (1995).
- "Why the Bosnian Arms Embargo is Illegal", The Wall Street Journal Europe (1995).
