= Anglo-Albanian Association =

The Anglo-Albanian Association is an association established in 1913 by Aubrey Herbert under the name Albanian Committee. In 1918 this committee evolved into Anglo-Albanian Society and then into the Anglo-Albanian Association.

== Objectives ==
The Anglo-Albanian Committee was originally founded to support the Albanian cause in Great Britain and to promote recognition of the Independent Albania. The current Association holds regular events on Albanian history, culture and music. It also disseminates information on a range of Albania-related events and developments and produces an e-newsletter, the Anglo-Albanian Gazette.

== Members ==
Some of the members were Edith Durham, Lord Lamington and Dervish Duma.

After 1985 the Chairman of the Anglo-Albanian Association was Harry Hodgkinson, British writer, journalist, and naval intelligence officer. Its current president is Noel Malcolm and Vice President James Hickson, great-nephew of Edith Durham.
