= Agreement on Sub-Regional Arms Control =

Arms limitation agreement signed in 1996

The Agreement on Sub-Regional Arms Control – Annex 1-B (Serbo-Croatian: Sporazum o subregionalnoj kontroli naoružanja), also known as the Florence Agreement, is an annex to the Dayton Agreement intended to control military activity within Bosnia and Herzegovina as well as Serbia, Montenegro, and Croatia. It was signed and activated on June 14, 1996, in Florence, Italy and was amended in 2006 and 2007 to accommodate additional nation-building. With the agreement's purpose laid out in Article I, the succeeding Article II restricted military actions between the following parties: Republic of Bosnia and Herzegovina, the Federation of Bosnia and Herzegovina, and the Republika Srpska. Article III limited arms imports between these three entities during the aftermath (90 to 180 days) of the Bosnian War. Article IV is an arms control agreement limiting procurement of certain combat-offensive vehicles, artillery and aircraft executed by all four signatory countries.

All signatories underwent military disarmament within Article V, reducing or destroying armored combat vehicles, artillery, and other military assets. Article VI and Article VII limited extraterritorial arms export and decommissioning as means of disarmament. This disarmament concluded by 1997. Article VIII established a regional disclosure, data exchange, and military notifications program. It was under the supervision of the OSCE from 1995 to 2015, thereafter leaving the enforcement to the signatory countries. During 1996 the main two parties were known as Federal Republic of Yugoslavia (succeeded by Serbia and Montenegro) and the two entities of Bosnia and Herzegovina (the Federation of Bosnia and Herzegovina and the Republica Srpska).

== Table ==
Arms Control Limits of Article IV (2007 amendment)
Signatory	Battle tanks	Combat vehicles	Artillery	Combat aircraft	Combat helicopters
Bosnia and Herzegovina	410	340	1,500	62	21
Serbia	948	786	3,375	143	46
Montenegro	77	64	375	12	7
Croatia	410	340	1,500	62	21

Source: Florence Agreement on Sub-Regional Arms Control – Annex 1-B

== See also ==
- Treaty on Conventional Armed Forces in Europe
- 2020s European rearmament
