= Harry Hodgkinson (writer) =

- Born: 15 March 1913; Kirkham, Lancashire, England
- Died: 2 October 1994 (aged 81); London, England
- Occupations: Writer, journalist and naval intelligence officer
- Known for: Chairman of the Anglo-Albanian Association

Harry Hodgkinson (15 March 1913 – 2 October 1994), born Kirkham, Lancashire, was a British writer, journalist, naval intelligence officer and expert on the Balkans.

From the age of 16, he started writing for the Blackpool Times, Yorkshire Observer and Bradford Telegraph. In 1936, he walked from Charing Cross to Jerusalem and published stories from his travels in The Christian Science Monitor, The Times and The Guardian. He was employed by Naval Intelligence at the Admiralty and worked under Ian Fleming, in charge of Albania and Yugoslavia. After the war he was adviser to the Director of Naval Intelligence regarding the Soviet satellite states. In 1954 he published Adriatic Sea, and in 1955 Tito between East and West. He was in correspondence with Edith Durham for many years and received some sixty letters from her. He was appointed from 1985 to be a chairman of the Anglo-Albanian Association.

During his career he supported the Albanian cause and took up strong anti-Serb and anti-Bulgarian positions. He left many unpublished manuscripts about the Balkans.

== Works ==
- West and East of Tito, Gollancz (1952)
- The Adriatic Sea, Macmillan (1956)
- Scanderbeg, The Centre for Albanian Studies/Learning Design; foreword by David Abulafia (1999), ISBN 978-1-873928-13-4
