= Dayton Agreement =

1995 treaty ending the Bosnian War

Dayton Peace Agreement
General Framework Agreement for Peace in Bosnia and Herzegovina
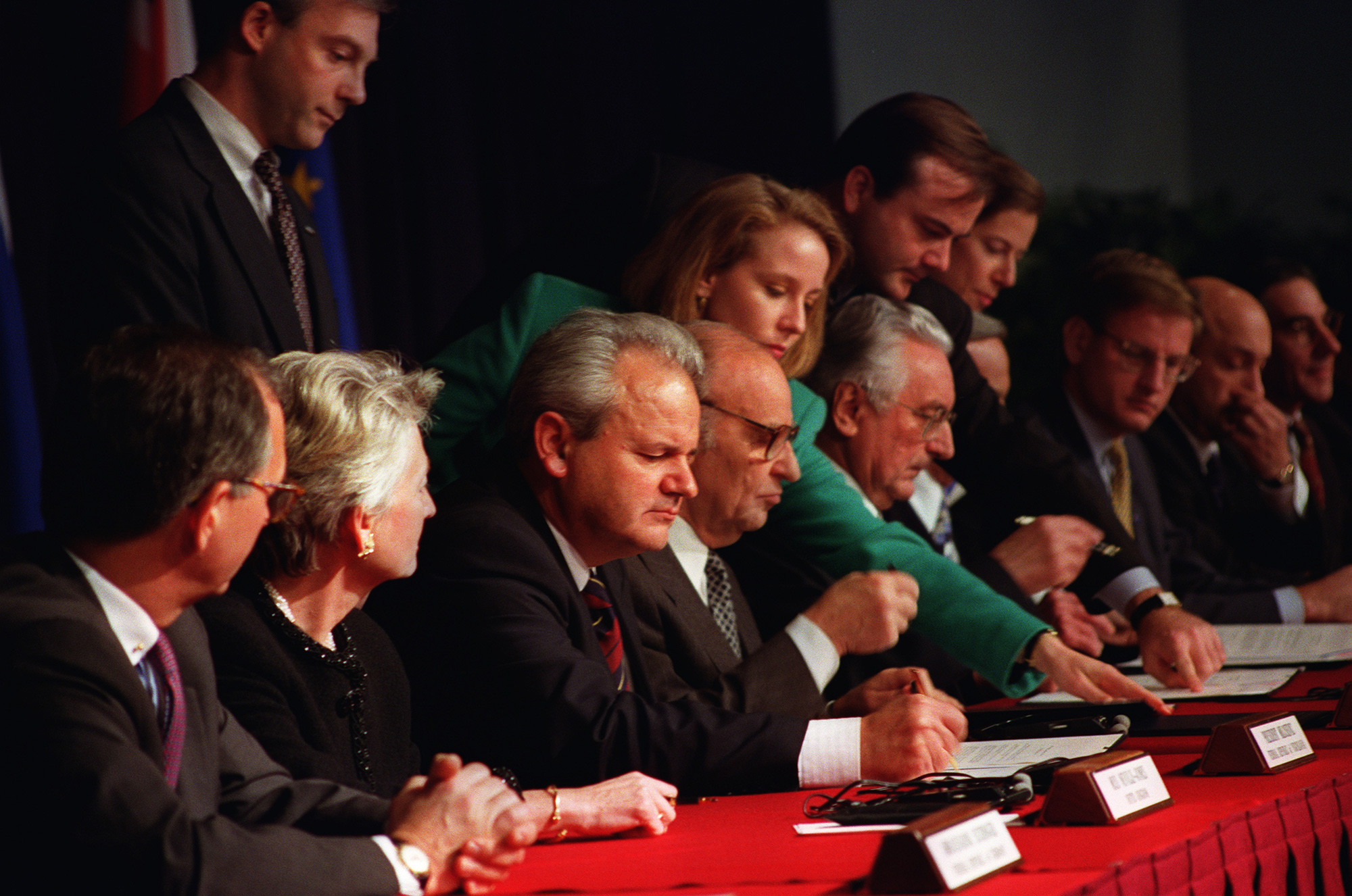
- Seated from left to right: Slobodan Milošević, Alija Izetbegović, Franjo Tuđman initialling the Dayton Peace Accords at the Wright-Patterson Air Force Base on 21 November 1995.
- Drafted: 10 August 1995
- Signed: 21 November 1995 (initialed on)
- Location: Wright-Patterson Air Force Base, Dayton, Ohio, U.S.
- Signatories: (Republic of Bosnia and Herzegovina) Alija Izetbegović; (Croatia) Franjo Tuđman; (Federal Republic of Yugoslavia) Slobodan Milošević Witnessed by: (European Union) Felipe González; (France) Jacques Chirac; (Germany) Helmut Kohl; (Russia) Viktor Chernomyrdin; (United Kingdom) John Major; Bill Clinton
- Parties: Republic of Bosnia and Herzegovina; Croatia; Federal Republic of Yugoslavia; Witnessed by: European Union; France; Germany; Russia; United Kingdom; United States
- Language: Bosnian, Croatian, English and Serbian

The General Framework Agreement for Peace in Bosnia and Herzegovina, also known as the Dayton Agreement or the Dayton Accords (Serbo-Croatian: Dejtonski mirovni sporazum / Дејтонски мировни споразум), and colloquially known as the Dayton (Serbo-Croatian: Dejton / Дејтон), is the peace agreement ending the three-and-a-half-year-long Bosnian War, an armed conflict part of the larger Yugoslav Wars. It was signed on 21 November 1995 in Dayton, Ohio, United States, at Wright-Patterson Air Force Base. It was re-signed ceremonially in Paris, France, on 14 December 1995.

The warring parties agreed to peace and to a single sovereign state known as Bosnia and Herzegovina composed of two parts: the largely Serb-populated Republika Srpska and mainly Croat-Bosniak-populated Federation of Bosnia and Herzegovina. Bosnia and Herzegovina entered into the related arms control treaty, the Florence Agreement, in 1996 under the Accords. The Dayton followed the Washington Agreement, signed the year prior, in collective efforts to delineate the country's geography.

Praised for establishing lasting peace in Bosnia and Herzegovina, the Dayton Accords have also been criticized for creating an unduly complex political governance system in the country, as well as entrenching regional ethnic cleansing.

== Negotiation and signature ==
Video of the signing of the Dayton Agreement

Though basic elements of the Dayton Agreement were proposed in international talks as early as 1992, these negotiations were initiated following the unsuccessful previous peace efforts and arrangements, the August 1995 Croatian military Operation Storm and its aftermath, the government military offensive against the Republika Srpska, conducted in parallel with NATO's Operation Deliberate Force. During September and October 1995, world powers (especially the United States and Russia), gathered in the Contact Group, pressured the leaders of the three sides to attend settlement negotiations; Dayton, Ohio was eventually chosen as the venue.

Talks began with an outline of key points presented by the US in a team led by National Security Adviser Anthony Lake in visits to London, Bonn, Paris and other European stops 10 – 14 August 1995. These included Sochi, to consult Russian Foreign Minister Andrei Kozyrev. Lake's team handed off to a separate US inter-agency group led by Assistant Secretary of State Richard Holbrooke, who went on to negotiate with Balkan leaders in their capitals. The Holbrooke crew conducted five rounds of intense shuttle diplomacy from August to October, including short conferences in Geneva and New York that resulted in the parties' adoption of principles for a settlement on 8 and 26 September respectively.

The Dayton conference took place from 1–21 November 1995. The main participants from the region were the president of the Republic of Serbia Slobodan Milošević (whom the Bosnian Serbs had previously empowered to represent their interests), President of Croatia Franjo Tuđman, and President of Bosnia and Herzegovina Alija Izetbegović with his Foreign Minister Muhamed Šaćirbeg.

The peace conference was led by US secretary of state Warren Christopher, and negotiator Richard Holbrooke with two co-chairmen in the form of EU Special Representative Carl Bildt and the First Deputy Foreign Minister of Russia Igor Ivanov. A key participant in the US delegation was General Wesley Clark. The head of the UK's team was Pauline Neville-Jones, political director of the Foreign and Commonwealth Office. The UK military representative was Col Arundell David Leakey. Paul Williams, through the Public International Law & Policy Group (PILPG), served as legal counsel to the Bosnian Government delegation during the negotiations.

Holbrooke spoke of the "immense difficulty of engaging the Bosnian government in a serious negotiation".

The secure site was chosen in order to remove all the parties from their comfort zone, without which they would have little incentive to negotiate; to reduce their ability to negotiate through the media; and to securely house over 800 staff and attendants. Curbing the participants' ability to negotiate via the media was a particularly important consideration. Holbrooke wanted to prevent posturing through early leaks to the press.

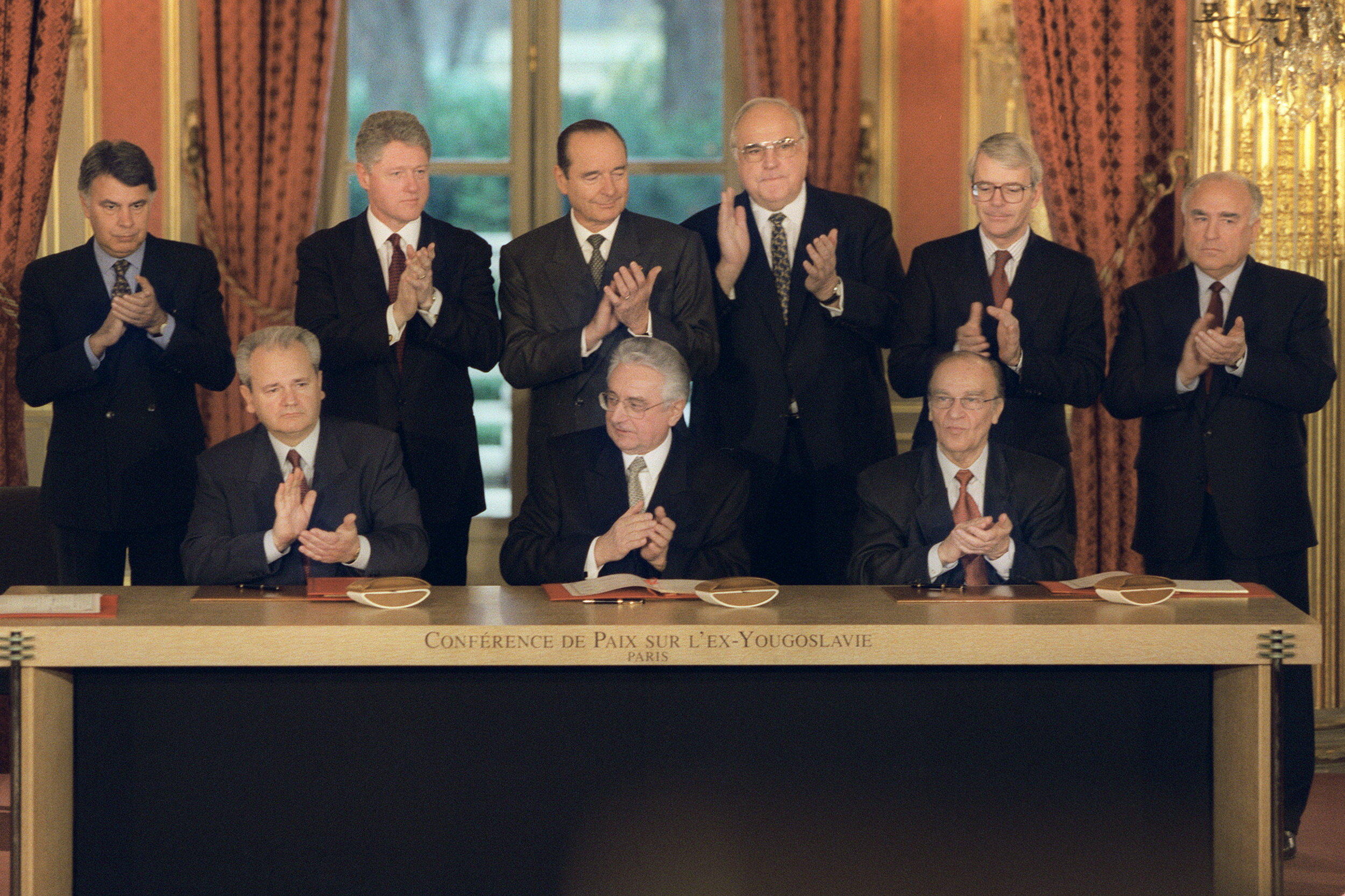
The ceremonial signing of the Agreement in Paris, France.

After having been initialed (signed legally) in Dayton, Ohio, on 21 November 1995, the agreement was signed ceremonially in Paris on 14 December 1995 and witnessed by President of the European Council Felipe González (the prime minister of Spain), French president Jacques Chirac, US president Bill Clinton, UK prime minister John Major, German chancellor Helmut Kohl and Russian prime minister Viktor Chernomyrdin.

== Content ==
The agreement's main purpose is to promote peace and stability in Bosnia and Herzegovina and to endorse regional balance in and around the former Yugoslavia (Article V, annex 1-B).

The present political divisions of Bosnia and Herzegovina and its structure of government were agreed upon (Annex 4). A key component of this was the delineation of the Inter-Entity Boundary Line to which many of the tasks listed in the Annexes referred.

The State of Bosnia Herzegovina is composed of the Federation of Bosnia-Herzegovina and of the Republika Srpska. Bosnia and Herzegovina is a complete state, as opposed to a confederation; no entity or entities could ever be separated from Bosnia and Herzegovina unless by due legal process. Although highly decentralised in its entities, it would still retain a central government, with a rotating state presidency, a central bank and a constitutional court.

The agreement mandated a wide range of international organizations to monitor, oversee and implement components of the agreement. The NATO-led IFOR (Implementation Force) was responsible for implementing military aspects of the agreement and deployed on 20 December 1995, taking over the forces of the UNPROFOR. The Office of the High Representative was charged with the task of civil implementation. The Organization for Security and Co-operation in Europe was charged with organising the first free elections in 1996.

=== Constitutional Court decision ===
On 13 October 1997, the Croatian 1861 Law Party and the Bosnia-Herzegovina 1861 Law Party requested the Constitutional Court of Bosnia and Herzegovina to annul several decisions and to confirm one decision of the Supreme Court of the Republic of Bosnia and Herzegovina and, more importantly, to review the constitutionality of the General Framework Agreement for Peace in Bosnia and Herzegovina since it was alleged that the agreement violated the Constitution of Bosnia and Herzegovina in a way that it undermined the integrity of the state and could cause the dissolution of Bosnia and Herzegovina. The Court reached the conclusion that it is not competent to decide the dispute in regards to the mentioned decisions since the applicants were not subjects that were identified in Article VI.3 (a) of the Constitution on those who can refer disputes to the Court. The Court also rejected the other request:

the Constitutional Court is not competent to evaluate the constitutionality of the General Framework Agreement as the Constitutional Court has in fact been established under the Constitution of Bosnia and Herzegovina in order to uphold this Constitution ... The Constitution of Bosnia and Herzegovina was adopted as Annex IV to the General Framework Agreement for Peace in Bosnia and Herzegovina, and consequently there cannot be a conflict or a possibility for controversy between this Agreement and the Constitution of Bosnia and Herzegovina.

It was one of the early cases in which the Court had to deal with the question of the legal nature of the Constitution. By making the remark in the manner of obiter dictum concerning the Annex IV (the Constitution) and the rest of the peace agreement, the Court actually "established the ground for legal unity" of the entire peace agreement, which further implied that all of the annexes are in the hierarchical equality. In later decisions the Court confirmed that by using other annexes of the peace agreement as a direct base for the analysis, not only in the context of systematic interpretation of the Annex IV. However, since the Court rejected the presented request of the appellants, it did not go into details concerning the controversial questions of the legality of the process in which the new Constitution (Annex IV) came to power and replaced the former Constitution of the Republic of Bosnia and Herzegovina. The Court used the same reasoning to dismiss the similar claim in a later case.

== Territorial changes ==
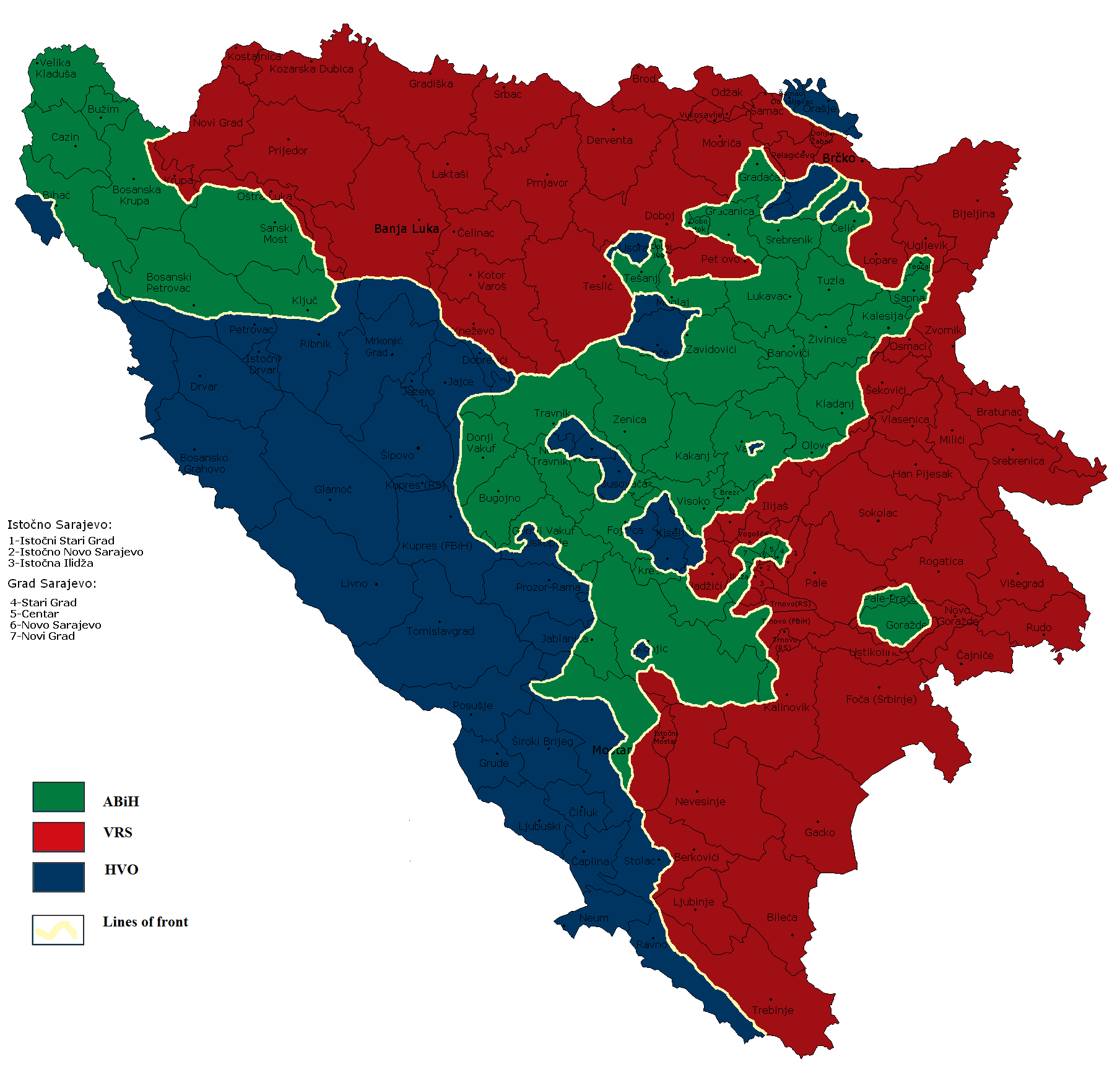
Bosniak, Croat and Serb militarily-held areas in 1995 before the signing of the Dayton Peace Agreement

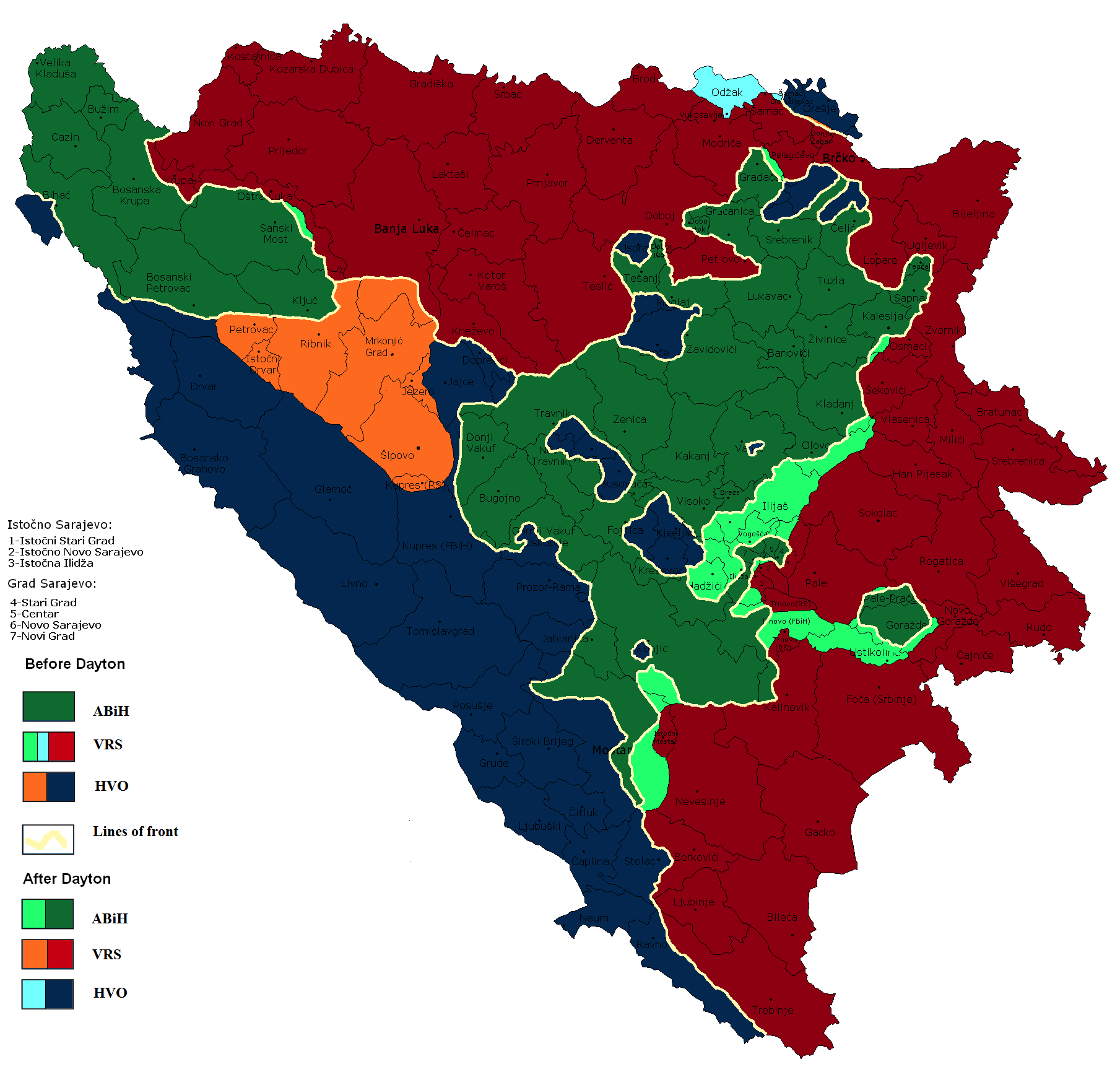
Territorial changes.

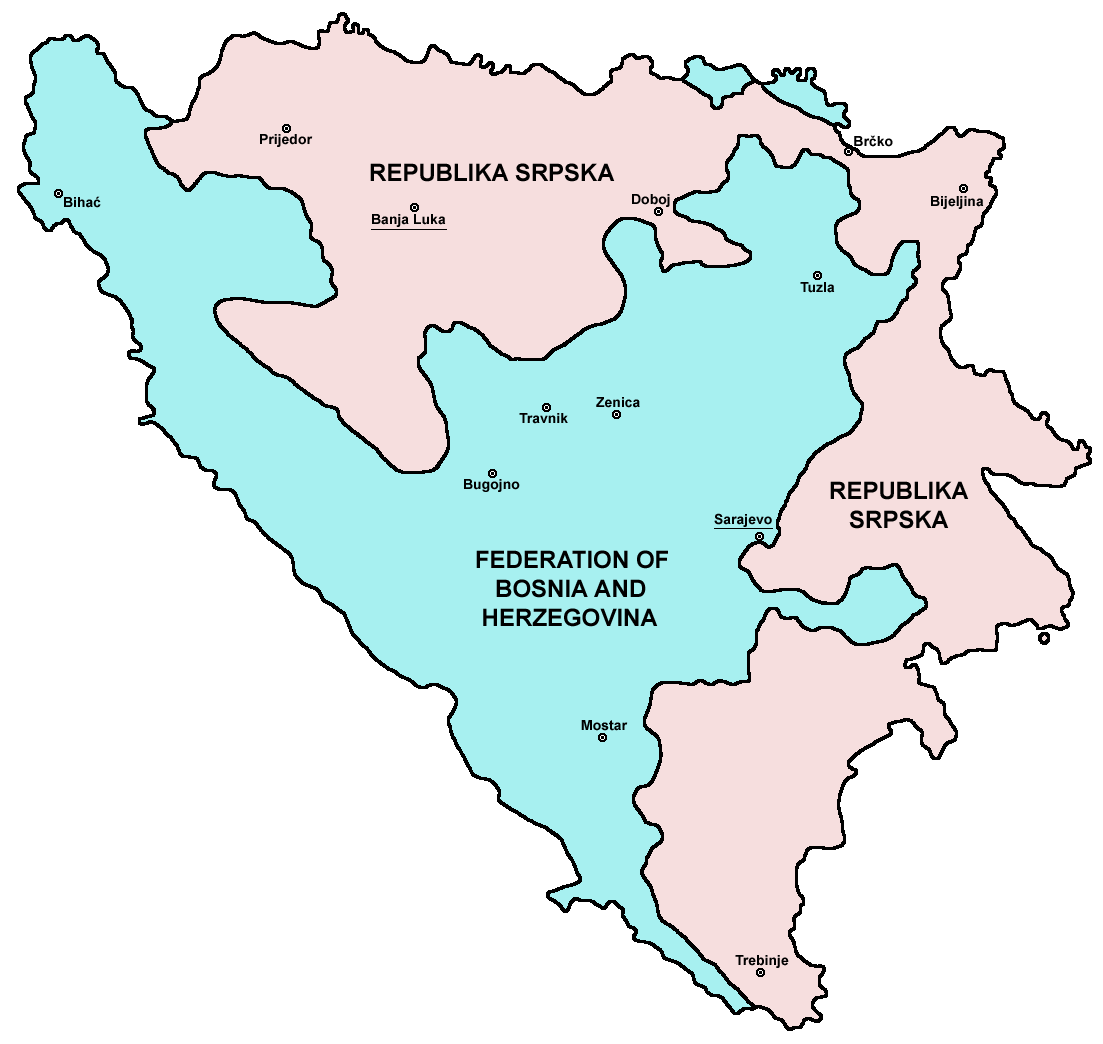
Political division of Bosnia and Herzegovina after the Dayton Agreement.

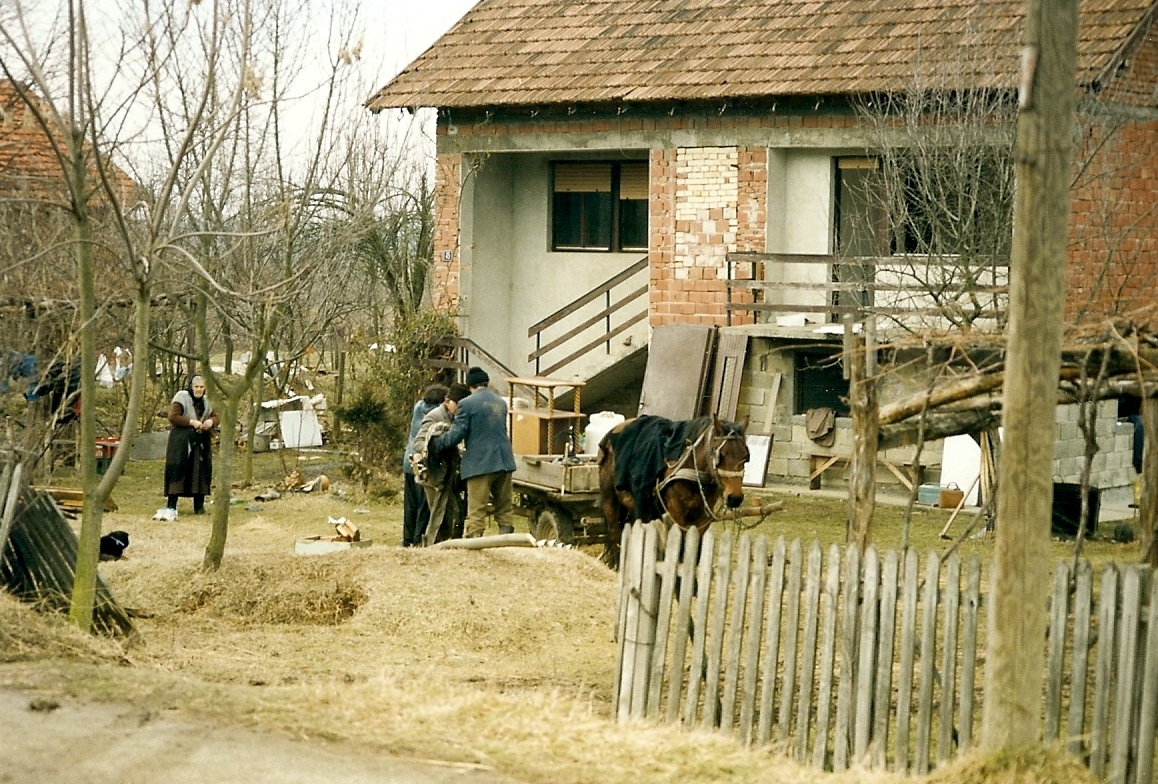
Serb families leave their homes due to regulations in the Dayton agreement from 1995. Picture taken near the town of Modriča, northeastern Bosnia

Before the agreement, Bosnian Serbs controlled about 46% of Bosnia and Herzegovina (23,687 km^{2}), Bosniaks 28% (14,505 km^{2}) and Bosnian Croats 25% (12,937 km^{2}).

Bosnian Serbs got large tracts of mountainous territories back (4% from Bosnian Croats and some small amounts from Bosniaks), but they had to surrender Sarajevo and some vital Eastern Bosnian/Herzegovian positions. Their percentage grew to 49% (48% by excluding the Brčko District, 24,526 km^{2}).

Bosniaks got most of Sarajevo and some important positions in eastern Bosnia and Herzegovina while they lost only a few locations on Mount Ozren and in western Bosnia. Their percentage grew to 30%, and they greatly improved the quality of the land. Large tracts of prewar Bosniak (and Bosnian Croat) inhabited lands remained under Bosnian Serb control.

Bosnian Croats gave most (4% of BiH territories) back to the Bosnian Serbs (9% of today's RS) and also retreated from Una-Sana Donji Vakuf (in Central Bosnia) afterward. A small enlargement of Posavina (Odžak and parts of Domaljevac) did not change the fact that after Dayton Bosnian Croats controlled just 21% of Bosnia and Herzegovina (10,640 km^{2}), compared to more than 25% prior to Dayton. One of the most important Bosnian Croat territories (Posavina with Bosanski Brod, Bosanski Šamac, Derventa) was left out of Bosnian Croat control.

=== Control of Republika Srpska ===
- About 89.5% (22,059 km^{2}) was under control of Bosnian Serbs
- About 9% (2,117 km^{2}) of today's territories of Republika Srpska was controlled by Bosnian Croat forces; mainly in municipalities of Šipovo, Petrovac, Istočni Drvar, Jezero, Kupres (RS) and part of Banja Luka municipality
- About 1.5% (350 km^{2}) of today's territories of Republika Srpska was controlled by Bosniak forces, mainly some villages in Ozren (Doboj and Petrovo), western Bosnia (Krupa na Uni and parts of Novi Grad and Oštra Luka).

=== Control of Federation of Bosnia and Herzegovina ===
- About 53% (13,955 km^{2}) of the Federation of Bosnia and Herzegovina was under Bosniak control.
- About 41% (10,720 km^{2}) of the Federation of Bosnia and Herzegovina was under the control of Bosnian Croats.
- About 6% (1,435 km^{2}) was under control of Bosnian Serbs.

==== Cantons ====
Herzeg-Bosnian Canton (Canton 10):

- was almost completely under control of Bosnian Croats (4,924 km^{2})
- Bosniaks controlled some points east of Kupres (10 km^{2})

Una-Sana Canton:

- was almost completely under control of Bosniaks (3,925 km^{2})
- Bosnian Croats controlled some mountain passes on the southern parts of Bosanski Petrovac and Bihać municipalities (200 km^{2})

West Herzegovina Canton:

- was completely under Bosnian Croat control (1,362 km^{2})

Herzegovina-Neretva Canton:

- was divided, more than half was under Bosnian Croat control (2,525 km^{2})
- northern and central parts were under Bosniak control (1,666 km^{2})
- eastern mountains were under Bosnian Serb control (210 km^{2})

Central Bosnia Canton:

- was divided, a bit more than a third was under Bosnian Croat control (1,099 km^{2})
- rest was under control of Bosniaks (2,090 km^{2})

Zenica-Doboj Canton:

- was largely under Bosniak control (2,843 km^{2})
- there were some small enclaves like Žepče, Usora under Bosnian Croat control (400 km^{2})
- eastern mountains were under Bosnian Serb control (100 km^{2})

Tuzla Canton:

- was largely under Bosniak control (2,544 km^{2})
- there were some villages in Gradačac municipality under Bosnian Croat control (5 km^{2})
- and some villages in Doboj and Gračanica municipalities under Bosnian Serb control (100 km^{2})

Posavina Canton:

- was mostly under Bosnian Croat control (205 km^{2})
- Bosnian Serbs controlled Odžak and parts of Domaljevac municipalities (120 km^{2})

Bosnian Podrinje Canton:

- was mostly under Bosniak control (405 km^{2})
- Bosnian Serbs controlled areas which linked it with Sarajevo (100 km^{2})

Sarajevo Canton:

- was mostly under Bosnian Serbs control (800 km^{2})
- while Bosniaks controlled some southern suburbs and most of the city itself (477 km^{2})

Brčko District was divided;

- Bosniaks controlled most of its southern parts (200 km^{2})
- Bosnian Serbs its northern parts (193 km^{2})
- While Bosnian Croats controlled the rest, part near Orašje municipality and two enclaves on southern parts of municipality (100 km^{2})

== Appraisals ==
The immediate purpose of the agreement was to freeze the military confrontation and prevent it from resuming. It was therefore defined as a "construction of necessity".

The Dayton Agreement was aimed at allowing Bosnia and Herzegovina to move from an early post-conflict phase through reconstruction and consolidation, adopting a consociational power-sharing approach. Scholars such as Canadian professor Charles-Philippe David calls Dayton "the most impressive example of conflict resolution". American scholar Howard M. Hensel states that "Dayton represents an example of a conflict resolution negotiation that was successful. However, Patrice C. McMahon and Jon Western write that "As successful as Dayton was at ending the violence, it also sowed the seeds of instability by creating a decentralized political system that undermined the state's authority".

High Representative Wolfgang Petritsch argued in 2006 that the Dayton framework has allowed the international community to move "from statebuilding via institutions and capacity-building to identity building", putting Bosnia and Herzegovina "on the road to Brussels".

The Dayton Agreement has been the subject of criticism since its inception, including:

- A complicated government system – As part of the Dayton agreement, Bosnia was divided regionally between two "Entities" within a consociational democracy, which was established to ensure the political representation and power of all sides. This can lead to an unproductive government in that every important issue is deadlocked within the central government as each party is championing opposing priorities that are based on ethnic policies and not shared ideals.
- Dependency and control of international actors – Dayton was very much an international vision, led by the United States who supported an end to the war, but that did not allow Bosnian leaders to negotiate an ending to the war, therefore leaving no incentive in the afterward peacebuilding process and no area for leaders to discuss the underlying root causes of the conflict. International actors also played an extensive role in shaping the postwar agenda in Bosnia. The international community invests millions of dollars in BiH yearly through NGOs. However, this stifles the impact of local actors and the development of civil society. Instead, the international community should invest in local actors, youth activists, and democratization projects. The influx of NGOs and international actors to kick start investment in the country post war also failed to kick start the economy, with Bosnia suffering from poor economic growth (2% in 2015). The lack of economic development has been attributed to poor coordination between international actors and lack of consideration for local capacity.
- Ending the war but not promoting peace – The primary aim of Dayton was to stop the war, but the agreement was only meant to be a temporary measure while a long-term plan was developed. The Dayton Agreement was the 35th attempt at a ceasefire following 34 other failed attempts. While Dayton has halted the conflict and there has not been a resurgence of violence, the stability in the conflict does not give an accurate assessment of peace. There is negative peace in BiH, meaning there is no open conflict or violence. However, there is no positive peace, as conditions that eliminate the causes of violence have not been reached. There is still currently an international military presence, EUFOR Althea, responsible for overseeing compliance with aspects of the Dayton Agreement. The Dayton Agreement provided peace by re-establishing and codifying division. Enforcing such peace can be seen as highlighting the still deep rooted tensions in the country, with Dayton covering the cracks of a fractured society that could be plunged back into conflict as soon as military forces left.
- Consociational Democracy – The Dayton Agreement established a consociational democracy in Bosnia and Herzegovina. This means that each group is ensured representation and power. This incentivized the end of the Bosnian War, but first requires collaboration or reconciliation for the government to function. Bosnia and Herzegovina operates with a three-member president role. There is a Croat, Bosniak, and Serb president. Similar quotas and rules apply for the two legislative bodies.
- Entrenching territorialized ethnicity - The Agreement was underpinned by a territorialized definition of ethnicity that divided Bosnia and Herzegovina into three constitutive nations and two distinct entities based on ethno-nationalist identities.

According to survey results from a 2020 study, "in each of the three main ethnic groups of Bosnia, more people would have voted for Dayton than against it."

== Disappearance of the Serbian and Bosnian copy ==
The copy that belonged to the Federal Republic of Yugoslavia (now Serbia) is believed to have disappeared or burned during the NATO bombing of 1999 or in October 2000 when it allegedly disappeared during the chaotic protests and popular overthrow of the regime of Slobodan Milošević, during which government buildings and archives were looted. Despite the original text being physically lost, the Federal Assembly of Yugoslavia officially ratified the Dayton Peace Agreement in December 2002, seven years after it was signed in Paris, in order to formally demonstrate that Belgrade held no territorial ambitions toward Bosnia and Herzegovina.

On 13 February 2008, the head of the presidency of Bosnia-Herzegovina Željko Komšić said that the 1995 Bosnian copy Dayton Agreement was lost from the presidency's archive. High Representative for Bosnia-Herzegovina Miroslav Lajčák said: "I don't know whether the news is sad or funny". On 16 November 2009 the French Foreign Ministry delivered a new certified copy of the Dayton agreement to the French embassy in Sarajevo. The copy was later transferred to the Ministry of Foreign Affairs of Bosnia-Herzegovina. The stolen 1995 copy was found in 2017 in a private residence in Pale, resulting in the arrest of the person who was trying to sell it.

== See also ==
- Washington Agreement
- Split Agreement
- Peace plans offered before and during the Bosnian War
- Agreement on Sub-Regional Arms Control (Dayton Accords)
- Proposed secession of Republika Srpska
- Constitutional reform in Bosnia and Herzegovina
- Erdut Agreement
