= Thomas Emmert =

Thomas Allan Emmert, also known as Tom Emmert, is an American historian who is professor of history at Gustavus Adolphus College in Minnesota.

Emmert trained at St. Olaf College, Oxford University and Stanford University, where he received his PhD in 1973. He specializes in Balkan studies. He has written works about Yugoslavia, Serbia and Kosovo.

Together with Charles Ingrao, Emmert is the project associate director of Scholars' Initiative, aimed at questions on the Yugoslav wars, including 250 scholars from 28 countries. He authored Confronting the Yugoslav Controversies as a result of seven years of the project.

== Works ==
- Emmert, Thomas A. (1981). "Kosovo: Development and impact of a national ethic". Nation and Ideology: 61–86.
- Emmert, Thomas A. (1989). "The Kosovo Legacy". Serbian Studies. 5 (2): 5–32.
- Emmert, Thomas A. (1990). Serbian Golgotha: Kosovo, 1389. Columbia University Press. ISSN 0070-8100.
- Emmert, Thomas A. (1991). "The battle of Kosovo: early reports of victory and defeat". Kosovo: legacy of a medieval battle (1): 19–40.
- Emmert, Thomas A. (1996). "Milos Obilic and the Hero Myth". Journal of the North American Society for Serbian Studies. 10: 1–9.
- Emmert, Thomas A. (1997). "Serbian Golgotha". East European Monographs. VII.
- Emmert, Thomas A. (1999). Ženski Pokret: the feminist movement in Serbia in the 1920s.
- Emmert, Thomas A. (2003). "A Crisis of Identity: Serbia at the End of the Century". Yugoslavia and its Historians: Understanding the Balkan Wars of the 1990s: 295-.
- Emmert, Thomas A. (2004). "Serbia and its Intellectuals: Introduction". Contemporary European History. 13 (2): 149-.
- Pavlović, Milivoje; Emmert, Thomas A.; Ingrao, Charles (2004). "Kosovo under autonomy, 1974–1990". Nationalities Papers. 32 (4): 49–79.
- Emmert, Thomas; Ingrao, Charles (2013) [2006]. Conflict in Southeastern Europe at the End of the Twentieth Century: A "Scholars' Initiative" Assesses Some of the Controversies. Routledge. ISBN 978-1-317-97015-6.

== Sources ==
- American Historical Association (2005). Directory of History Departments and Organizations in the United States and Canada. American Historical Association, Institutional Services Program.
