= Quintin Hoare =

British translator

- Born: 1938
- Died: 2025 (aged 86–87)
- Education: Oxford University
- Occupations: Literary translator and editor
- Spouse: Branka Magas
- Children: Marko Attila Hoare
- Awards: John Florio Prize; Scott Moncrieff Prize; Schlegel-Tieck Prize

Quintin Hoare (1938–2025) was a British leftist intellectual and literary translator from languages including Italian, French, German, Russian and Bosnian.

After studying Modern Languages at Oxford University, in 1962 Hoare joined the editorial board of New Left Review, serving as its managing editor from 1963 to 1979. He and his wife, the Croatian historian Branka Magas, eventually resigned in 1993. Hoare was a founding editor of the journal Labour Focus on Eastern Europe, a founding member in 1993 of the Alliance to Defend Bosnia-Herzegovina, and in 1997 became director of the Bosnian Institute.

Hoare edited the Pelican Marx Library, which ran to eight volumes. As a translator, he worked in several languages, winning major awards for his translations from Italian, French and German: the John Florio Prize in 1978/9 for Antonio Gramsci's Selections from Political Writings 1921–26, the Scott Moncrieff Prize in 1984 for Sartre's War Diaries, and the Schlegel-Tieck Prize in 1989 for Hermann Grab's short stories.

Hoare's son is the historian Marko Attila Hoare.
