= Bosnian Institute =

Bosnia-Herzegovina culture institute based in London

The Bosnian Institute was an organization founded by Quintin Hoare in July 1997 and first registered on 7 October 1997, as a United Kingdom Registered Charity. The institute was based in London, and headed by Dr. Quintin Hoare, who was a joint founding editor with Branka Magaš of published quarterly online magazine called Bosnia Report. It was principally devoted to, "educate people throughout the world and particularly in the United Kingdom about the history and culture of Bosnia-Herzegovina, its social economic, governmental, legal and cultural conditions, organizations and institutions", that is providing studying and information on history, politics, culture and education of Bosnia and Herzegovina, and the region of former Yugoslavia.

The Bosnian Institute was founded with a grant from the David and Lucile Packard Foundation, and was continually funded by this foundation and the Friends of the Bosnian Institute, alongside to other donors.

== Staff ==
The board of trustees was chaired by historian Sir Noel Malcolm elected a fellow of the British Academy, alongside Bojan Bujić of Magdalen College, Oxford, historian Brendan Simms, and journalist Melanie McDonagh. Director was Quintin Hoare, familiar with the region of former Yugoslavia and fluent in Serbo-Croatian, along French, German, and Italian. Associates were Nermin Mulalić, a lawyer from Sarajevo, who later worked at the Bosnian embassy in London; Helen Walasek, who has been deputy director of Bosnia and Herzegovina Heritage Rescue and an expert on the destroyed architectural heritage of Bosnia and Herzegovina and consultant for the Council of Europe on museums in the country; and editorial and administrative assistant was Vanda Teuta Vučičević.

Among the institute many consultants were likes of Ivo Banac, Professor of History and director of the Council on European Studies at Yale University; Norman Cigar, Professor of Strategic Studies at the US Marine Corps Command and Staff College, and a senior associate at the Public International Law and Policy Group, Washington DC; Paul Garde, Emeritus professor of Slav linguistics at the University of Provence and French expert on the former Yugoslavia; Branka Magaš historian; Paul Williams, Professor of Law and International Relations at the American University, Washington DC.
