= Zvornik massacre =

1992 mass killing during the Bosnian War

Coordinates: 44°23′3″N 19°6′9″E

Zvornik massacres
- Zvornik municipality on the map of Bosnia
- Location: Zvornik, Bosnia and Herzegovina
- Date: April–July 1992
- Target: Bosniak, Romani and other non-Serb civilians
- Attack type: Mass killing and ethnic cleansing
- Deaths: 491–700
- Perpetrator: Serb paramilitary groups

The Zvornik massacre refers to acts of mass murder and violence committed against Bosniaks and other non-Serb civilians in Zvornik by Serb paramilitary groups (Arkanovci, Territorial Defence units, White Eagles, Yellow Wasps) at the beginning of the Bosnian War in 1992. It was part of a wider campaign of ethnic cleansing in the Bosnian War: by one estimate, 40,000 Bosniaks were expelled from the Zvornik district.

It was the second city in Bosnia and Herzegovina that was forcefully taken over by Serb forces during the Bosnian War. A total of 3,936 people were killed or went missing in the Zvornik municipality between 1992 and 1995 (of which 2,017 were Bosniak civilians), according to the Research and Documentation Center in Sarajevo. The U.N. established International Criminal Tribunal for the Former Yugoslavia (ICTY) convicted seven Serb officials, who were found guilty of persecution, forcible transfer and/or deportation, murder, unlawful detention, torture (crimes against humanity) and wanton destruction, plunder of property (violations of law of war).

== Background ==
According to the 1991 census data, the district of Zvornik had a population of 81,111: 48,208 (59.4%) of which were Bosniaks and 30,839 (38%) were ethnic Serbs. A total of 14,600 people lived in the city of Zvornik, 8,942 (61.0%) of them were Bosniaks, 4,281 (29.2%) of the Serbian nationality, 74 (0.5%) of Croatian nationality, and 1,363 (9.3%) were defined as "others".

As a border town situated at the Bosnian-Serb Drina river, Zvornik was of great strategic importance. It is significant because Bosnia and Herzegovina and Serbia are linked at that point not only through a road bridge between the Zvornik urban area and the Karakaj industrial zone, and another one in Zvornik itself, but also via a railroad bridge between Karakaj and the town of Čelopek. It represents an important link along the Belgrade-Sarajevo line, as well as within the Belgrade-Tuzla line.

Officially, there was no garrison of the former JNA in the Zvornik district. The Zvornik region itself was controlled by the 17th Corps Tuzla. Up to the fall of 1991, the 17th Corps consisted of 3 brigades and one partisan brigade, and was part of the First Military District of Belgrade. After the re-organization of the JNA in the spring of 1992, it formally fell under the command of the Second Military District of Sarajevo, but most likely continued to be led by the First Military District of Belgrade.

By 1991–92, preliminary tank units (apparently from the abandoned Jastrebarsko garrison in Croatia) were stationed near Zvornik. By February or March 1992 (at the time of the referendum on independence), additional units of the former JNA-tank units and artillery and anti-aircraft positions were stationed in the Zvornik region. Initially, the tanks still carried the JNA emblems. It was only later that they were replaced by the Serbian flag and the coat-of-arms emblem. On the Serb side of the Drina river bank, various tank positions could be identified as well. Additional forces, including artillery, anti-aircraft weaponry, and tanks were being positioned there.

== Attack on Zvornik ==
=== Build-up ===
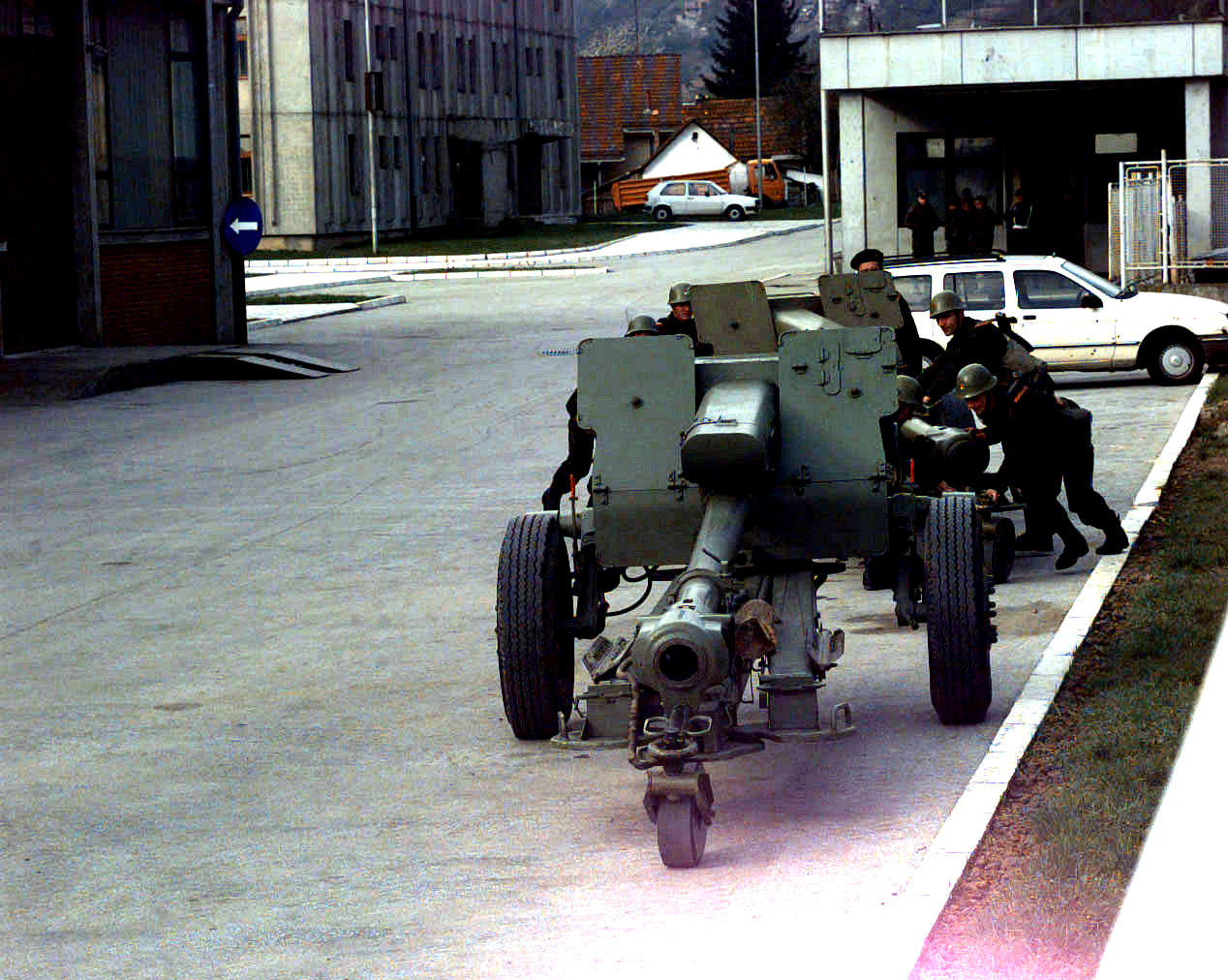
The Army of the Republika Srpska (VRS) soldiers of Headquarters 503rd Brigade, display two 122mm D-30 howitzers at a weapons storage site located in Zvornik, Bosnia-Herzegovina, during an inspection

The attack on Zvornik started on 8 April 1992, just a few days after the Serb seizure of Bijeljina. According to witness accounts, former JNA troops from the following garrisons were involved during the attack:

Tuzla garrison: some of the tanks used in Zvornik were part of the units which were transferred from Jastrebarsko (Croatia) to Tuzla.
Bijeljina garrison: The infantry divisions of the former JNA were reserve units of the mobilization base, Bijeljina.

Planes and helicopters which participated were reportedly from Tuzla. Prior to the attack, units from Novi Sad, Šabac, Sremska Mitrovica and Valjevo (Serbia) were partly stationed along the Serbian side of the Drina river bank, and partly on the Bosnian side. They further participated in the attack on Zvornik, operating from Serbian territory. They were equipped with machine-guns (M 52, M 65, M 66, M 70A, M 70B, M 72); hand grenade launchers (Zolja); kalashnikovs; MiG 21 and J-21 Jastreb with machine-guns and gunners; helicopters (Mil Mi-6 or Mil Mi-8 and others); and knives. Infantry units were not only composed of the «regular members» of the former JNA and of mobilized reserve forces, but also of «volunteers»

=== The attack ===
The military attack on Zvornik occurred on 8 April 1992. Later, there were sporadic military operations with units of the former JNA cooperating with paramilitary units. These operations mainly focused on the medieval fortress of Kulagrad, southwest of Zvornik, where some dozen resistance fighters were holding out. However, on 26 April, this fortress was conquered in a concerted attack by former JNA troops, with air support, and by paramilitary units. Immediately after the fall of Kulagrad, the town of Divić, situated south of Zvornik, was attacked. Divić was almost exclusively populated by Bosniaks and was situated at the hydro-electric power plant. The attack on the town was conducted both from the Serbian side and from Bosnian territory, using tank forces, artillery, and infantry units with portable mortars. JNA units and paramilitary units cooperated. Arkanovci operated in front-line positions, taking the city. Their core troops left the city after the successful attack to prepare a raid on the next city, Bratunac.

The attack began on the morning of 8 April, with mortar fire on the Bukovik and Meterize city districts, as well as on the Bosniak-held defence positions on the Debelo Brdo hill. It came from the artillery positions in Karakaj, from the Bosnian side before Meterize, and from the Serbian side of the River Drina (Mali Zvornik). First shots were fired in the Meterize suburb. This attack was mainly carried out by the heavy equipment of the JNA (artillery and tanks). There are also reports of Arkanovci snipers firing from Mali Zvornik on the opposite river bank, and of snipers aiming at residents from positions on highrise buildings in Zvornik itself. The Bosniak position on Debelo Brdo, however, fell on that same day and was occupied.

During the night there was heavy shelling of the town. The capture of the city did not begin until the following day, 9 April. In the morning, there were again negotiations with Arkan, which ended in an ultimatum for the surrender of weapons and the town by 8:00 a.m. At 8:00 a.m. artillery fire started again, followed by the capture of the town by the infantry. The Arkanovci assumed a leading role in the take-over of the city, proceeding from the north via the Bukovik and Meterize city districts heading for the city centre. In addition, infantry units of the JNA in cooperation with Serb volunteers (Šešeljevci, Beli Orlovi) took part in seizing the city. They approached the city primarily from the west, in a second wave. It was reported that on the very first day, as well as during the subsequent weeks, there were random executions, rapes, and massacres. In these, the units of the Šešeljevci, Beli Orlovi and the so-called "territorial defence" were also involved. On 10 and 11 April, Zvornik was captured. The Kulagrad fortress south of Zvornik and the town of Divić bordering Zvornik to the South had not yet been occupied.

On 9 April, artillery attacks on Kulagrad started as the attacking units were expecting major Bosniak resistance forces. Even before the attack, Serbian media reported that "several thousand Bosniak extremists" were hiding in Kulagrad. In fact, there were probably no more than a few dozen armed Bosniaks under the command of a former JNA officer who spontaneously organized a resistance movement with light equipment (small arms). From 11 April onward, there were almost daily attempts by small combat groups from various paramilitary units to capture the fortress. These attempts failed, however, despite the fact that Kulagrad was constantly under fire from mortars, anti- aircraft guns and tanks. The reason for this failure might be due to the apparent lack of coordination of the attacks, as well as deficiencies in the training of the infantry units involved. These settlements were captured by May.

== Aftermath ==
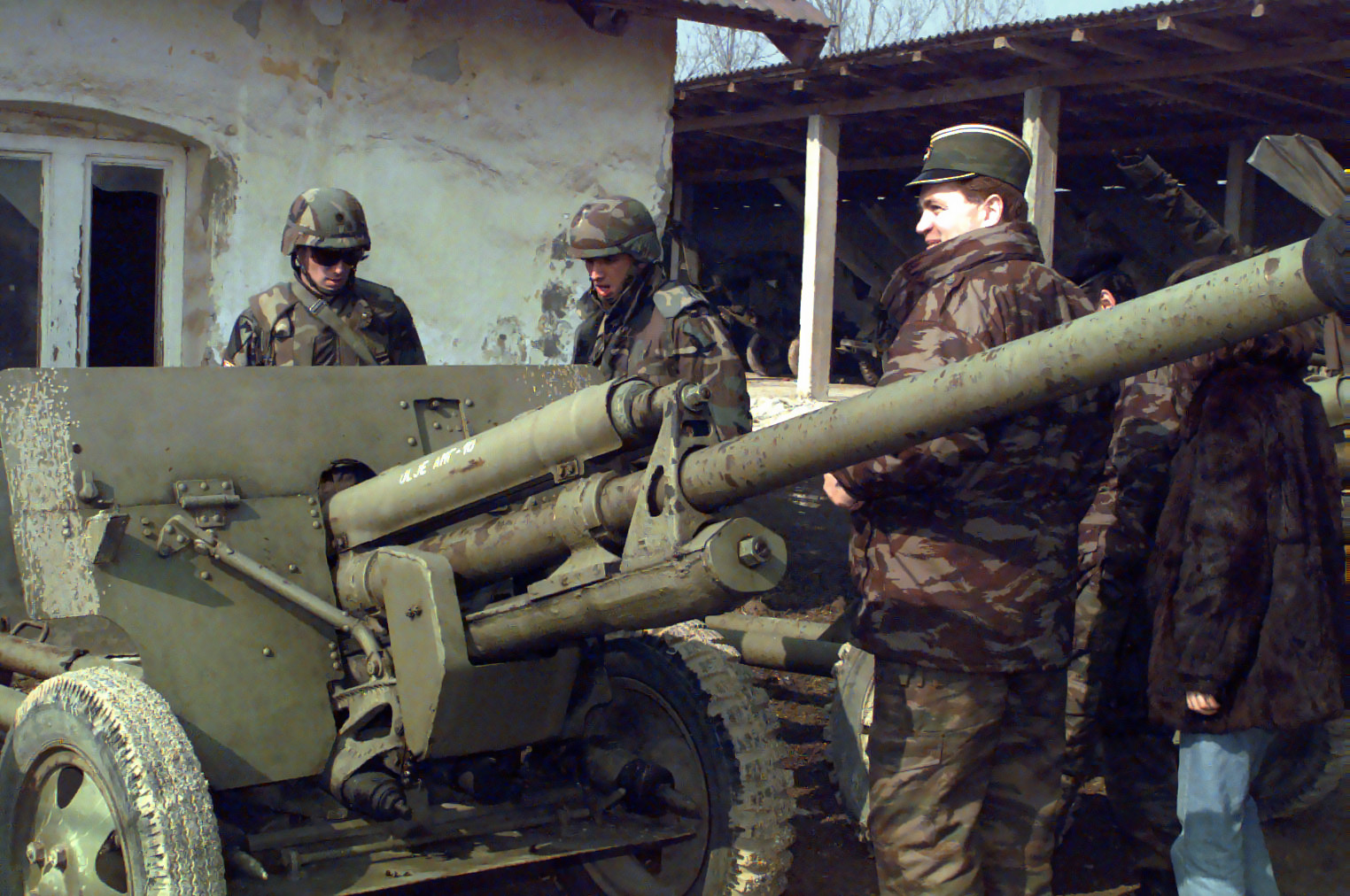
Col. Vinko Pandurević, Commander 1st Zvornik Brigade, Republic of Serbia Army, shows LTC Anthony Harriman, Squadron Commander, 3rd Squadron, 4th Cavalry Regiment, 2nd Brigade, 1st Armored Division, Baumholder, Germany, a ZIS-3 Towed Anti-tank Gun during an inspection of a Serbian cantonment area on 28 February 1996 during Operation Joint Endeavor

Around 10 or 11 April, the «ordinance on the introduction of the general work requirement», along with an extension of the deadline, was broadcast by Radio Zvornik. But this appeal was not followed, as there were still numerous paramilitary troops in town who were looting and terrorizing the locals. Therefore, the appeal was broadcast once more a few days later (approximately 15 or 16 April). The overall response to these appeals was however rather poor. The experiences of those who did follow the appeal to return to the workplace showed that the true purpose of this appeal, and of others that followed, was to monitor male Bosniak inhabitants.

Immediately after the occupation of the town, a night curfew was imposed which remained in force until the «ethnic cleansing» was completed. During the day, men were allowed to move around only with a permit issued by the Serbian police at Zvornik. Many of the men who went to Karakaj (or later to the police office in Zvornik) in order to apply for a «permit» were suddenly deported into one of the camps in the industrial district of Karakaj. While at the camp, they were subjected to severe torture and murder, in particular by members of the paramilitary troops whose quarters were partly in the same buildings as those in which the prisoners were detained. Many of the men, therefore, did not dare to pick up their passes themselves, but remained in hiding in houses. However, even persons with a pass were not safe from random aggressions by the numerous paramilitary units in town. It was reported by some witnesses that immediately upon leaving the police station, they had their passes taken away or torn into pieces by members of a paramilitary group. Some of them were attacked and deported into camps.

From the onset of the occupation, Bosniaks were prohibited from working, except for persons deemed indispensable (e.g. hospital personnel, who were not released until the end of May). Everyday life was dominated by the fact that maraudering paramilitary troops, who were not controlled by any authority, terrorized the Bosniak population of Zvornik.

=== Expulsion and organized deportation ===
After the expulsion of the Bosniak population by means of terror, the next step was to prepare the total expulsion of the inhabitants with the support of administrative measures. The first step had already been the appeal to return. The registration of property that was mandatory for all inhabitants, including the Serbian population, served above all the purpose of registering the male Bosniak population. For this reason, only men were eligible for registration, which had to be completed before the Serbian municipality or the Serbian militia, even if a property was originally registered under the wife's name. These registrations led to arrests and deportations to camps, apparently on the basis of pre-established lists.

An «agency for the exchange of houses» was set up, to which the Bosniak inhabitants were to transfer their houses. In return, the Bosniaks were promised houses belonging to Bosnian Serbs (e.g. in the Tuzla region) who supposedly had also assigned their homes to the agency. In order to make this ostensible offer to exchange houses more appealing, Serbian radio stations transmitted broadcasts regarding the successful exchange of homes by prominent Bosniak inhabitants. These exchanges were, in many cases, found out to be falsified or conducted under coercion.

Departure from the town was only possible on the condition that property was renounced and transferred to the Serbian District of Zvornik. These transfers were executed in cooperation with the police and paramilitary units, especially the Draganovci. Documents that had to be shown upon leaving the town included:

- a personal ID card, in which the date of the notice of change of address was entered by the authority.
- a permit which guaranteed the holder the freedom of movement on the territory of the Serbian District of Zvornik and the access to the territory of the FR Yugoslavia.
- a stub certifying the «change of address»

=== Atrocities at Čelopek cultural center ===
In June 1992, at least 163 Bosniak captives were victims of abuse, cruelty, torture, or murder in the Čelopek cultural center. They were without food or water for three days in the facility. On the Eid al-Adha Islamic holiday, the Bosnian Serb paramiliary commander Dušan (Repić) Vučković ordered between seven and ten men, including fathers and sons, to go on stage naked and perform a fellatio on each other. Then, some of the victims had their penis and ears cut off. Some were shot afterwards. Other men were ordered to lie on the ground, as the Serb paramilitary slit their throats and stabbed them with a knife in the chest. In other instances, the Serb paramilitary shot dozens of captives. The survivors had to take away the corpses and load them on a truck, and clean the blood traces on the ground.

== Legal proceedings ==
=== ICTY ===
The U.N. established International Criminal Tribunal for the Former Yugoslavia (ICTY) issued several indictments for crimes after the capture of Zvornik. In its verdicts, it found the Serb officials guilty of persecution, forcible transfer and/or deportation, murder, unlawful detention, torture (crimes against humanity) and wanton destruction, plunder of property (violations of law of war):

- Radovan Karadžić, former President of Republika Srpska, was sentenced to a life in prison.
- Mićo Stanišić, Minister of the Serbian Ministry of Internal Affairs in Bosnia and Herzegovina, was sentenced to 22 years in prison.
- Stojan Župljanin, Chief of the Regional Security Services Centre of Banja Luka; member of the Autonomous Region of Krajina (ARK) Crisis Staff, was sentenced to 22 years.
- Momčilo Krajišnik was sentenced to 20 years.
- Biljana Plavšić was sentenced to 11 years.
- Vojislav Šešelj was charged, but ultimately acquitted.
- Jovica Stanišić and Franko Simatović were included in a joint criminal enterprise, and sentenced each to 15 years in prison. The Tribunal concluded:

[Stanišić and Simatović] shared the intent to further the common criminal plan to forcibly and permanently remove the majority of non-Serbs from large areas of Croatia and Bosnia and Herzegovina.

It also concluded:

Consequently, the Appeals Chamber concludes that all reasonable doubt has been eliminated that crimes committed by the JNA, or forces working in coordination with it or subordinated thereto, during and after the takeover of Zvornik and prior to the 12 May 1992 are attributable to Slobodan Milošević, a joint criminal enterprise member.

The ICTY found that at least 491 people were killed in Zvornik in 1992: 85 persons on 30 May 1992 at the Drinjača school; 352 persons in June 1992 at Gero’s Slaughterhouse and Karakaj Technical School; 20 persons in June 1992 at the Karakaj Technical School; and 34 men at Čelopek Dom in June 1992. It further concluded:

The Chamber has found that the Municipalities of Banja Luka, Bijeljina, Bileća, Bosanski Šamac, Brčko, Doboj, Donji Vakuf, Gacko, Ilijaš, Ključ, Kotor Varoš, Pale, Prijedor, Sanski Most, Teslić, Vlasenica, Višegrad, Vogošća, and Zvornik were taken over in the months of April and June 1992, in accordance with the Variant A and B Instructions through the joint action of the RS MUP and other Serb forces, sometimes by advance hostile occupation of the main features in town by police forces. What followed was the mass exodus of Muslims, Croats, and other non-Serbs from their homes, communities, villages, and towns either provoked by violent means that entailed unlawful detention at the local SJBs and improvised camps and centres created out of local schools, gymnasia, cinema halls, cultural “doms”, and factories or by the imposition of harsh, unliveable conditions and discriminatory measures by Serb Forces, including members of the RS MUP, which led to the involuntary departure of the non-Serb population.

=== Regional courts ===
Vojin Vučković, commander of the Yellow Wasps, and his brother, Duško, were convicted in 1996 for killing of 17 civilians in Čelopek, a suburb of Zvornik, in 1992.

On 28 November 2005, the War Crimes Chamber in Belgrade began the trial of the "Zvornik Group" (Branko Grujić, Branko Popović, Dragan Slavković, Ivan Korać, Siniša Filipović, Dragutin Dragićević and Duško Vučković). They were accused of murdering at least 22 and forcefully deporting 1822 Bosniaks.

On 4 January 2010, Darko Janković was arrested in suspicion of killing at least 19 Bosniaks in Čelopek.

In June 2010, the Belgrade court brought a verdict and sentenced three people for war crimes in Zvornik. Dragan Slavković was sentenced to 12 years, Ivan Korać to 9 years and Siniša Filipović to three years in prison. The fourth suspect, Dragutin Dragičević, was freed of all charges. The three convicts were said to have tortured and killed at least 19 out of 162 illegally captured Bosniak civilians from Divič in the "Dom kulture" in Čelopek.

During the trial, witness B-24, a police officer and member of the Crisis staff in Zvornik, described how in April 1992 a person working in Zvornik under the pseudonym "Marko Pavlovic" made a phone call to JNA officers and within 24 to 48 hours, weapons and ammunition shipments would arrive for the "defense" of Zvornik. The ICTY brought the following verdict on Zvornik:

Zvornik was a municipality with a Bosniak-majority population. The Serb crisis staff mobilized the Serb members of the Territorial Defence in early April 1992. Paramilitary forces, including Arkan’s men, Šešelj’s men, Yellow Wasps, and Red Berets, began to arrive in the municipality. They had been invited by Branko Grujić, the president of the crisis staff. The police in the municipality was divided along ethnic lines. The Serb members of the Zvornik police relocated to Karakaj, where the Serb crisis staff was located. The Serb police and the paramilitary forces erected barricades throughout the municipality. Serb forces, including members of the police, the Territorial Defence, the Yugoslav People's Army, and paramilitary groups, then launched an armed attack against Zvornik town. The Serb civilian population had left town prior to the attack. Zvornik town was taken over by the Serb forces within a day. The Serbian flag was hoisted on top of the main town mosque. Many civilians were killed during the attack, and many others fled in fear. After the attack, Arkan’s men looted the homes and piled dozens of dead bodies, including the bodies of children, women, and elderly persons, onto trucks. More dead bodies lay in the streets.

On 1 October 2010, at the trials of Mićo Stanišić and Stojan Župljanin, which are accused of committing crimes between 1 April and 31 December 1992, in 20 municipalities throughout Bosnia and Herzegovina including Zvornik, a former member of the Serbian Democratic Party (SDS) testified that senior Bosnian Serb officials were informed of the atrocities that were being committed in Zvornik.

On 22 November 2010, Branko Grujić, a municipal official, and Branko Popović, a former territorial defense commander, were sentenced to 6 and 15 years respectively for their role in the "Zvornik group" that "imprisoned, inhumanely treated and killed around 700 people" in Zvornik from May to July 1992. The verdict determined that more than 1,600 civilians were forced to leave the Zvornik area. The bodies of 352 victims have been found and identified since the war. The War Crimes Prosecutor's Office said it would appeal the verdicts, stating that the sentences were "inadequate considering the responsibility of the accused, with regard to the number of victims, the mass and brutal character of the crimes."

== See also ==
- List of massacres in Bosnia and Herzegovina
- List of massacres of Bosniaks
- Bosnian genocide
