= Yellow Wasps =

Yellow Wasps Žute ose
- Active: April 12, 1992 – November 1993
- Allegiance: Republika Srpska
- Type: Paramilitary
- Garrison/HQ: Zvornik
- Engagements: Bosnian War

Commanders
- Commander: Vojin Vučković

The Yellow Wasps (Serbian: Жуте осе, Žute ose) were a Serbian paramilitary group which was active in the Bosnian War. It was headed by Vojin Vučković and Dušan Repić. The group was active in the Zvornik region. Vojin and his brother Duško were convicted in 1996 for the killing of 17 civilians in Čelopek, a suburb of the town of Zvornik, during the ethnic cleansing of the Bosniak population of the Drina valley in 1992. Four other members of the group have also been charged with war crimes.

== Formation ==
The Yellow Wasps paramilitary unit was allegedly formed on 12 April 1992 by Brana Grujić, president of the Zvornik Serbian Democratic Party (SDS), and a man known as Marko Pavlović, commander of the Zvornik Territorial Defense unit (TO), at a session of the Zvornik municipal assembly.

Consisting of about seventy men, the unit was commanded by Vojin Vučković, nicknamed "Žućo", born in 1962, an electrician from the town of Umka, near Belgrade, martial arts expert and former coach of the Serbian Interior Ministry judo team.

During the ICTY trial of Momčilo Krajišnik evidence was given that Marko Pavlović was an intelligence officer named Branislav "Branko" Popović, a major with the Zvornik Brigade of the Bosnian Serb Army who subsequently transferred to the Serbian army.

The "Yellow Wasps" paramilitary group was one of three paramilitary groups responsible for the "ethnic cleansing" and looting of Zvornik. They targeted not just Bosniaks, but anyone rich, including Serbs. They captured the Serbian mayor of Zvornik and tried to take control of the town using weapons from the territorial defence force. The Bosnian Serbs arrested them and sent them back to Serbia, but they soon returned.

== War crimes ==
The village of Divič, on the left bank of the river Drina, near Zvornik, was one of the first Bosnian towns to be ethnically cleansed of its Bosniak population of about 3000.

On 26 May 1992, the Bosniak residents were transferred out of the village on buses and kept overnight in Zvornik. The next day the women and children were driven to the Bosnian government-controlled city of Tuzla. The able-bodied men (a total of 180) were initially detained in the Drina stadium before being taken to makeshift prison in a former office building. Two days later on 29 May most of the men were transferred to the Dom Kultura community centre in Čelopek, others disappeared.

On 10 June 1992, Dušan Vučković and ten other soldiers visited the Dom Kultura. They forced fathers to commit sexual assaults on their sons and beat them dead or shot a total of fifteen prisoners. Survivors were given ten minutes to clean the blood, prisoners ordered to carry out the bodies were not seen again. Subsequently, Vučković and his companions visited Čelopek almost every night to beat, torture and kill prisoners. On 27 June 1992, Vučković fired a machine gun at prisoners at random, killing twenty-five. The prison was closed two days later, and eighty-four survivors were transferred via Zvornik to the Batković concentration camp, near Bijeljina.

== Arrests and trials ==
In August 1992 about seventy Yellow Wasp members were arrested and accused of robbing and murdering Serbian and Bosniak civilians. They were detained in Bijeljina, where they were allegedly beaten and forced to sign confessions extracted under torture. They were transferred to Serbia before being released. Subsequently, the Vučković brothers were arrested by the Serbian Interior Ministry on 5 November 1993 and indicted on 28 April 1994. Duško was charged with killing sixteen civilians and wounding another twenty in June 1992, reportedly cutting off a civilian's ear, and for raping and robbing a Bosniak woman in the village of Radalj, near Mali Zvornik in Serbia (allowing the case to be tried in Serbia). Vojin Vučković was charged with illegal possession of arms and falsely identifying himself as a police officer. The indictment stated that the brothers had volunteered to help the Serbs in Bosnia and Herzegovina after the war erupted.

During the trial Vojin Vučković denied involvement in the crimes to which he had confessed, claiming that he had been forced to sign a confession because he feared that the secret police would kill his family. He claimed to have been dismissed from the army after about two months, diagnosed as "a psychopath and an alcoholic," and been treated for alcoholism and drug abuse. Vučković boasted about connections in the Serbian Interior Ministry, was proud of his unit's military achievements in and around Zvornik, and said that his brother, who had obeyed his orders in the field, was an example to other soldiers.

According to a Human Rights Watch and Helsinki Watch researcher, the prosecutor's questions were formulated to elicit answers that supported the defense. The prosecution's witnesses, two members of the Yellow Wasps, revealed nothing about the crimes but praised Vojin and Dušan's soldiery. Implied Serbian government involvement in the crimes was not pursued. The prosecution failed to present evidence of wrongdoing, witnesses did not appear, a judge allegedly showed inappropriate support towards the Vučković brothers, guards offered the brothers cigarettes, and on the third day of the trial, defense lawyers announced that Vučković had already been tried and found not guilty by a military court in Banja Luka for war crimes allegedly perpetrated in Bijeljina. The court was dismissed, the presiding judge fell ill, and the trial was then postponed indefinitely.

In July 1996 the Vučković brothers were tried again and Duško Vučković was sentenced to seven years in prison. After an appeal, two years later the Supreme Court of Serbia sentenced Duško Vučković to ten years in prison for a war crime against civilian population and a rape, and Vojin Vučković to four months in prison for illegal possession of firearms, ammunition and explosives.

At trial Duško Vučković admitted he had been a member of the Serb Radical Party (SRS). He said that he joined the SRS because no one else would have taken him because of his mental health problems. He had made plans to go to the frontline with SRS colleagues Zoran Dražilović, Ljubiša Petković and Zoran Rankić and received military training under supervision of Rankic and his brother. He had been arrested on 15 April 1992 after an incident in Zvornik but was released a few days later thanks to the efforts of the president of the SRS in Loznica and a lawyer hired by the party.

In November 2005 Branko Grujić and Branko Popović, and four of the "Yellow Wasps", Dragan Slavković, Ivan Korać, Siniša Filipović and Dragutin Dragićević, were accused of murdering at least 22 and forcefully deporting 1,822 Bosniak civilians from the Zvornik municipality were charged by the War Crimes Chamber of the Belgrade District Court with murder, torture and forcible movement of Zvornik Bosniaks in the period between May and June 1992. The so-called "Zvornik Group" were specifically accused of having expelled more than 1,200 Bosniaks from the villages of Kozluk and Skočić on 26 June 1992. Grujić, Popović and the other four pleaded not guilty. Duško Vučković, who would otherwise have been charged with the same crimes had died suddenly the week before in a detention cell in Belgrade District Prison. The trial was the first war crime trial transferred to the Serbian War Crimes Chamber by the International Criminal Tribunal for the former Yugoslavia.

At the trial in 2008 former Yellow Wasp member Miroslav Nikolić testified that the unit under Vojin Vučković's command had been responsible for the village of Kozluk. After a period away from the unit Nikolić returned to find Kozluk deserted. Grujić and Popović were also accused of knowing about but doing nothing to prevent Yellow Wasp members killing at least 19 Bosniaks from Divič inside the Dom Kultura in Čelopek and at least three others in the Ekonomija and Ciglana districts.

== In film ==
The unit was the subject of a 1995 film by Ilan Ziv.

== See also ==
- Serbian paramilitary
- Zvornik massacre
