= Filip Kljajić =

Filip Kljajić may refer to:

- Filip Kljajić (Yugoslav Partisan), a Yugoslav Partisan fighter during World War II and political commissar of the 1st Proletarian Brigade
- Filip Kljajić (footballer), Serbian association football goalkeeper who plays for FK Partizan
