= Zvornik Fortress =

Fortress in Bosnia and Herzegovina

Zvornik Castle
- Zvornik, Bosnia and Herzegovina
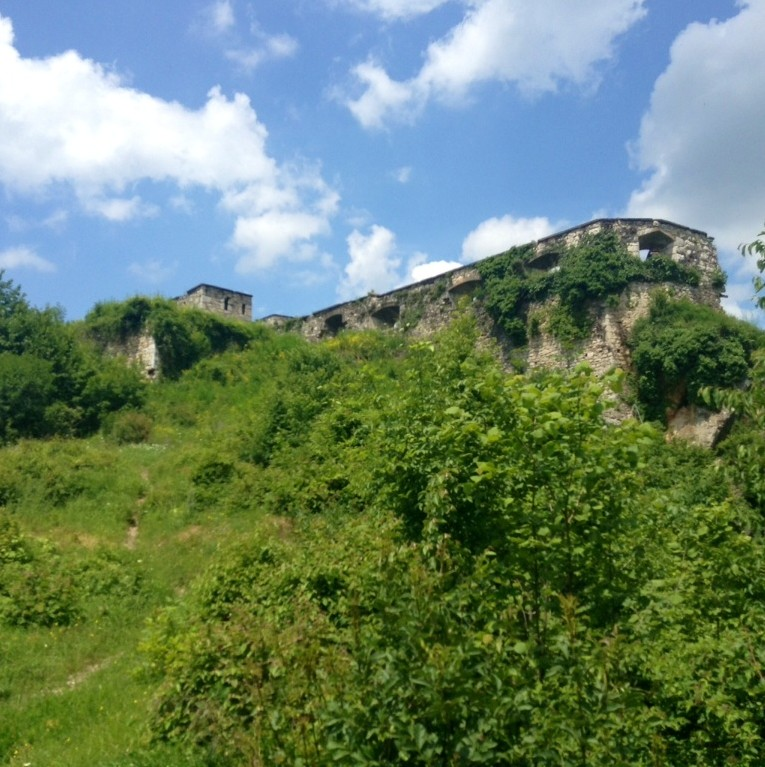

Location
- Coordinates: 44.3697°N 19.0903°E

Site history
- Built: c. 12th century

Zvornik Castle (Bosnian, Croatian and Serbian: Zvornička tvrđava / Зворничка тврђава), also known as the Old Town of Zvornik (Stari grad Zvornik / Стари град Зворник) and Kula Grad (Кула Град, English: Tower City), is a medieval castle located in Zvornik, Bosnia and Herzegovina, on the mountain Mlađevac overlooking Drina Valley. Zvornik fortress is 147 metres (482 ft) above sea level.

== History ==
The medieval town of Zvornik called "Đurđevgrad" or "Kula Grad" was first mentioned as a property of Bosnian medieval feudal family Zlatonosović in 1410 when Hungarian King Sigismund was in the area. It was probably built in the 12th or 13th century and is one of the largest medieval fortresses in Bosnia and Herzegovina.

=== Austria-Hungary ===
Part of the structure was destroyed in 1878 during the Austro-Hungarian invasion of Bosnia and Herzegovina.

=== World War II ===
Ustasha troops of the fascist Independent State of Croatia occupied the fortress along with the rest of Zvornik and most of Bosnia, in April 1941. The fortress was liberated in July 1943 by the 1st Proletarian Brigade during the Battle of Zvornik.

=== Bosnian War ===
Beginning on 8 April 1992, about 300 soldiers of the Army of the Republic of Bosnia and Herzegovina defended the fortress from Serb soldiers of the Yugoslav People's Army during the first stages of the Bosnian War. Following the Bosnian War, Zvornik became a part of Republika Srpska and the new Serb government had a church built on the grounds of the fortress and relocated a church bell from the village of Divič to the new church to mark their victory over Bosniaks.

In May 2013, the remains of several war victims from the 1990s conflict were uncovered in Kula grad.

== Gallery ==
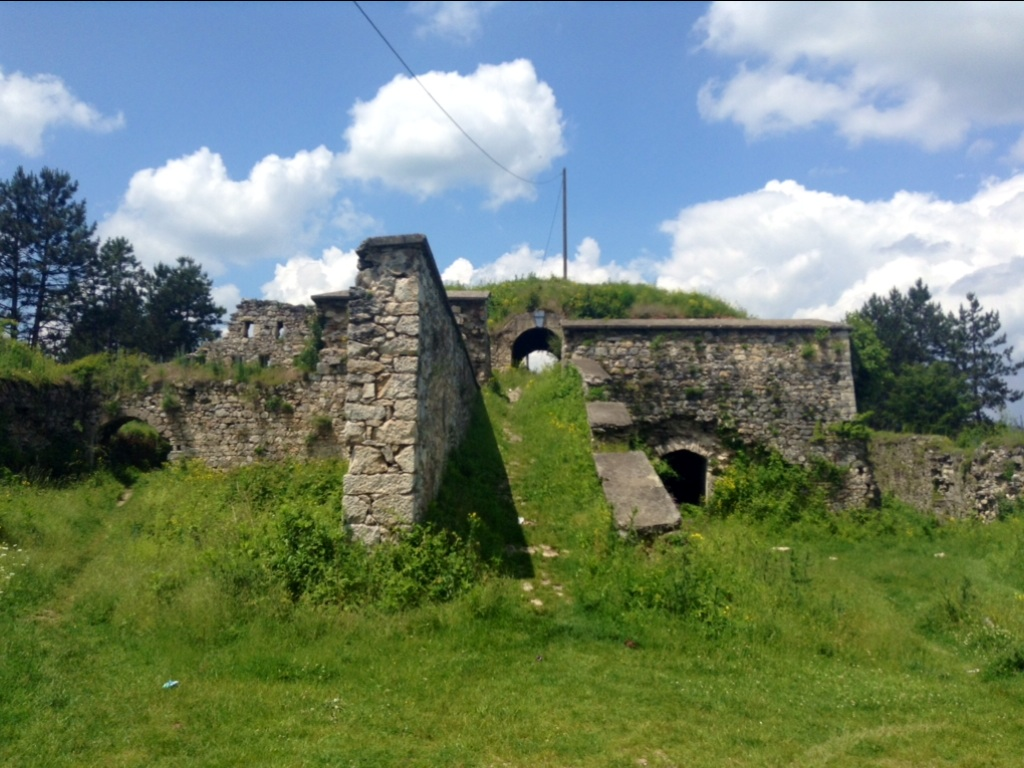

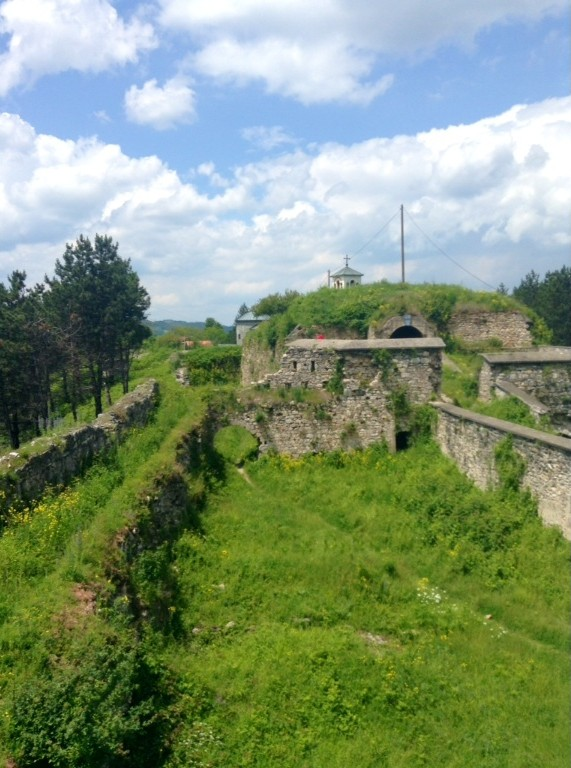

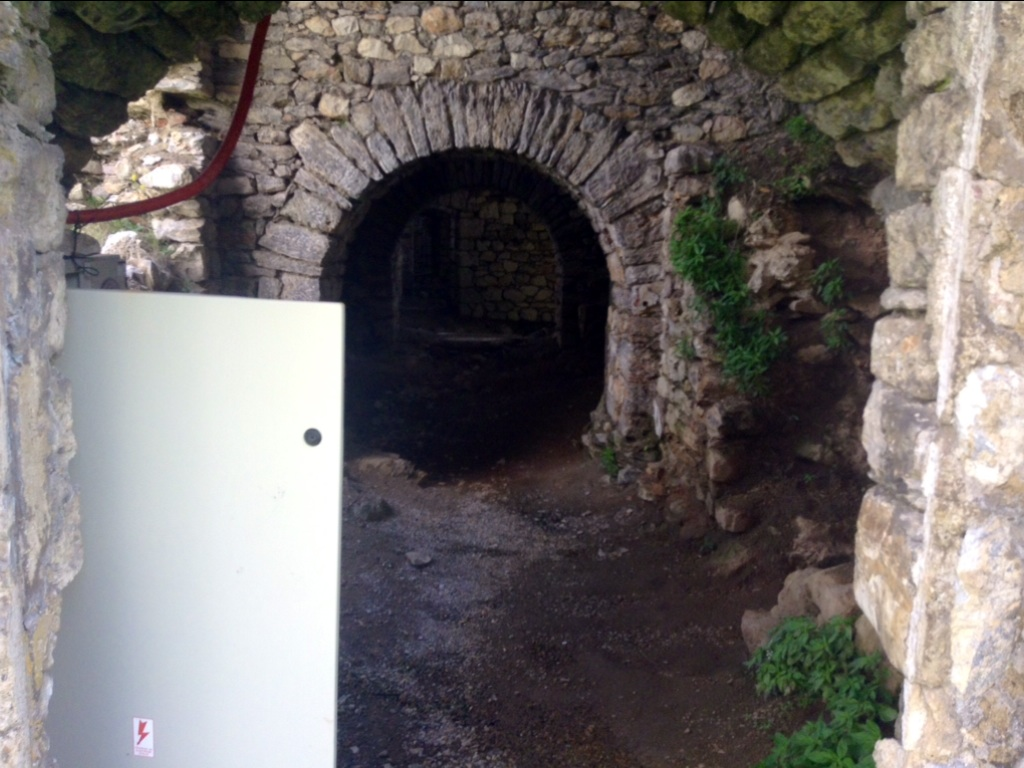
Interior of the main structure

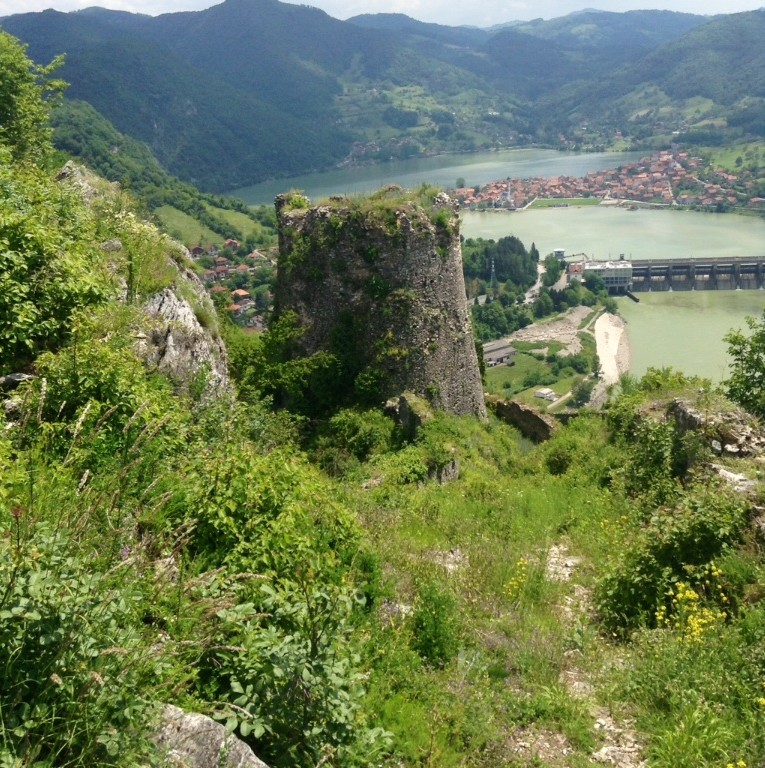

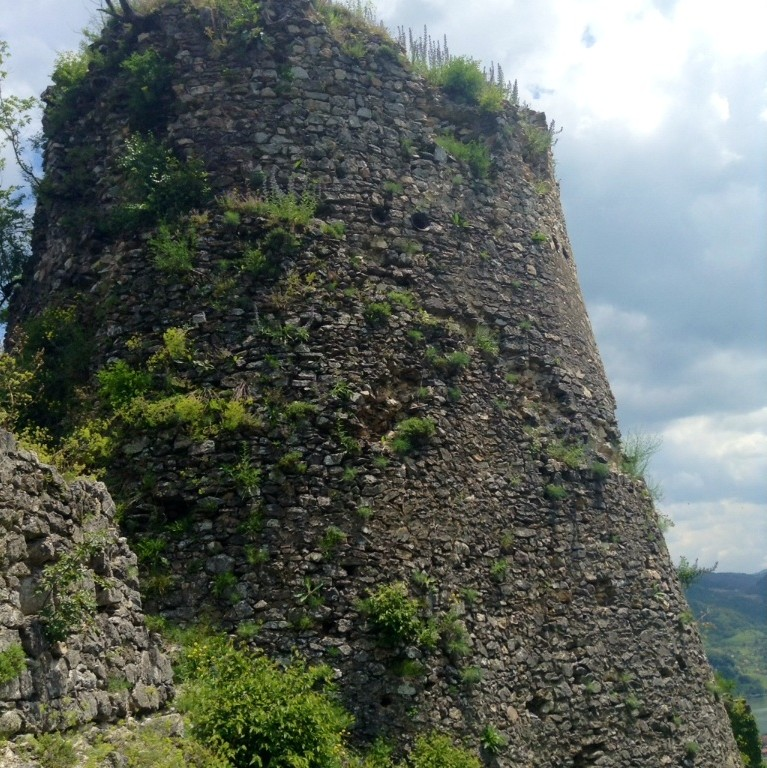
Two cannons visible on side

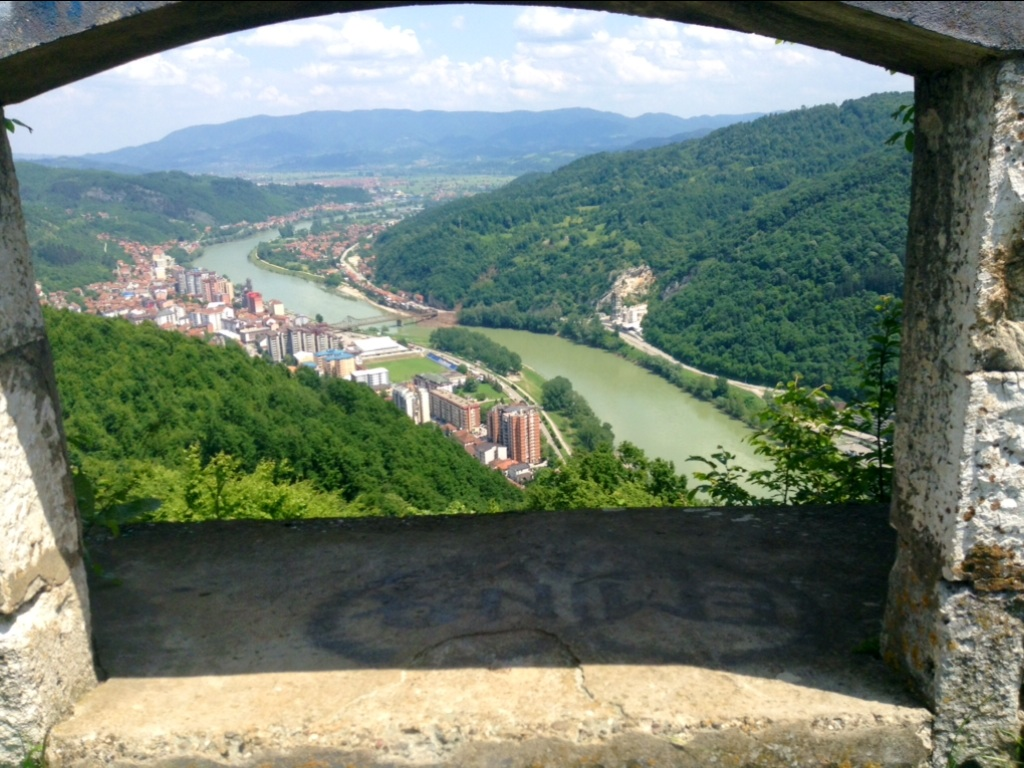
View of Drina Valley from the castle

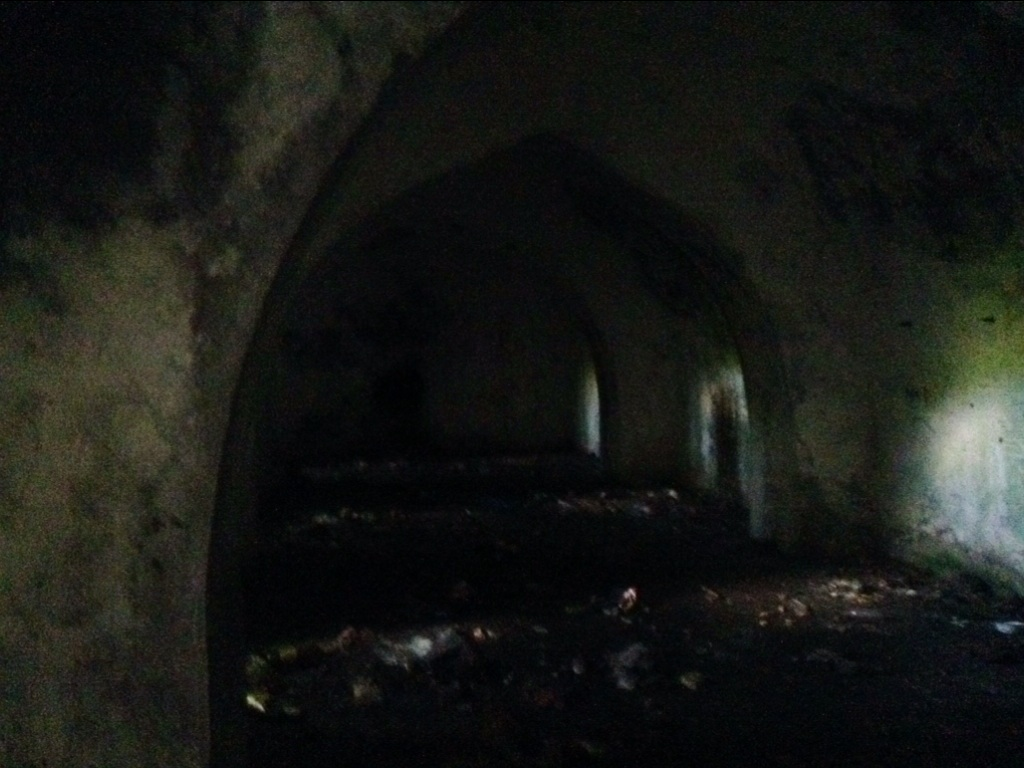
The dungeon

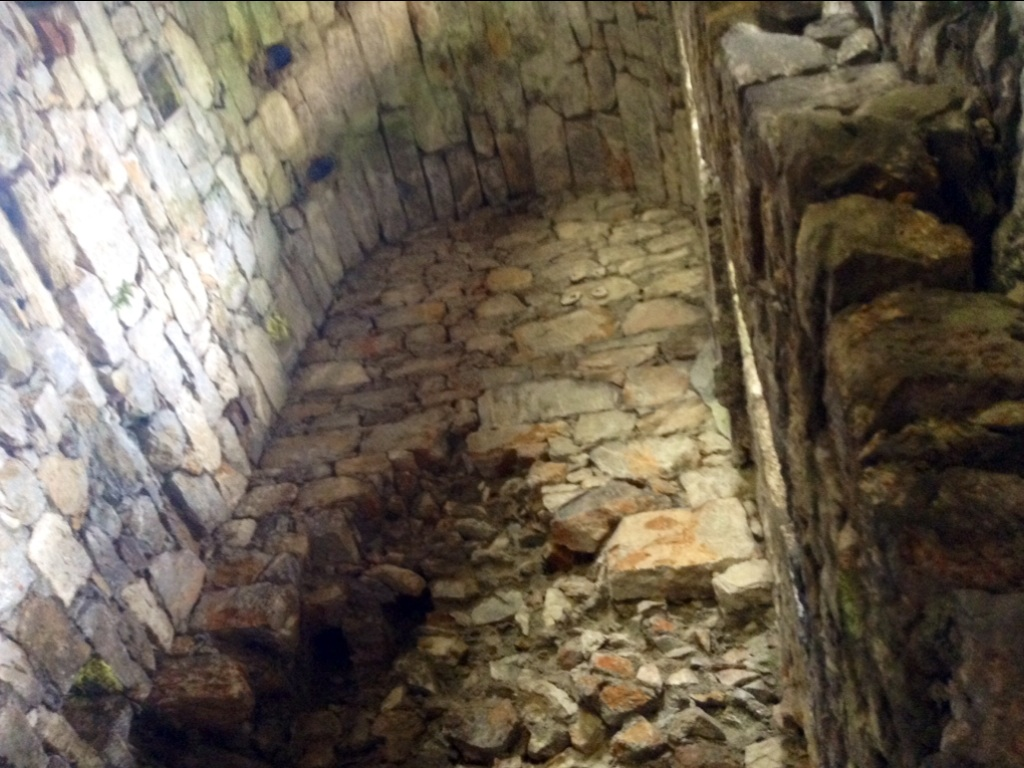
Ceiling of a room in the main structure

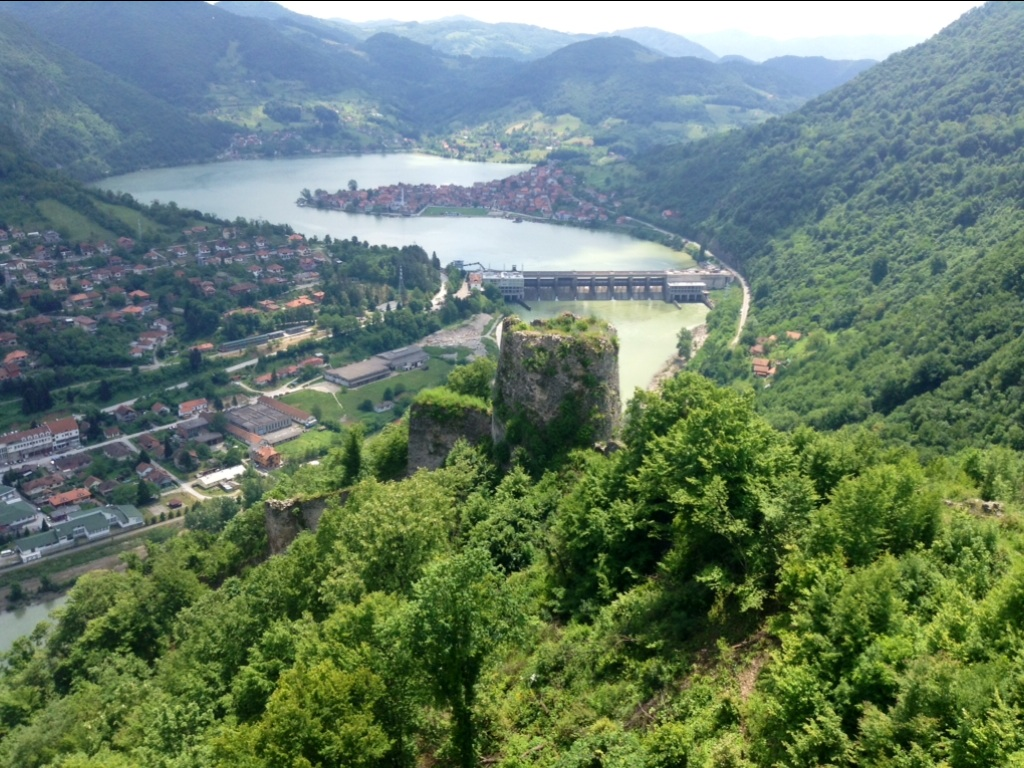

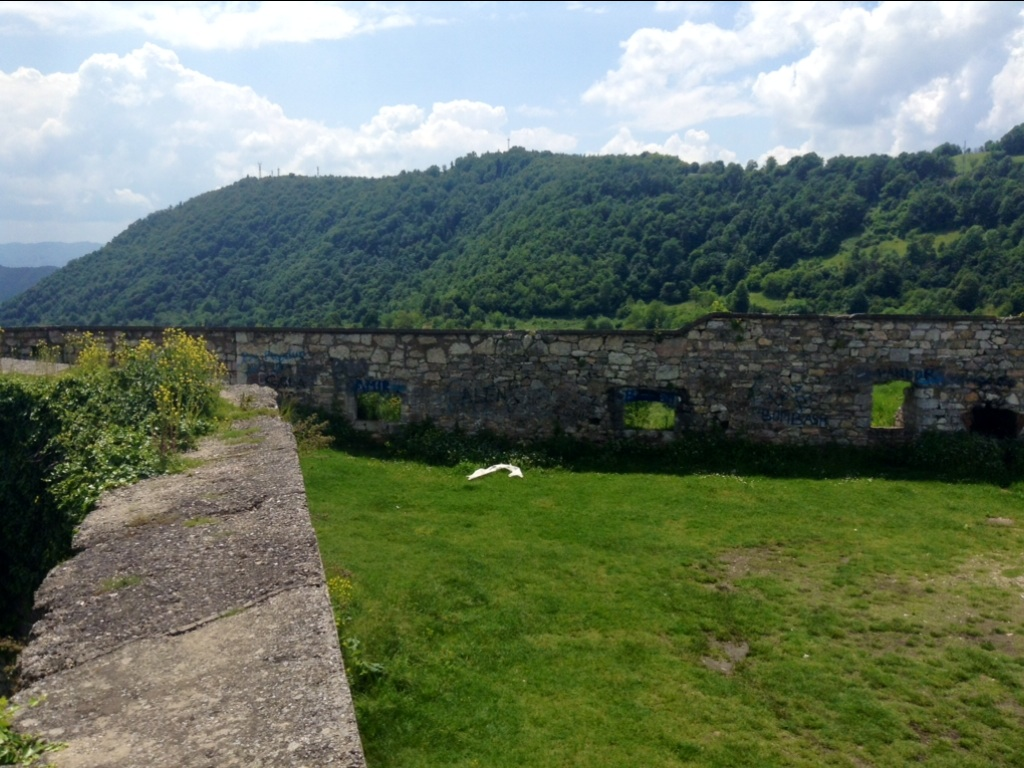
Courtyard

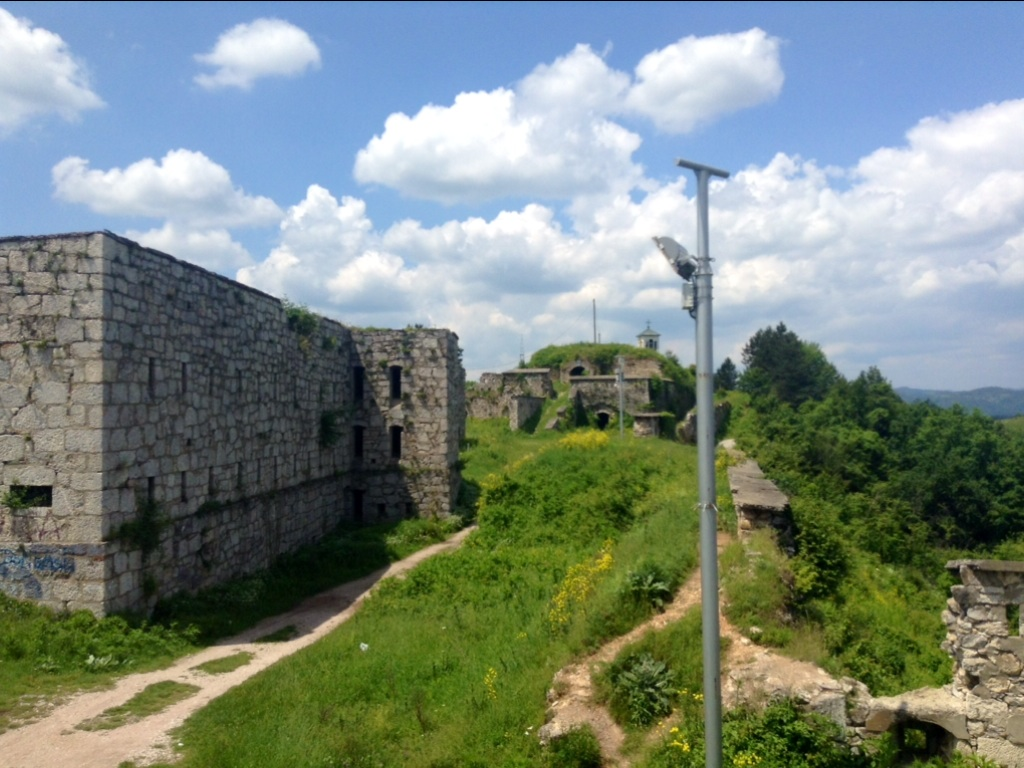
Courtyard with security cameras visible

== See also ==
- List of fortifications in Bosnia and Herzegovina
