= Alan Ibrahimagić =

Bosnian basketball coach

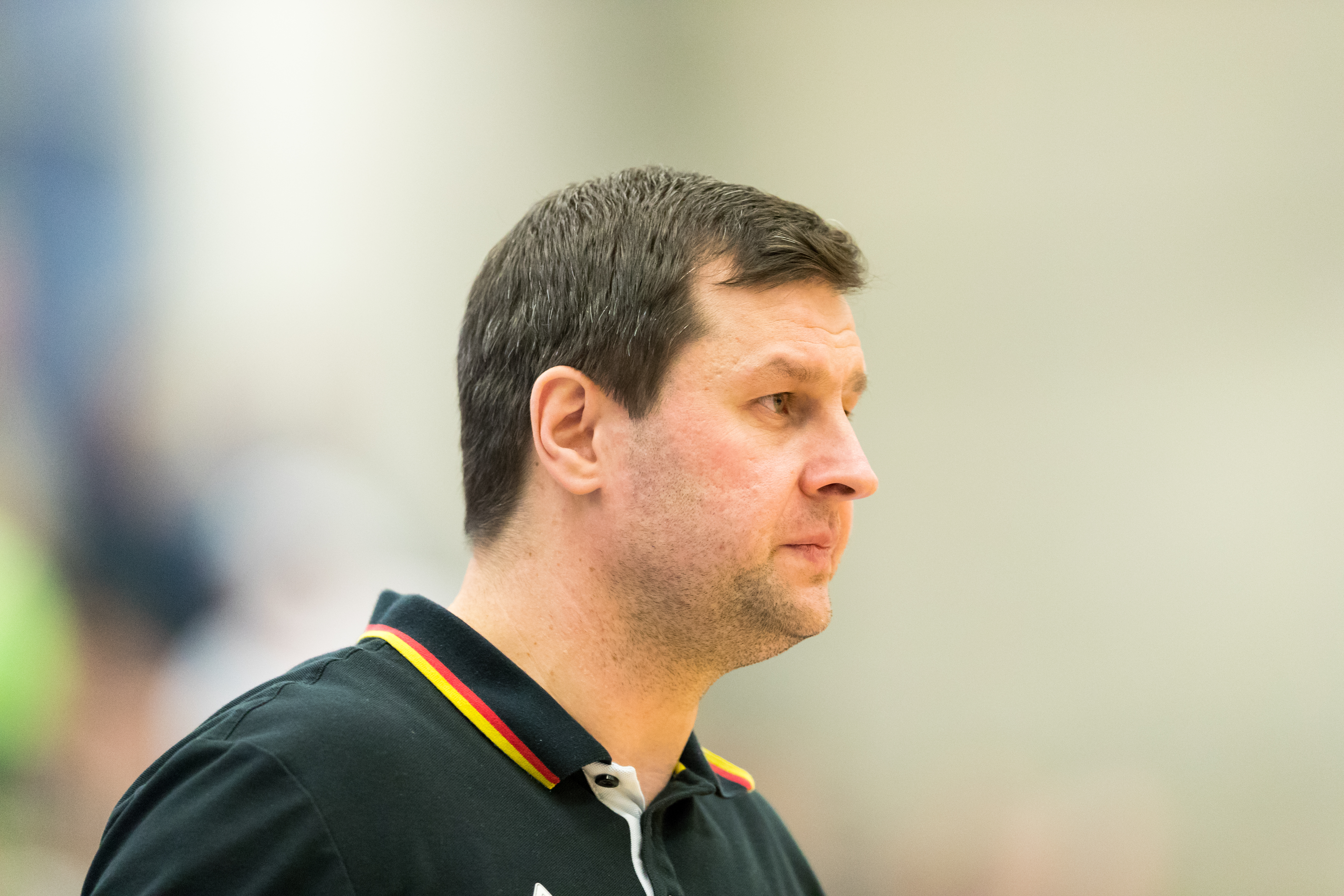
- Ibrahimagić in 2018

Personal information
- Born: 5 March 1978 (age 48) Belgrade, SR Serbia, SFR Yugoslavia
- Listed height: 1.94 m (6 ft 4 in)

Career information
- Playing career: 1996–2003
- Coaching career: 2003–present

Career history

Playing
- 1996–1998: TuS Lichterfelde
- 2001–2003: VfB Hermsdorf

Coaching
- 2011–2012: Alba Berlin (assistant)
- 2012–2013: Riesen Ludwigsburg (assistant)
- 2017–2019: Germany U20
- 2023–2024: Germany U18
- 2025: Germany U19
- 2025: Germany (acting head coach)
Medals
Men's basketball
Acting head coach for Germany
EuroBasket
| Gold medal – first place | 2025 Cyprus–Finland–Poland–Latvia |
Assistant coach for Germany
FIBA World Cup
| Gold medal – first place | 2023 Philippines–Japan–Indonesia |
EuroBasket
| Bronze medal – third place | 2022 Czech Republic–Georgia–Italy–Germany |
Head coach for Germany
FIBA U19 World Cup
| Silver medal – second place | 2025 Switzerland |
FIBA U20 European Championship
| Bronze medal – third place | 2019 Israel |
FIBA U18 European Championship
| Gold medal – first place | 2024 Finland |

Alan Ibrahimagić (born 5 March 1978) is an Australian-Bosnian basketball coach. He is best known for leading the Germany national team as acting head coach to the gold medal at the EuroBasket 2025.

== Early life and playing career ==
Ibrahimagić was born in Belgrade where his mother was attending medical university, in 1978. Three days later, he moved with his family to Zvornik, where he spent his childhood. He lived in what is now Bosnia until he was 14 years old when he moved to Berlin, Germany in 1992, due to the outbreak of the Bosnian War and subsequent expulsion and mass killings of Bosniaks from Zvornik.

In youth categories, from 1996 to 1998 he played basketball with VfB Hermsdorf and later TuS Lichterfelde. In 1998, he relocated to Australia, where he had some family members, as he could no longer remain in Germany. He earned Australian citizenship and finished his education, and went back to Germany in 2001. He went on to play until 2003 for VfB Hermsdorf.

== Coaching career ==
Ibrahimagić began coaching from 2003 in the German youth system. He achieved early success with IBBA Berlin (coaching the U16 team to 3rd place in the German Championship in 2005, then to the U16 title in 2006) and with ALBA Berlin's youth program (his U16 team finished runner-up in the national league in 2010). He moved into senior coaching around 2010, he was head coach of ALBA Berlin II in 2010–11 and then served as assistant coach under Gordon Herbert on ALBA Berlin's top Bundesliga squad in 2011. The following season (2012–13) he was an assistant with the Riesen Ludwigsburg in Germany's top league.

Within the German Basketball Federation, he worked extensively with youth national teams. He has worked for the German Basketball Federation (DBB) since 2007, initially as a youth coach, and became a full-time member of its coaching staff in 2013. Over the years he has led several German youth national teams at European and World Championships, establishing himself as a central figure in the federation's development program. He is seen as a key architect of the German youth pipeline.

He coached the German U20 team between 2017 and 2019, guiding them to strong finishes at the European Championships. He later led the German U18 squad to the gold medal at the FIBA U18 European Championship in 2024. In 2025 he led the German U19 squad to a silver medal at the FIBA U19 World Cup.

During the EuroBasket 2025, head coach Álex Mumbrú was forced to step down temporarily due to health problems. Ibrahimagić assumed the role of acting head coach. Under his leadership, Germany went undefeated in the group stage, later defeating Turkey 88–83 in the final to capture the gold medal. Longtime national captain Dennis Schröder publicly praised Ibrahimagić's efforts in leading the team.

== Coaching style ==
Ibrahimagić has been described by German media as a calm and analytical coach, with a strong emphasis on teamwork and player development, particularly in transitioning youth players into senior competition.
