= Denis Omerbegović =

Bosnia and Herzegovina footballer (born 1986)

Personal information
- Date of birth: 11 March 1986 (age 40)
- Place of birth: Zvornik, SR Bosnia and Herzegovina, SFR Yugoslavia
- Height: 1.80 m (5 ft 11 in)
- Position: Winger

Youth career
- 1993–1996: Schwarz-Weiss Frankfurt
- 1996–2003: LR Ahlen

Senior career*
Years	Team	Apps	(Gls)
2003–2007	LR Ahlen II	23	(0)
2003–2007	LR Ahlen	25	(0)
2007–2009	Borussia Dortmund II	59	(12)
2009–2010	SV Elversberg	47	(10)
2011	Karlsruher SC	2	(0)
2011–2012	Ceahlăul Piatra Neamţ	7	(0)
2012	CSCA–Rapid Chişinău	11	(2)
Total		174	(24)
- * Club domestic league appearances and goals

Denis Omerbegović (born 11 March 1986) is a Bosnian-Herzegovinian former professional footballer who played as a winger.

== Career ==
Omerbegović was born in Zvornik. Before coming to Dortmund, he played on the second level of professional German football, 2. Bundesliga for LR Ahlen. After three years in Dortmund, he left and joined fourth division side SV Elversberg. In January 2011, he returned to the 2. Bundesliga.

On 8 June 2011, he signed for Romanian club Ceahlăul.

== Personal life ==
Omerbegović also holds German citizenship.
