= Zelinje =

Coordinates: 44°16′45″N 19°11′44″E

- Village
- Interactive map of Zelinje
- Country: Bosnia and Herzegovina
- Entity: Republika Srpska
- Municipality: Zvornik
- Time zone: UTC+1 (CET)
  - Summer (DST): UTC+2 (CEST)

Zelinje (Serbian Cyrillic: Зелиње) is a village in the municipality of Zvornik, Bosnia and Herzegovina.

== Demographics ==
At the 2013 census, Zelinje had 424 inhabitants, made up of:

| Ethnicity | 2013 |
| Serbs | 422 (99.53%) |
| Croats | 2 (0.47%) |
| Total | 424 |
