= Nada Obrić =

Bosnian Serb folk singer (born 1948)

- Born: 6 June 1948 (age 77); Zvornik, Bosnia and Herzegovina, Yugoslavia
- Genres: Folk
- Occupation: Singer

Nada Obrić (born 6 June 1948 in Zvornik, Bosnia and Herzegovina, Yugoslavia) is a Bosnian Serb folk singer.

== Early life and career ==
Born in Zvornik, she was an excellent gymnast and in competitions won as the best gymnast in the state of Bosnia in Yugoslavia. Afterwards, she went to university in Sarajevo, and finished a degree in law. As she was studying, she was offered a label by Jugoton and began to produce singles with the record company. She then worked in the council within Sarajevo, whilst maintaining a part-time singing career.

After 17 years of working in the council, she quit her job and became a singer full-time. Over her singing career, she released many Yugoslav hits including 'Dugo te dugo očekujem', '700 dana bolujem', 'Čuvaj me', 'Bolna ti ležim', 'Žašto se nismo ranije sreli', and 'Gdje si'.

== Discography ==
Singles

- Neću da plačem (1971)
- Neću ljubav drugu (1972)
- Pjesmom te zovem (1973)
- Ne idi drugoj ženi (1974)
- Ko je kriv za moju tugu / Noćas hoću da sam tvoja (1975)
- Ljubavi zovem te (1975)
- Ja te čekam danima (1977)
- Gde se dvoje vole suvišan je treći (1977)
- Noćas za tebe pjevam (1978)
- Duša me boli, još tebe volim (1979)
- Uzalud se tebi nadam (1979)
- Kolo igra kod komšije (1980)
- Pusti me na miru da svoj život živim / Ljubav (1980)
- Ne dozvoli da te druga voli (1981)
- Bolna ti ležim (1986)
- 700 dana bolujem (1988)
- Joj kako cu sama (1989)

Studio Albums

- Neću drugu ljubav (1972)
- Pjesmom te zovem (1977)
- Pjevaj, Nado, veselo (1979)
- Kolo igra kod komšije (1980)
- Ne dozvoli da te druga voli (1981)
- Pogledaj me ti u oči (1982)
- Čuvaj me (1983)
- Nije lako bez tebe (1984)
- Suze ljubavi (1986)
- Sad mi trebaš (1988)
- Kako ću sama (1989)
- Oprosti mi suzu (1991)
- Ozdravilo srce moje (1994)
- Došlo vreme (1997)
- Tako je život hteo (2001)

Compilations

- Najljepše pjesme (1987)
- Folk zvijezde zauvijek (2008)
- Najveći hitovi (2009)
