= Filip Kljajić (Yugoslav Partisan) =

Yugoslav Partisan fighter

Filip Kljaić
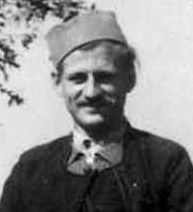
- Kljaić in 1941
- Born: Filip Kljaić; 2 May 1913; Tremušnjak, Croatia-Slavonia, Austria-Hungary
- Died: 5 July 1943 (aged 30); Zvornik, Independent State of Croatia
- Spouse: Đurđelina Dinić
- Awards: Order of the People's Hero (25 September 1944)

Filip "Fića" Kljaić (Serbian Cyrillic: Филип Фића Кљаић; 2 May 1913 – 5 July 1943) was a Yugoslav Partisan fighter during World War II and political commissar of the 1st Proletarian Brigade. Kljaić was killed during the Battle of Zvornik and posthumously awarded the Order of the People's Hero on 25 September 1944.

== Biography ==
Kljaić was born in the village of Tremušnjak, in the Kingdom of Croatia-Slavonia of the Austro-Hungarian Empire, near the town of Petrinja, to a Croatian Serb family. Prior to the outbreak of the war, Kljajić was a shoemaker.

== World War 2 ==
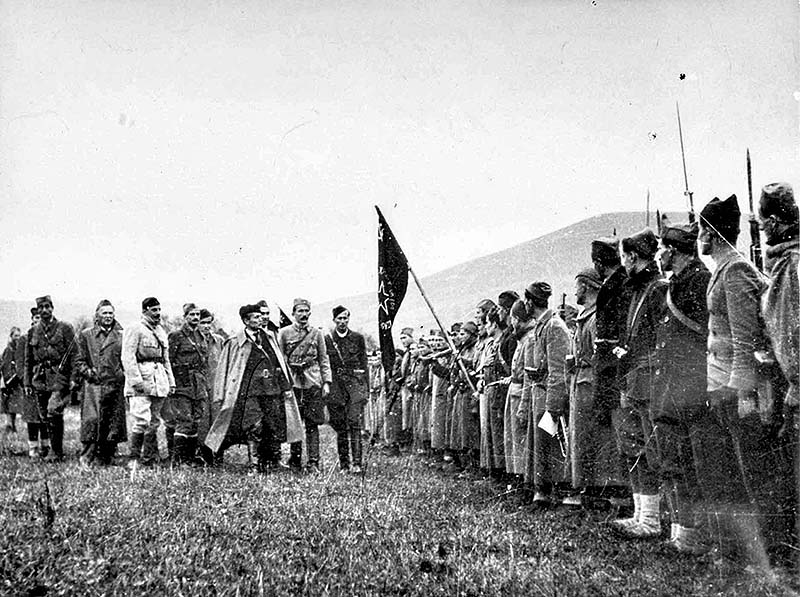
Josip Broz Tito inspects 1st Proletarian Brigade. Next to him are: Ivan Ribar, Koča Popović, Filip Kljajić, Ivo Lola Ribar, Danilo Lekić and Mijalko Todorović.

In early July 1943, the 1st Proletarian Brigade, with Kljajić serving as their political commissar (since 21 December 1941), attempted to liberate the occupied Bosnian town Zvornik from the Wehrmacht and the troops of the Axis puppet state, the Independent State of Croatia. During the withdrawal Kljajić died of an accidental gunshot wound, on a hill on the outskirts of Zvornik. His body was taken to the Bosniak village of Liplje, on a mountain near Zvornik and buried. Kljajić's body was later taken from that spot by his family and reburied in a family plot elsewhere. A memorial was erected on the spot where his body was originally buried. Following the ethnic cleansing of Liplje in 1992 at the start of the Bosnian War, the memorial suffered and became overgrown with shrubbery.

Kljajić's family suffered several losses during World War II. His wife Đurđelina Dinić (born 9 November 1914) was killed 25 May 1943. Filip's brother-in-law and nephew were killed in 1941. On 22 January 1943, Filip's niece Milanka (born 1924), also a Partisan, was killed.
