= Divič =

Coordinates: 44.3656°N 19.1128°E

Divič Дивич
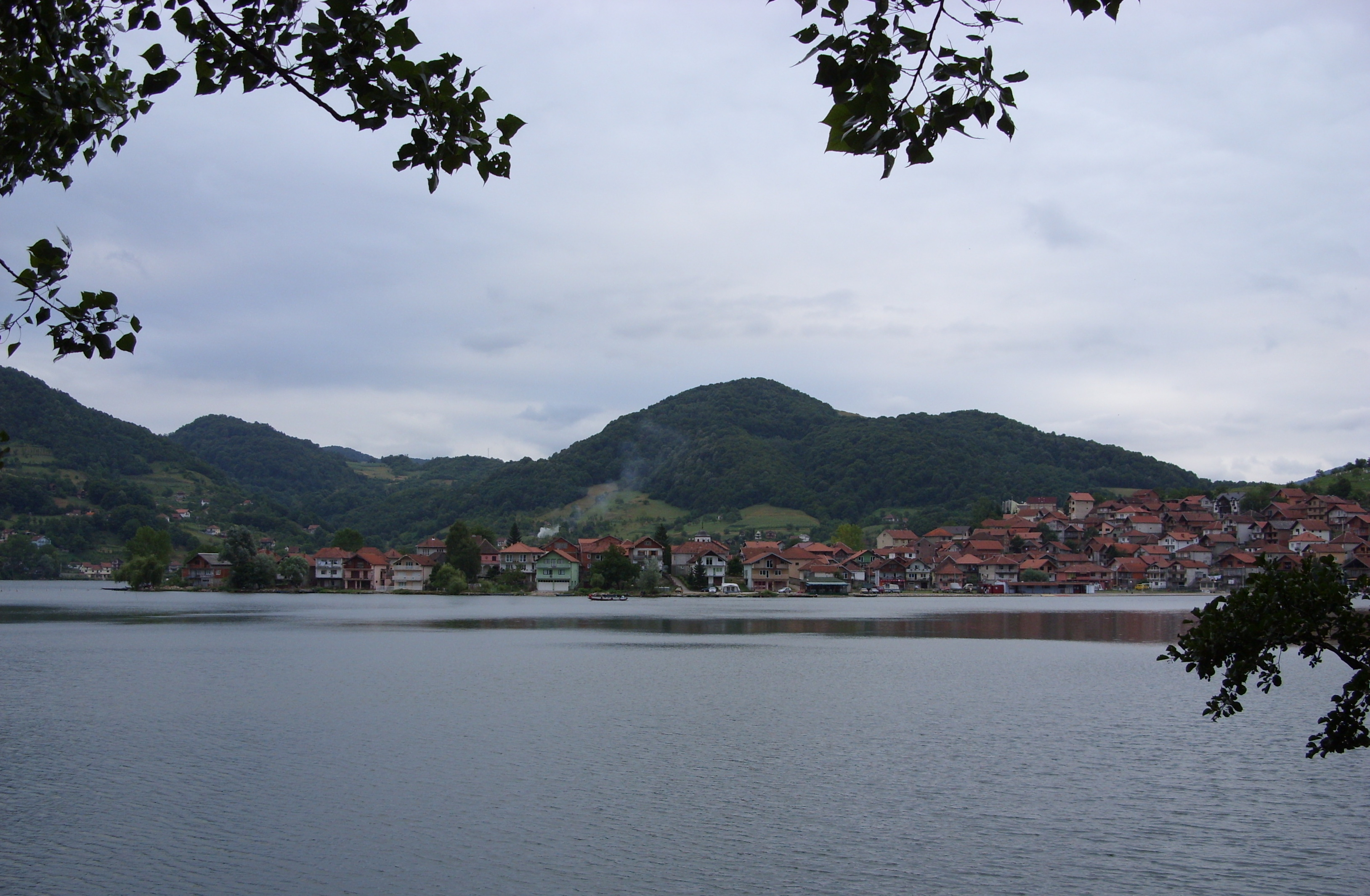
- Interactive map of Divič
- Country: Bosnia
- Entity: Republika Srpska
- Municipality: Zvornik

Population (2013)
  - Total: 853
- Time zone: UTC+1 (CET)
  - Summer (DST): UTC+2 (CEST)

Divič (Serbian Cyrillic: Дивич) is a village by the city of Zvornik, Bosnia and Herzegovina. It is located on the Drina River, by an artificial lake created to form a reservoir for the HPP Zvornik hydro-electric power plant. The Drina River and the lake are a natural and administrative border between Bosnia and Herzegovina and Serbia and during the international armed conflict of 1992–95 the village was "ethnically cleansed" of its Bosniak inhabitants by Serb forces.

== Demographics ==
The 1991 census showed Divič had a total population of 1,388.

- 1,360 - Bosniaks
- 13 - others
- 7 - Yugoslavs
- 4 - Croats
- 4 - Serbs

The 2013 census showed Divič had a total population of 853.

- 850 - Bosniaks
- 3 - others
- 0 - Yugoslavs
- 0 - Croats
- 0 - Serbs

== History ==
In 1910 Divič had 133 houses and 479 inhabitants, all of Islamic religion.

The village is strategically located on the Drina River, which marks the line of the border between Bosnia & Herzegovina and Serbia. In 1992, in the early days of the Bosnian War, the village was "ethnically cleansed" of all its predominantly Bosniak residents and many were killed. Many of the men who died were killed in incidents in the Dom Kultura prison camp in Čelopek, where appalling atrocities were perpetrated by members of the Yellow Wasps paramilitary group led by the Vučković brothers.

Under the Dayton peace settlement which brought the war to an end, the village became part of the Republika Srpska entity of Bosnia & Herzegovina. Bosnian Serbs changed the name of Divič to Sveti Stefan. Survivors began to return to their homes and the village was renamed Divič once again by The Republika Srpska entity of Bosnia & Herzegovina. Today the village has some 350-400 residents.

== Sport ==
=== Football match in support of refugee return ===
On 2 June 2009, six members of Bosnia's national soccer team played in a symbolic match organised in Divič between the two clubs Drina 93 and Mladost Divič, with the aim of encouraging refugee return. Thousands of Bosniak (Bosnian Muslim) returnees came to watch the match.

One of the players, Samir Muratović, was born in the nearby village of Snagovo, where forensic investigators have recovered hundreds of bodies from mass graves since the war ended. Among the visiting stars were striker Edin Džeko, Sejad Salihović, Miralem Pjanić, Said Husejinović and Elvir Rahimić.
