= Gornji Lokanj =

- Village
- Location within Bosnia and Herzegovina
- Coordinates: 44.576404°N 19.0428174°E
- Country: Bosnia and Herzegovina
- Entity: Republika Srpska; Federation of Bosnia and Herzegovina
- Region Canton: Bijeljina; Tuzla
- Municipality: Zvornik; Sapna

Area
  - Total: 5.79 sq mi (15.00 km^{2})

Population (2013)
  - Total: 683
  - Density: 118/sq mi (45.5/km^{2})

Gornji Lokanj is a village in the municipalities of Zvornik (Republika Srpska) and Sapna, Bosnia and Herzegovina.

== Demographics ==
According to the 2013 census, its population was 683, all of them living in the Zvornik part thus none in the Sapna part.

Ethnicity in 2013
Ethnicity	Number	Percentage
Serbs	681	99.7%
Croats	1	0.1%
other/undeclared	1	0.1%
Total	683	100%
