= Battle of Zvornik =

1943 battle in Bosnian town

- Part of World War II in Yugoslavia
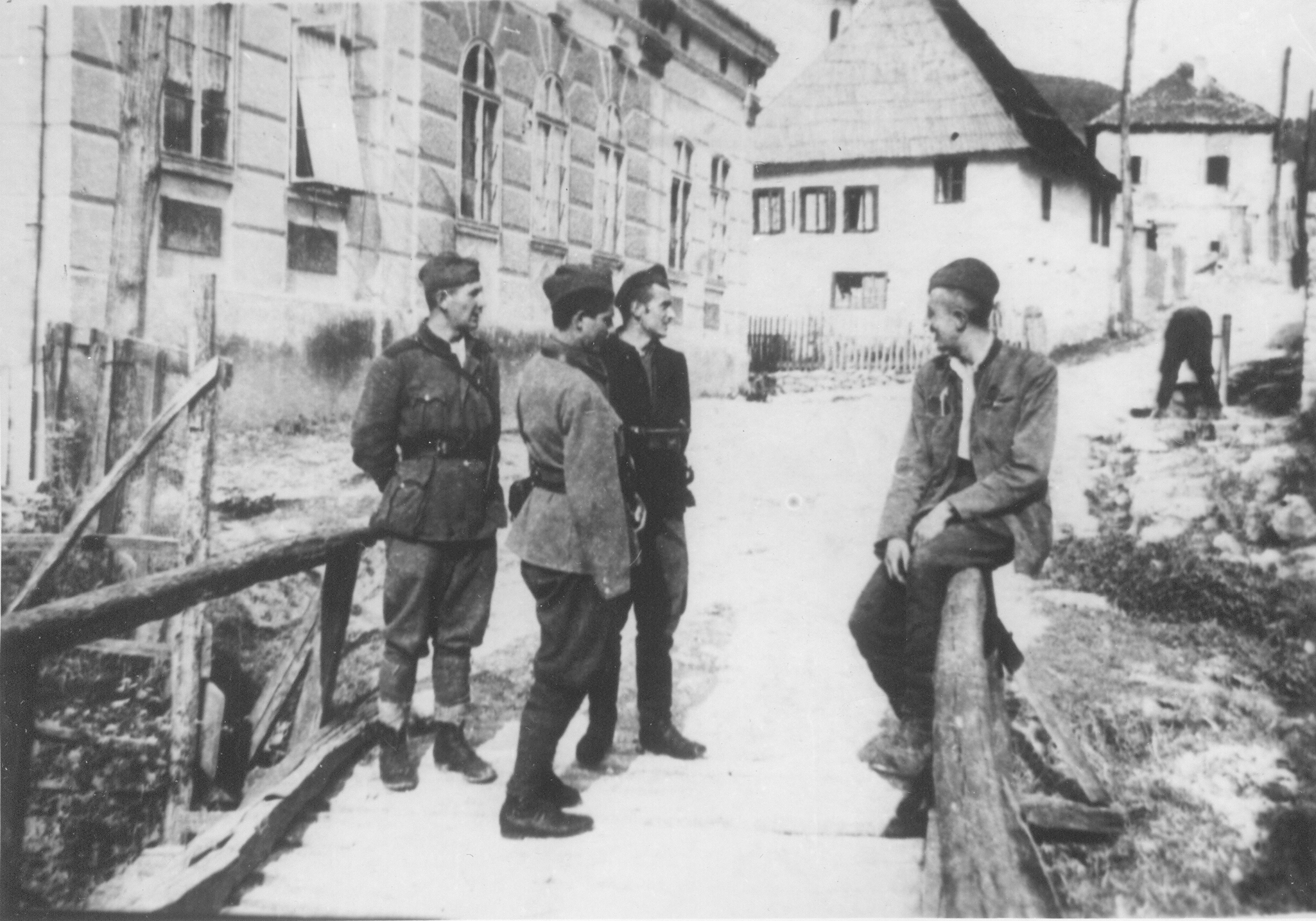
- Zvornik in 1943
Date	4–5 July 1943
Location	Zvornik, Independent State of Croatia (present-day Bosnia and Herzegovina) 44°23′3″N 19°6′9″E
Result	Successful capture of Zvornik by Partisan forces

Belligerents
Yugoslav Partisans	Germany; Independent State of Croatia

Commanders and leaders
Koča Popović (commander); Filip Kljajić † (political commissary)	Rudolf Lüters (general)

Casualties and losses
3,500–5,000	450–2,000

The Battle of Zvornik (Serbo-Croatian: Bitka u Zvorniku) was the 1943 capture by the 1st Proletarian Brigade of the occupied Bosnian town Zvornik from the Wehrmacht and the Ustasha troops of the occupying Independent State of Croatia.

== Operation ==
Preparation for the offensive on the occupied town of Zvornik by the 1st Proletarian Brigade began in June 1943. On the order of the brigades commander Koča Popović, the troops began their attack on the night of 4 July 1943.

The idea of the attack was that during the night the sudden, powerful onslaught could takeover the Zvornik Fortress (Kula grad) on Mount Mlađevac. Mlađevac and Zmajevac were also successfully captured in the initial attack. The Ustasha troops, legionnaires and civilians fled across the Drina river into Serbia. Many people died crossing the Drina.

Filip Kljajić, the political commissary of the 1st Proletarian Brigade, was shot accidentally on a hill on the outskirts of Zvornik during withdrawal. His body was taken to the Bosniak village Liplje on a mountain near Zvornik and buried. Kljajić's body was later taken from that spot by his family and reburied in a family plot elsewhere. A memorial was erected on the spot where his corpse was originally buried. Following the ethnic cleansing of Liplje in 1992 at the start of the Bosnian War, the memorial suffered and became overgrown with shrubbery.

== Aftermath ==
Rodoljub Čolaković, who participated in the capture on the Partisan side, wrote in his 1962 memoir Winning Freedom: "We had reached a grand and most significant victory in eastern Bosnia. We had liberated Zvornik, an important junction of communications along the Drina."
