= Pađine =

Pađine Пађине
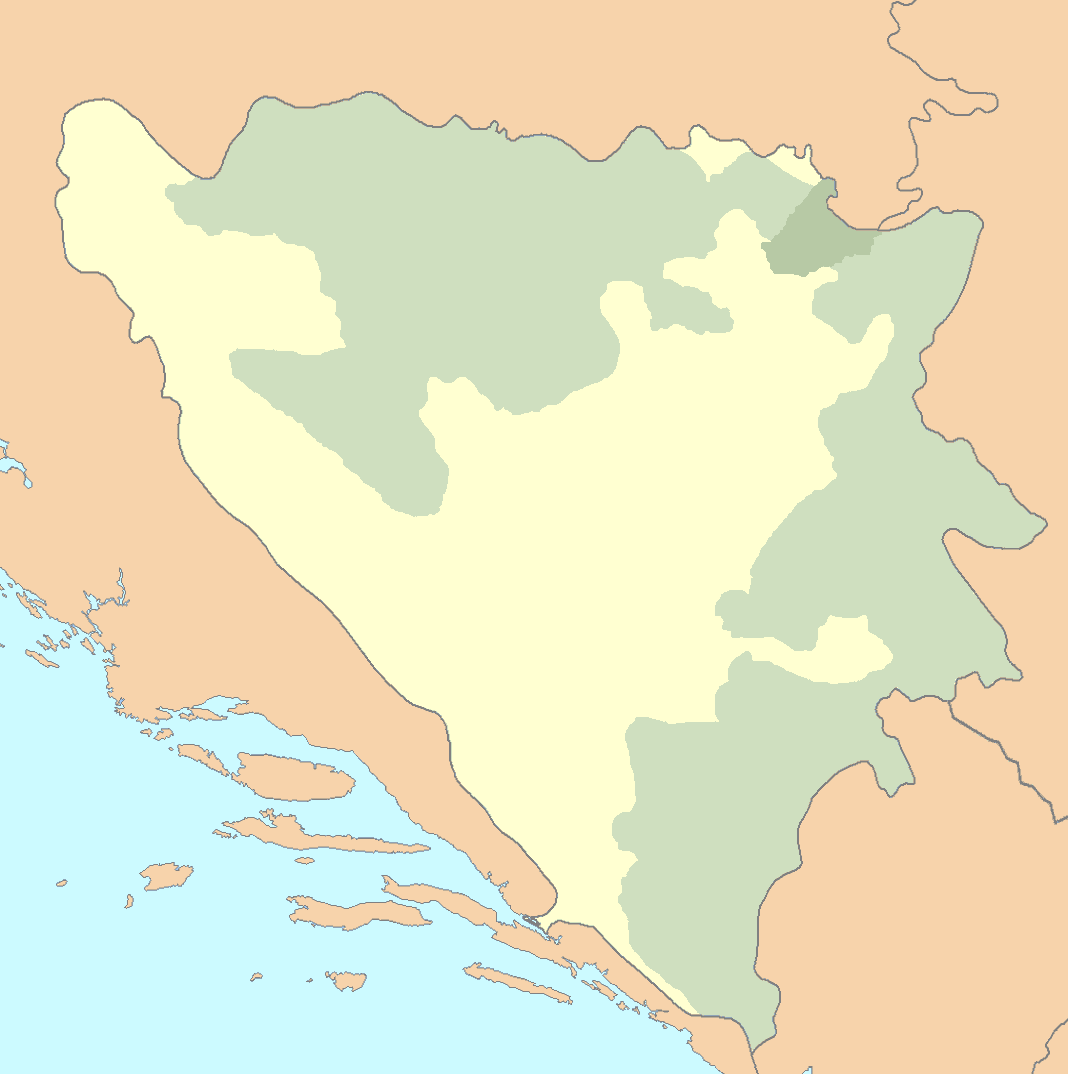
- Coordinates: 44°32′.5″N 19°7′.22″E
- Country: Bosnia and Herzegovina
- City: Zvornik

Population (1991)
  - Total: 560
- Time zone: UTC+1 (CET)
  - Summer (DST): [[UTCCEST]]
- Area code: +387

Pađine (Serbian Cyrillic: Пађине) is a hamlet in the municipality of Zvornik, Bosnia and Herzegovina. There is a museum where one can find various fossils from the Mesozoic era.

== Population ==
According to the census of 1991, the town had 560 inhabitants, of whom 553 were Serbs.

== See also ==
- Zvornik, a municipality
