= Tremušnjak =

- Village
- Location of Tremušnjak in Croatia
- Coordinates: 45°18′11″N 16°18′31″E
- Country: Croatia
- Region: Continental Croatia (Banovina)
- County: Sisak-Moslavina
- Municipality: Petrinja

Area
  - Total: 6.2 km^{2} (2.4 sq mi)

Population (2021)
  - Total: 16
  - Density: 2.6/km^{2} (6.7/sq mi)
- Time zone: UTC+1 (CET)
  - Summer (DST): UTC+2 (CEST)
- Postal code: 44204 Jabukovac
- Area code: (+385) 44

Tremušnjak is a village in central Croatia, in the Town of Petrinja, Sisak-Moslavina County. It is connected by the D30 highway.

== Demographics ==
According to the 2011 census, the village of Tremušnjak had 47 inhabitants. This represents 23.04% of its pre-war population according to the 1991 census.

The 1991 census recorded that 98.53% of the village population were ethnic Serbs (201/204), 0.49% were ethnic Croats (1/204), 0.49% were Yugoslavs (1/204) and 0.49% were of other ethnic origin (1/204).

Historical population 1857-2011
v

population	317	341	366	450	490	546	478	530	368	376	346	289	257	204	44	47
	1857	1869	1880	1890	1900	1910	1921	1931	1948	1953	1961	1971	1981	1991	2001	2011

Sources: Croatian Bureau of Statistics publications

== Notable natives and residents ==
- Filip Kljajić (1913–1943) - antifascist, partisan and People's Hero of Yugoslavia
