= Karakaj =

- Town center, 2026
- Interactive map of Karakaj
- Location within Bosnia and Herzegovina
- Country: Bosnia and Herzegovina
- Entity: Republika Srpska
- Municipality: Zvornik

Karakaj (Cyrillic: Каракај) is a town in the municipality of Zvornik, Bosnia and Herzegovina, on the Drina River. Located 2 km (1.2 mi) north of the city of Zvornik, it has a border checkpoint with Serbia.

== History ==
During the Bosnian War, the suburbs of Karakaj acted as prisons for local Bosniaks. 7 detention facilities were identified in the town, with reports of severe physical mistreatment in them. Bosniak men were taken from Karakaj and executed in nearby fields. The ICTY found that in early June 1992, 20 people were killed in the town's Technical School by Serbian TO. Barracks for Serbian refugees were located in the town, though they were burnt down in a fire in March 2012.

=== Flood ===
On January 19, 2023, heavy rainfall in the region caused a flood in Karakaj, resulting in the damage of 2 houses.

== Demographics ==
According to the 2013 census, the town has a population of 2,828 people. Ethnically, the town consists mainly of Serbs, with a minority of Bosniaks.

=== Ethnic composition ===
Ethnic composition – Karakaj (2013)
Serbs	2,475 (87.50%)
Bosniaks	324 (11.50%)
Croats	8 (0.30%)
Others	21 (0.70%)

== Border checkpoint ==
Karakaj has a bridge border checkpoint with Serbia over the Drina River. On April 8, 2024, vehicles over five tons were temporarily banned from crossing the bridge due to reconstruction. Since December 2, 2025, the ban was lifted.

== Sports ==
The town has a football club known as "Radnički Karakaj."

== See also ==
- Zvornik
