= Zvornik =

City in Bosnia and Herzegovina

Zvornik Зворник (Serbian)
- City
- Grad Zvornik; Град Зворник; City of Zvornik
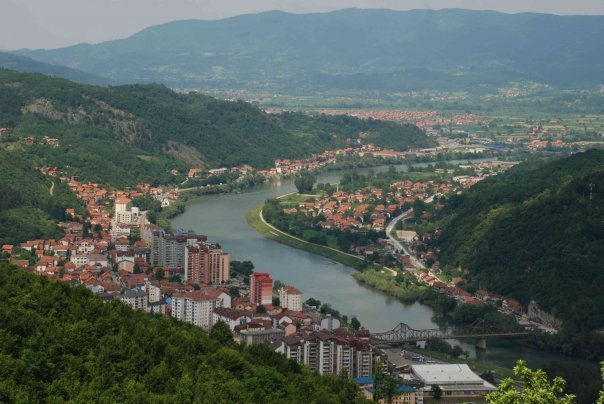
- Downtown Zvornik and Drina River

- Flag Coat of arms

- Location of Zvornik within Bosnia and Hercegovina

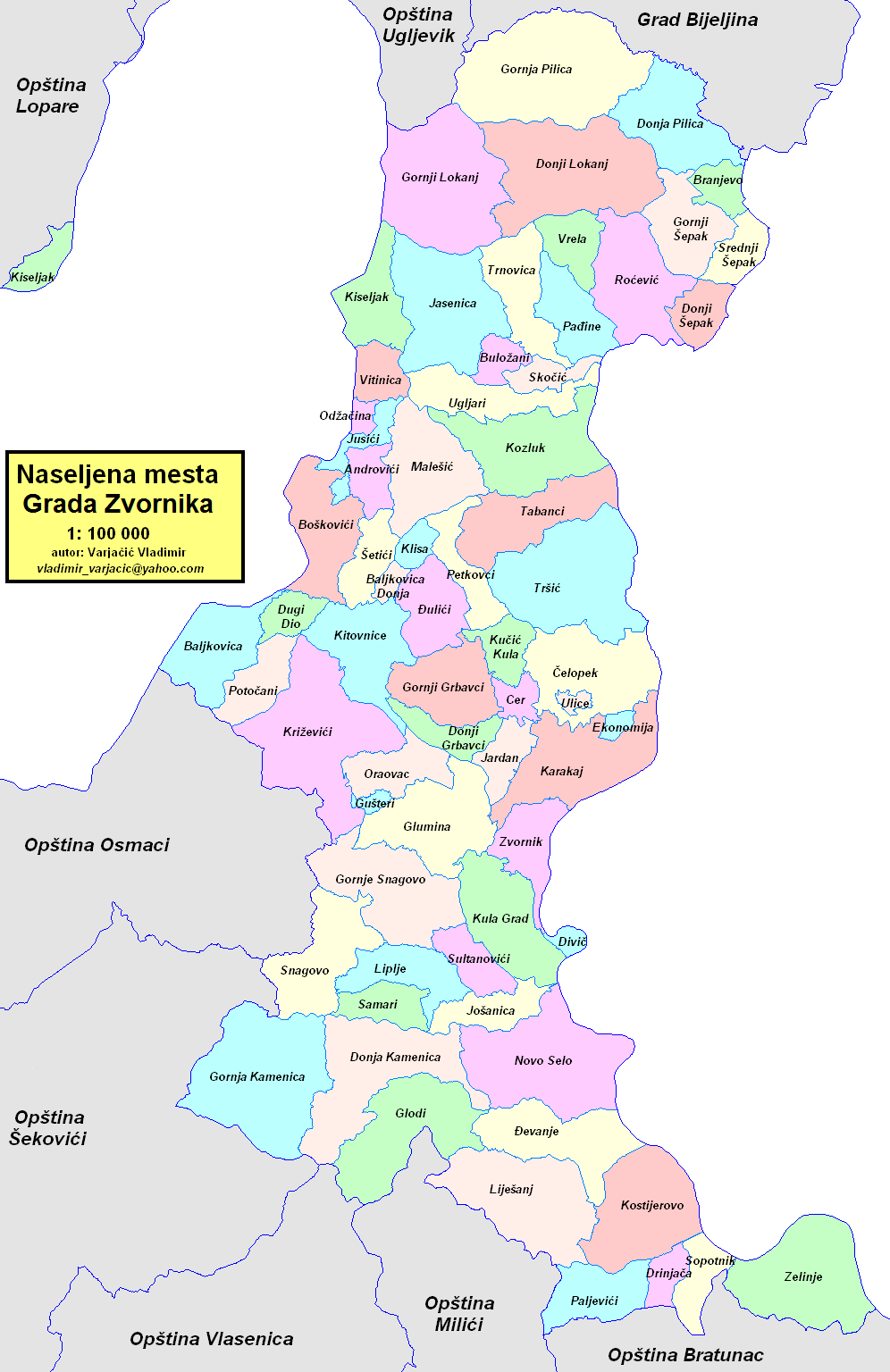
- Coordinates: 44°23′3″N 19°6′9″E
- Country: Bosnia and Herzegovina
- Entity: Republika Srpska
- Geographical region: Podrinje
- Established: December 2015

Government
  - Mayor: Bojan Ivanović (SNSD)
  - City: 376.14 km^{2} (145.23 sq mi)
- Elevation: 146 m (479 ft)

Population (2013 census)
  - Urban: 12,674
  - City: 58,856
  - City density: 156.47/km^{2} (405.26/sq mi)
- Time zone: UTC+1 (CET)
  - Summer (DST): UTC+2 (CEST)
- Area code: 56
- Website: gradzvornik.org

Zvornik (Serbian Cyrillic: Зворник, pronounced [zʋɔ̌rniːk]) is a city in Republika Srpska, Bosnia and Herzegovina. In 2013, it had a population of 58,856 inhabitants. Zvornik is located on the Drina River, on the eastern slopes of Majevica mountain, at the altitude of 146m.

The town of Mali Zvornik ("Little Zvornik") lies directly across the river in Serbia. Kula Grad, a village that is part of Zvornik municipality, has a Middle Age fort, Zvornik fortress, built in the 12th century.

== History ==
Zvornik is first mentioned in 1410, although it was known as Zvonik ("bell tower") at that time. The town's geographic location has made it an important trade link between Bosnia and the east. For instance, the main road connecting Sarajevo and Belgrade runs through the city. The medieval fort known as Kula grad was built in the early 7th century and still stands on the Mlađevac mountainous range overlooking the Drina Valley.

=== Ottoman rule ===
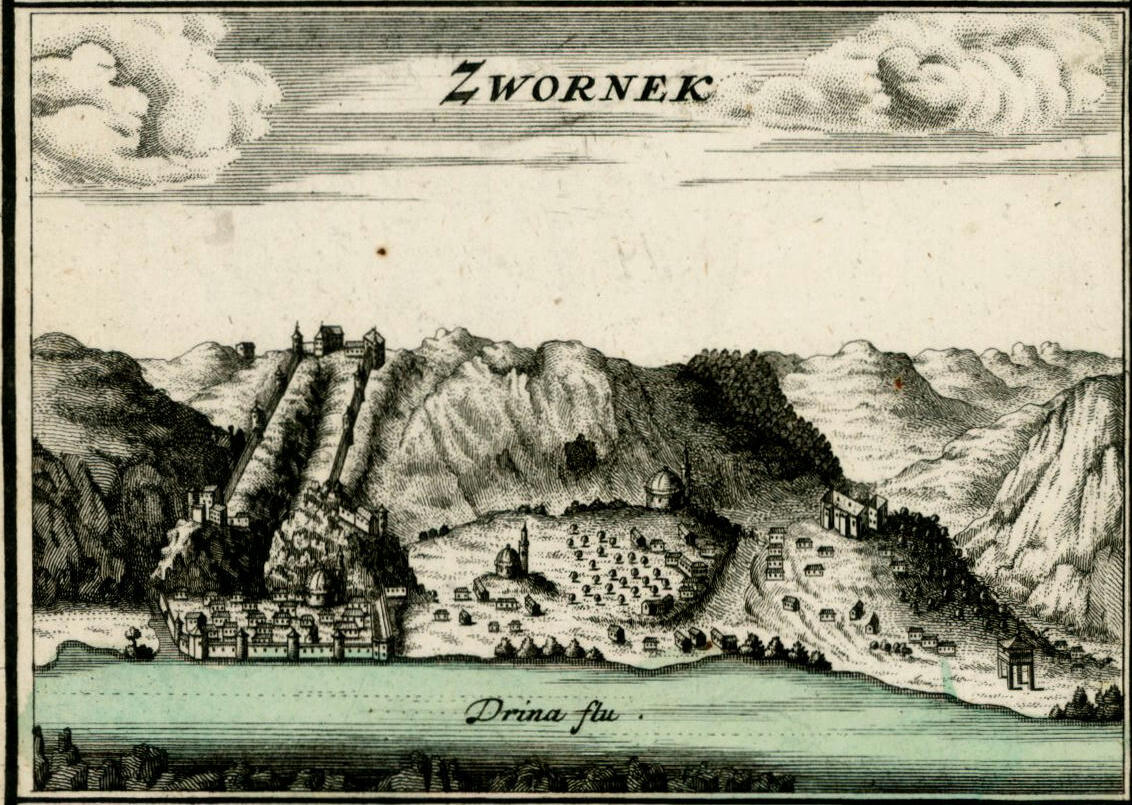
Zvornik depicted in 1738.

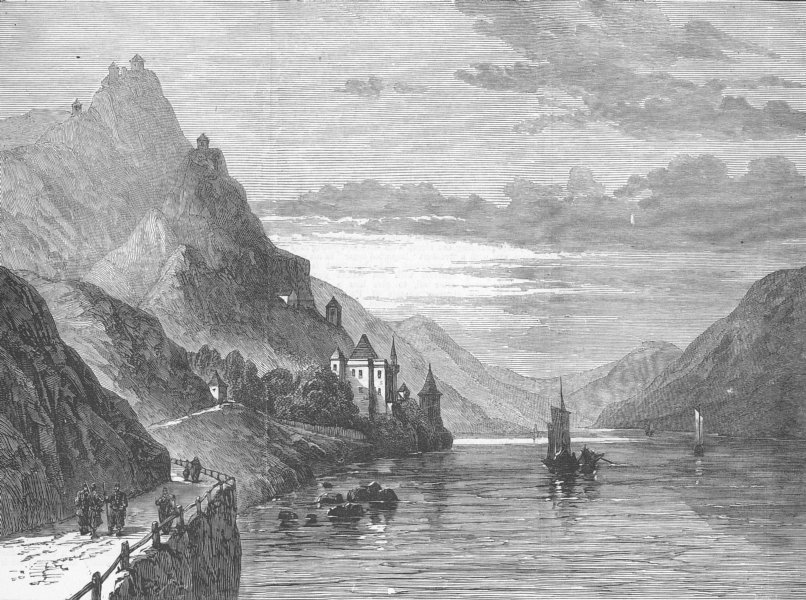
Zvornik in 1876.

During the Ottoman period, Zvornik was the capital of the Sanjak of Zvornik (an administrative region) within the Eyalet of Bosnia. This was primarily the case because of the city's crucial role in the economy and the strategic importance of the city's location. The Sanjak of Zvornik was one of six Ottoman sanjaks with most developed shipbuilding (besides the sanjaks of Vidin, Nicopolis, Požega, Smederevo and Mohač). In 1806, Zvornik was home to Mehmed-beg Kulenović.

Stojan Čupić (also known as Zmaj od Noćaja), one of the leaders of the First Serbian Uprising, was captured and murdered by the Turks in Zvornik in 1815. He was initially buried near the road from Zvornik to Tuzla, and his remains were moved to Salaš Noćajski in 1988.

=== World War II ===
Ustasha troops of the fascist Independent State of Croatia occupied Zvornik, along with most of Bosnia, in April 1941. The town was liberated in July 1943 by the 1st Proletarian Brigade during the Battle of Zvornik.

=== Bosnian war ===
During the Bosnian War (1992–1995) Zvornik's Bosniak population was expelled. The military attack of paramilitary groups that came from Serbia on Zvornik Bosniaks commenced on 8 April 1992. During April 1992, many European news stations daily reported Serb armed attacks and mass killings of the Bosniak population of Zvornik and the surrounding villages.

On 19 May 1992, combined JNA, Serb paramilitary and Arkan's Tigers took control of Zvornik and Mali Zvornik. The suburbs of Karakaj and Čelopek were places of prisons where hundreds of local Bosniaks were killed. The remaining Bosniaks and non-Serbs were relegated to concentration camps and detention facilities throughout the area. During the war, Serb forces destroyed at least 26 mosques in and around the city.

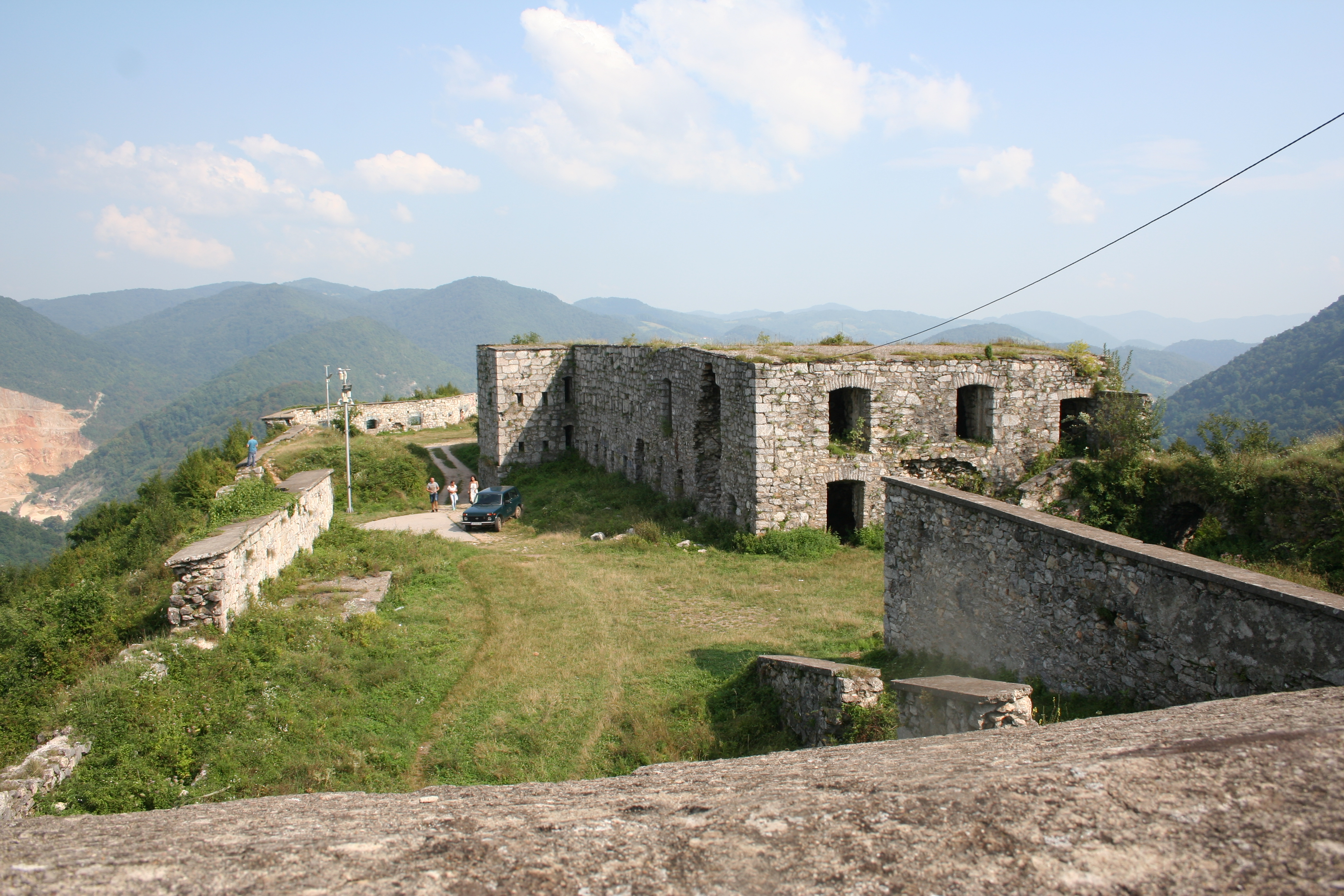
Zvornik Fortress

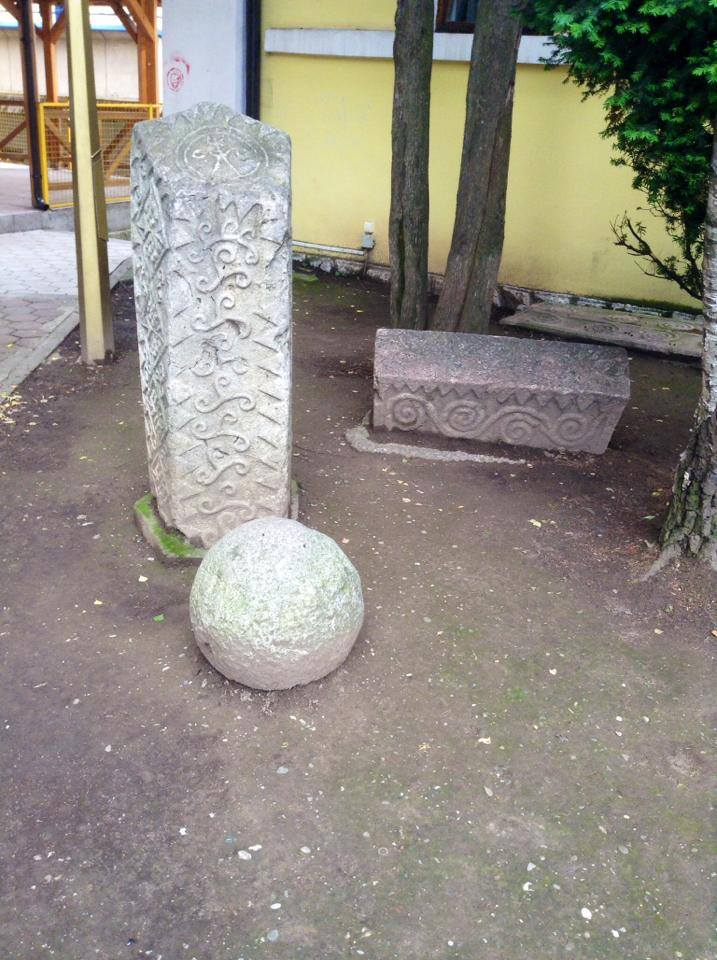
Photograph of Stećci in Zvornik

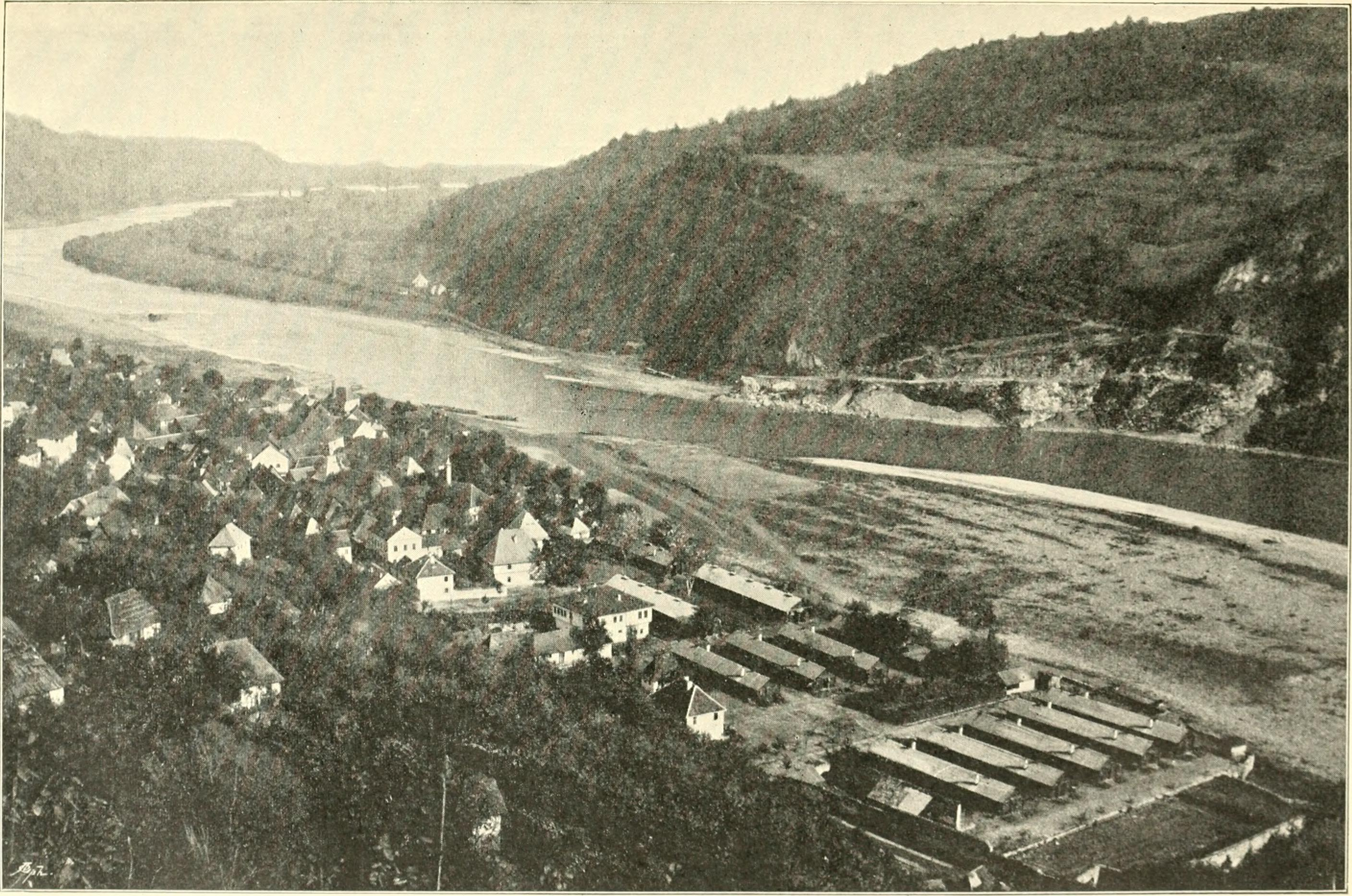
Zvornik in 1897.

Local policemen and US military personnel on their way to check a post-Dayton resettlement effort

== Settlements ==
Aside from the city proper area of Zvornik, the municipality comprises the following settlements:

- Androvići
- Baljkovica
- Baljkovica Donja
- Boškovići
- Buložani
- Čelopek
- Cer
- Divič
- Donja Pilica
- Donji Lokanj
- Drinjača
- Dugi Dio
- Đevanje
- Đulići
- Glodi
- Glumina
- Goduš
- Gornja Pilica
- Gornji Lokanj
- Grbavci Donji
- Grbavci Gornji
- Gušteri
- Jardan
- Jasenica
- Jusići
- Kamenica Donja
- Kamenica Gornja
- Kiseljak
- Kitovnice
- Klisa
- Kostijerevo
- Kozluk
- Kraljevići
- Križevići
- Kučić Kula
- Kula Grad
- Liješanj
- Liplje
- Malešići
- Marčići
- Međeđa
- Mehmedići
- Nezuk
- Novo Selo
- Pađine
- Paljevići
- Petkovci
- Potočani
- Rastošnica
- Roćević
- Rožanj
- Sapna
- Skočić
- Snagovo
- Snagovo Donje
- Snagovo Gornje
- Sopotnik
- Šepak Donji
- Šepak Gornji
- Šetići
- Tabanci
- Trnovica
- Tršić
- Ugljari
- Vitinica
- Vrela
- Zaseok
- Zelinje

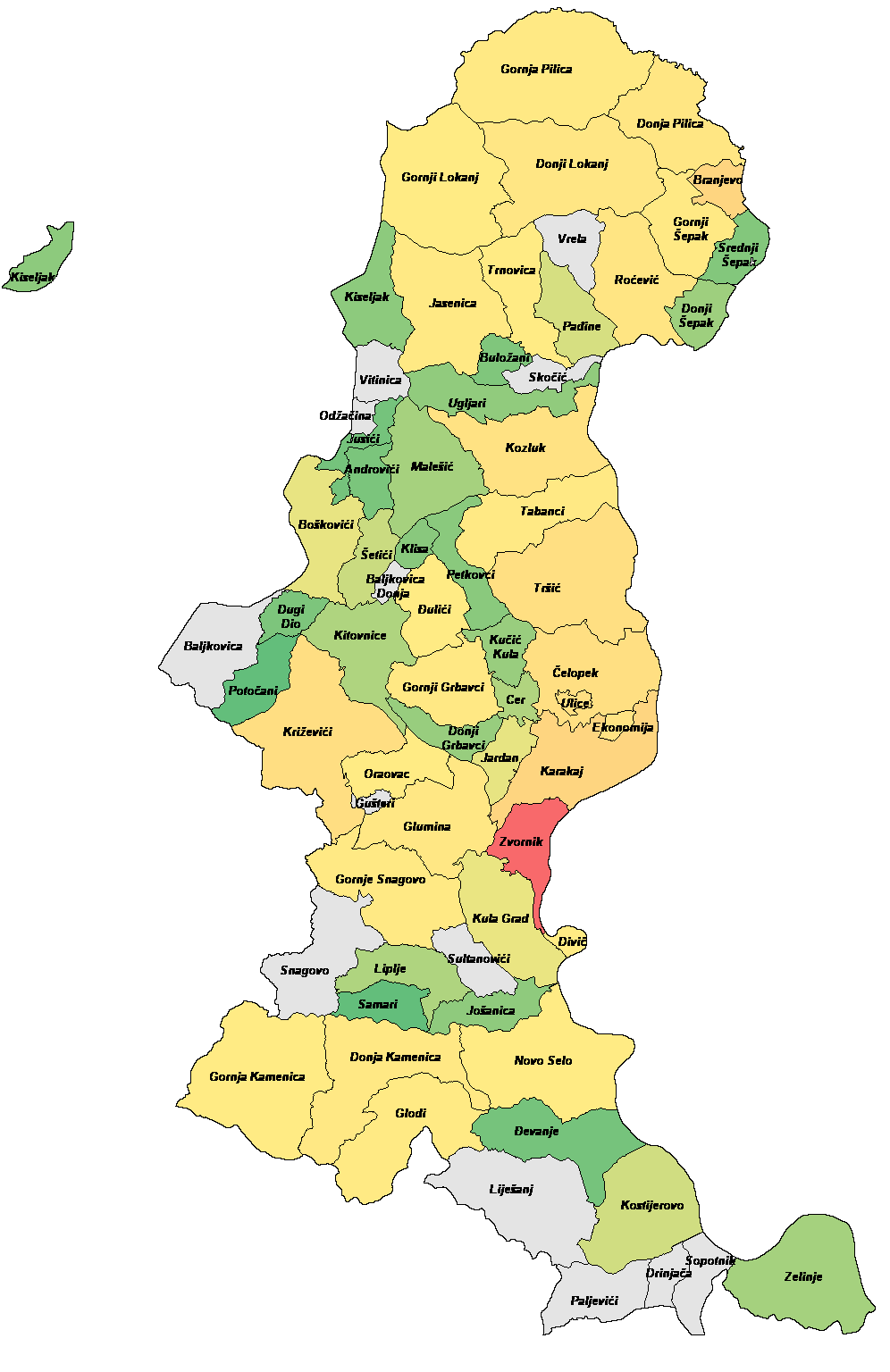
Zvornik municipality by population proportional to the settlement with the highest and lowest population

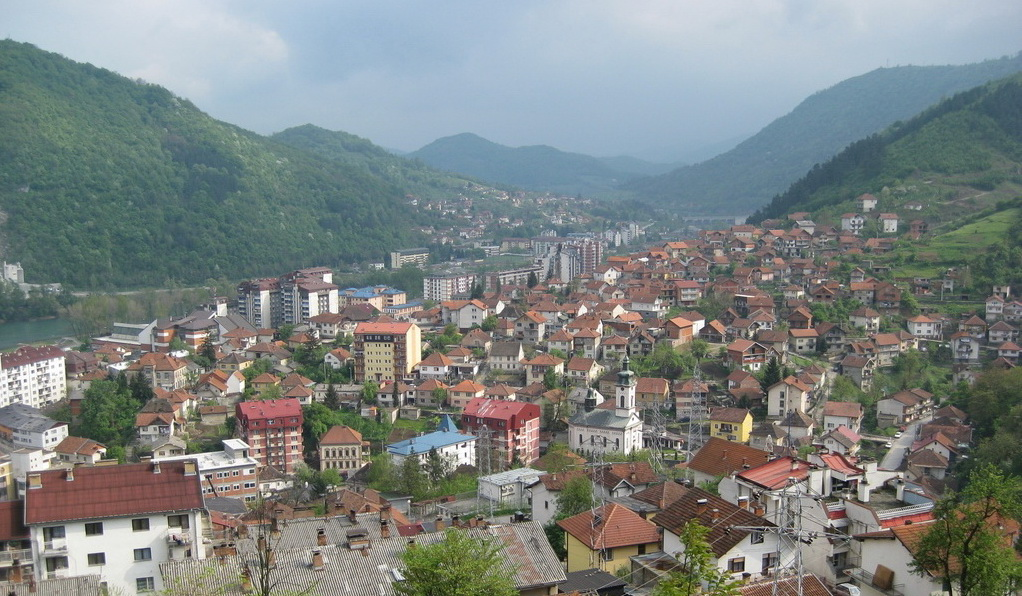
Cityscape of Zvornik

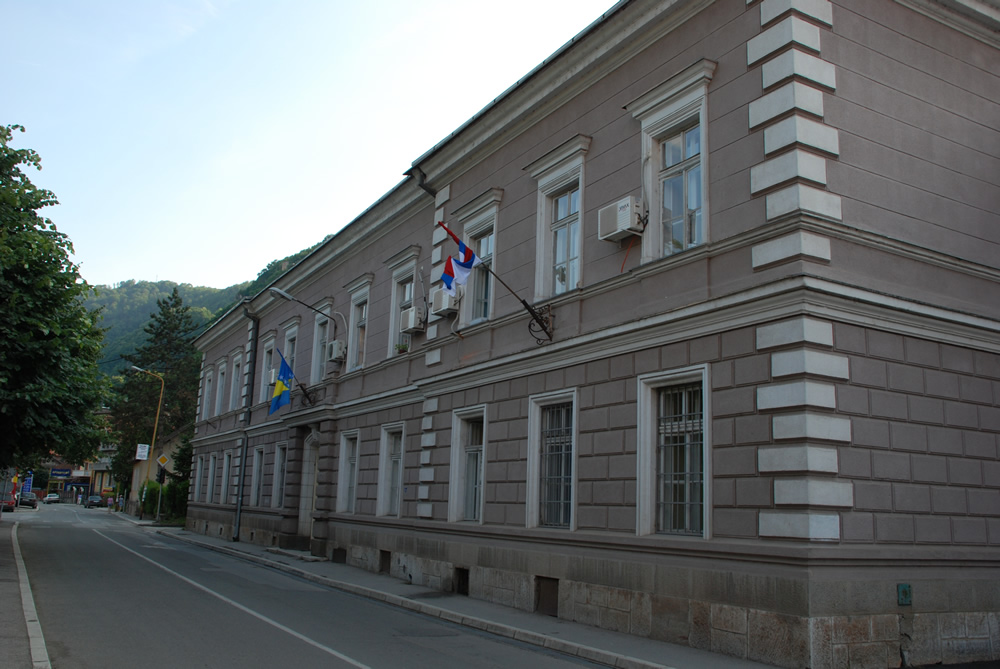
City assembly building

== Demographics ==
=== Population ===
Population of settlements – Zvornik municipality
	Settlement	1879	1885	1895	1910	1921	1931	1948	1953	1961	1971	1981	1991	2013
	Total	27,468	34,949	38,986	47,756	47,233	47,326	50,011	53,639	60,910	60,910	73,845	81,295	58,856
1	Androvići												319	291
2	Boškovići												583	566
3	Branjevo													2,694
4	Buložani												241	304
5	Čelopek												1,896	1,801
6	Cer													426
7	Đevanje												340	279
8	Divič												1,388	637
9	Donja Kamenica												1,391	974
10	Donja Pilica												1,304	1,176
11	Donji Lokanj												1,407	1,100
12	Donji Šepak												449	379
13	Dugi Dio												342	296
14	Đulići												1,043	697
15	Ekonomija													1,366
16	Glodi												1,260	759
17	Glumina												2,399	993
18	Gornja Kamenica												1,609	622
19	Gornja Pilica												1,104	816
20	Gornje Snagovo												1,238	842
21	Gornji Grbavci												939	962
22	Gornji Lokanj												901	658
23	Gornji Šepak												1,964	895
24	Grbavci Donji												1,058	363
25	Jardan												1,532	563
26	Jasenica												950	877
27	Jošanica													340
28	Jusići												500	275
29	Karakaj													2,731
30	Kiseljak												580	335
31	Kitovnice												621	422
32	Klisa												617	325
33	Kostijerevo												1,230	506
34	Kozluk												3,017	1,543
35	Križevići												2,310	1,888
36	Kučić Kula												970	366
37	Kula Grad												1,120	571
38	Liplje													422
39	Malešić												736	398
40	Novo Selo												1,262	622
41	Oraovac													674
42	Pađine												560	519
43	Petkovci												877	329
44	Potočani												344	229
45	Roćević												1,235	1,220
46	Samari													230
47	Šetići												741	489
48	Srednji Šepak													312
49	Tabanci												1,180	848
50	Trnovica												1,033	659
51	Tršić												2,097	1,744
52	Ugljari												609	345
53	Ulice													1,795
54	Zelinje												529	397
55	Zvornik							4,320	7,483	5.444	8,538	12,147	14,584	12,674

=== Ethnic composition ===
Ethnic composition – Zvornik city
	1971	1981	1991	2013
Total	8,538	12,147	14,584	12,674
Bosniaks	5,736 (67.18%)	6,686 (55.04%)	8,854 (60.71%)	
Serbs	2,424 (28.39%)	3,491 (28.74%)	4,235 (29.04%)	
Yugoslavs	24 (0.281%)	1,597 (13.15%)	944 (6.473%)	
Others	141 (1.651%)	72 (0.593%)	475 (3.257%)	
Croats	83 (0.972%)	66 (0.543%)	76 (0.521%)	
Roma	49 (0.574%)	135 (1.111%)		
Albanians	26 (0.305%)	48 (0.395%)		
Montenegrins	27 (0.316%)	35 (0.288%)		
Slovenes	16 (0.187%)	7 (0.058%)		
Macedonians	3 (0.035%)	6 (0.049%)		
Hungarians	9 (0.105%)	4 (0.033%)		

Ethnic composition – Zvornik municipality
	1971	1981	1991	2013
Total	60,910	73,845	81,295	58,856
Serbs	27,769 (45.59%)	30,064 (40.71%)	30,863 (37.96%)	38,579 (65.55%)
Bosniaks	32,504 (53.36%)	40,801 (55.,25%)	48,102 (59.17%)	19,855 (33.73%)
Others	316 (0.519%)	295 (0.399%)	960 (1.181%)	316 (0.537%)
Croats	107 (0.176%)	104 (0.141%)	122 (0.150%)	106 (0.180%)
Yugoslavs	49 (0.080%)	2,110 (2.857%)	1,248 (1.535%)	
Roma	49 (0.080%)	335 (0.454%)		
Albanians	31 (0.051%)	58 (0.079%)		
Montenegrins	44 (0.072%)	47 (0.064%)		
Macedonians	10 (0.016%)	12 (0.016%)		
Slovenes	18 (0.030%)	12 (0.016%)		
Hungarians	13 (0.021%)	7 (0.009%)		

== Economy ==
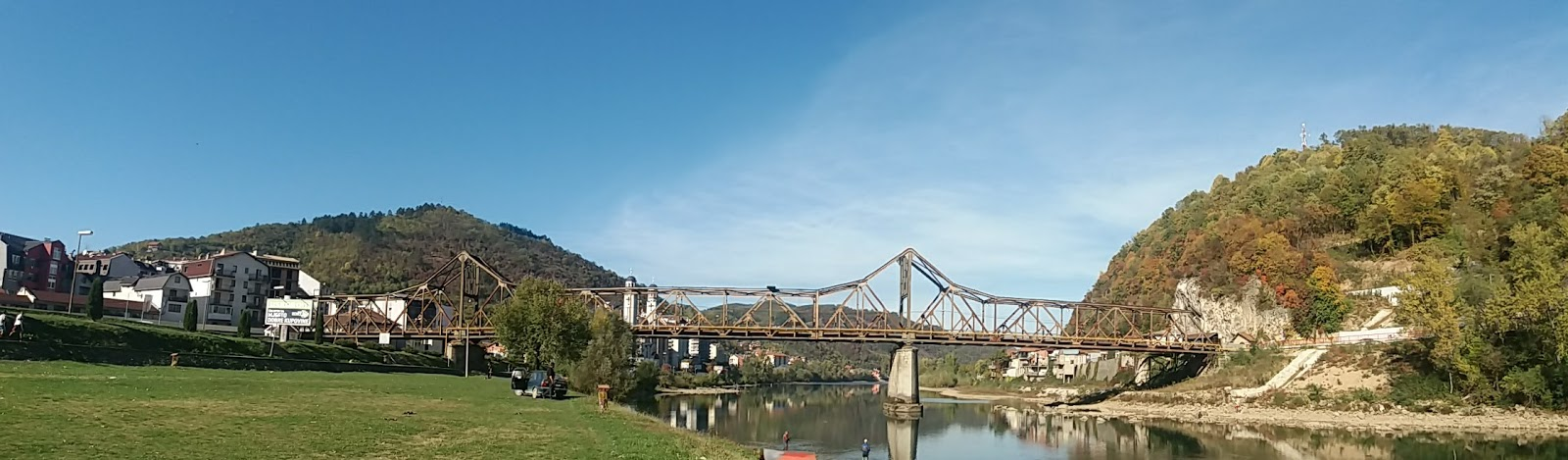
King Alexander I of Yugoslavia bridge

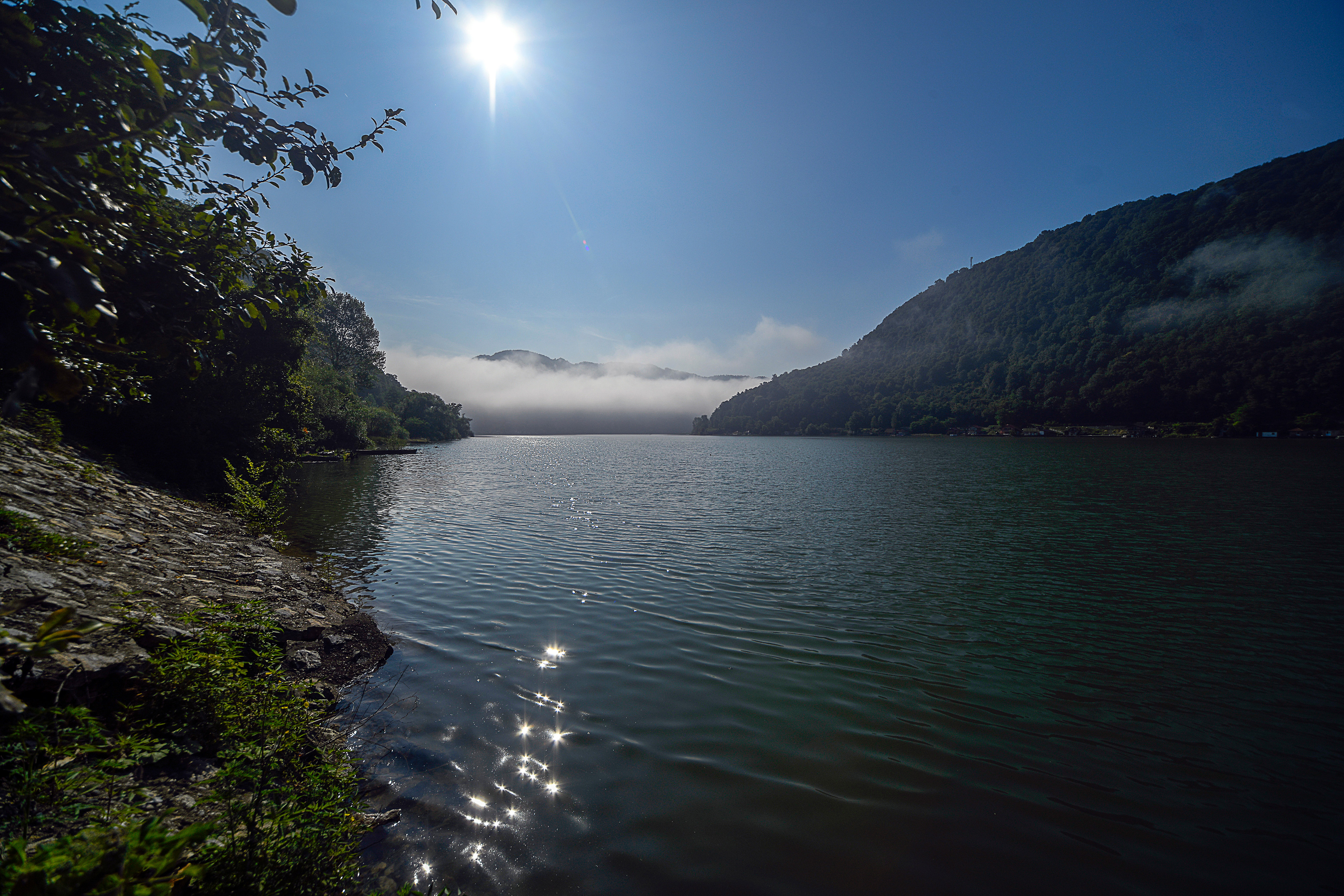
Zvornik Lake

The table shows the number of registered people employed in legal entities by their core activity in 2018:

Activity	Total
Agriculture, forestry and fishing	80
Mining and quarrying	19
Manufacturing	3,176
Electricity, gas, steam and air conditioning supply	186
Water supply; sewerage, waste management and remediation activities	173
Construction	665
Wholesale and retail trade, repair of motor vehicles and motorcycles	1,444
Transportation and storage	603
Accommodation and food services	415
Information and communication	105
Financial and insurance activities	103
Real estate activities	12
Professional, scientific and technical activities	114
Administrative and support service activities	28
Public administration and defense; compulsory social security	688
Education	801
Human health and social work activities	665
Arts, entertainment and recreation	76
Other service activities	126
Total	9,479

== Culture ==
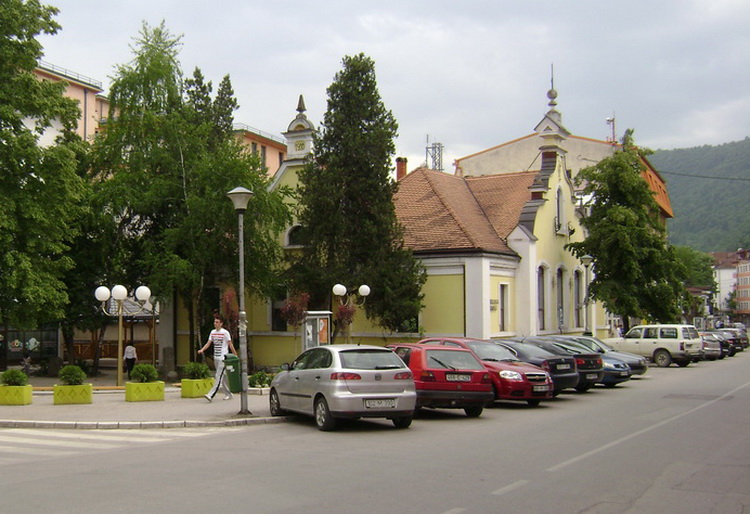
City museum and library

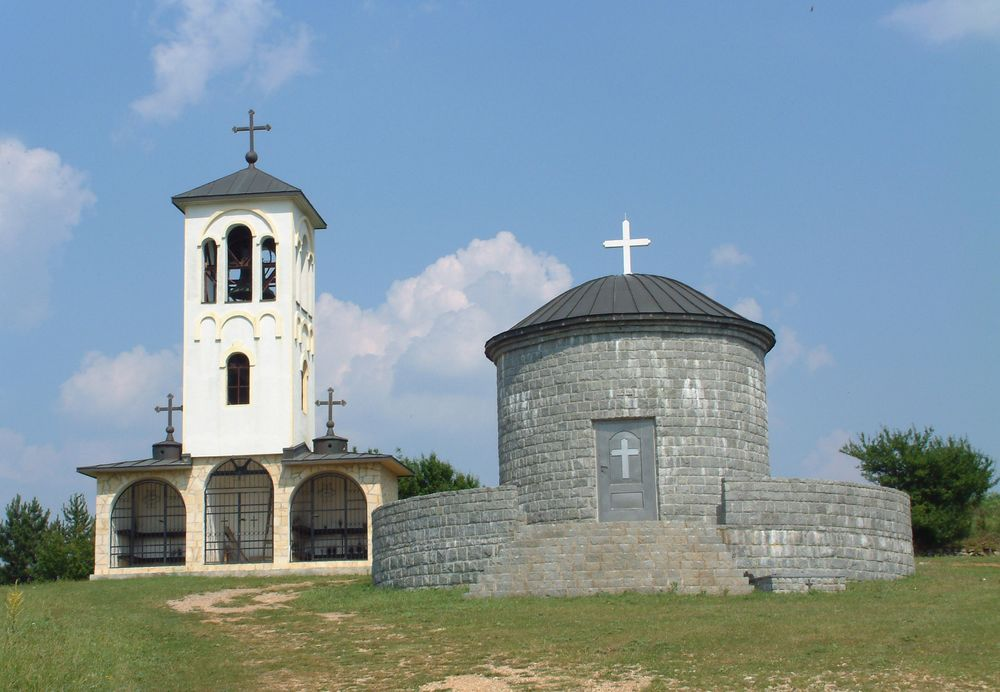
Church of Saint Petka

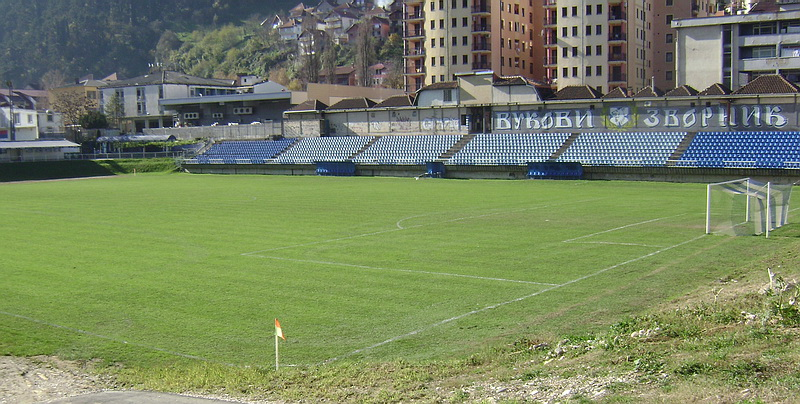
City stadium

The Cultural Summer of Zvornik (Zvorničko kulturno ljeto) is an annual event held in the first week of August, usually for six days. Its main objective is to become a traditional cultural event which will open the doors of Zvornik for recognized cultural values.

The festival was first held in August 2001 as a local event and has grown to be one of the biggest festivals in the Balkans.

In 2007, famous singers such as Neda Ukraden and Sandi Cenov participated, but in 2008 theis festival featured some of the most notable stars from former Yugoslavia, like Željko Joksimović, Hari Mata Hari, Van Gogh and Marinko Rokvić. There is also a regatta on the river Drina, a fun marathon and many cultural events and competitions during day and night.

== International co-operation ==
Zvornik is twinned with:

- Sremska Mitrovica, Serbia

Other friendships and cooperations, protocols, memorandums:

- Kolchugino, Russia

== Sport ==
The local football clubs, FK Drina Zvornik and ŽFK Drina Zvornik, play in the First League of the Republika Srpska. Members of the First league of Republika Srpska also are volleyball and handball clubs Zvornik.

== Notable people ==
- Seka Aleksić, singer
- Ermin Bičakčić, footballer
- Rade Đokić, footballer
- Amer Hrustanović, sports wrestler, European medallist
- Said Husejinović, footballer
- Goran Ikonić, basketball player
- Zlatko Junuzović, Austrian footballer
- Samir Muratović, footballer
- Nada Obrić, singer
- Denis Omerbegović, footballer
- Borisav Pisić, athlete
- Sejad Salihović, footballer
- Alan Ibrahimagić, basketball coach

== See also ==
- Podrinje
- Drina
