= Čelopek, Zvornik =

Čelopek
- Village
- Interactive map of Čelopek
- Country: Bosnia and Herzegovina
- Administrative region: Republika Srpska
- City: Zvornik

Population (2013)
  - Total: 1,830
- Time zone: UTC+1 (CET)
  - Summer (DST): UTC+2 (CEST)
- Area code(s): (+387) 56

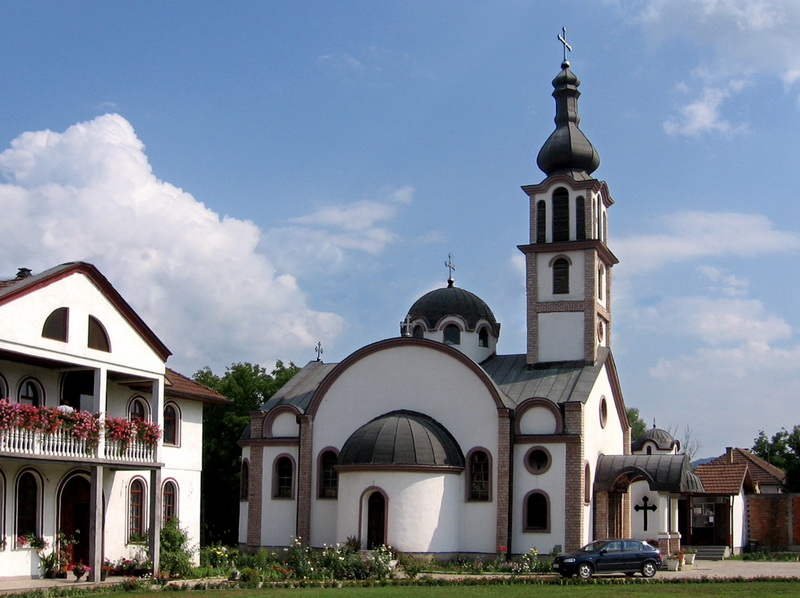
An image from the Čelopek, Zvornik village

Čelopek (Serbian Cyrillic: Челопек) is a village within the municipality of Zvornik, on the Drina river in northeastern Bosnia and Herzegovina.
