= Ethnic cleansing in the Bosnian War =

- Part of the Bosnian War
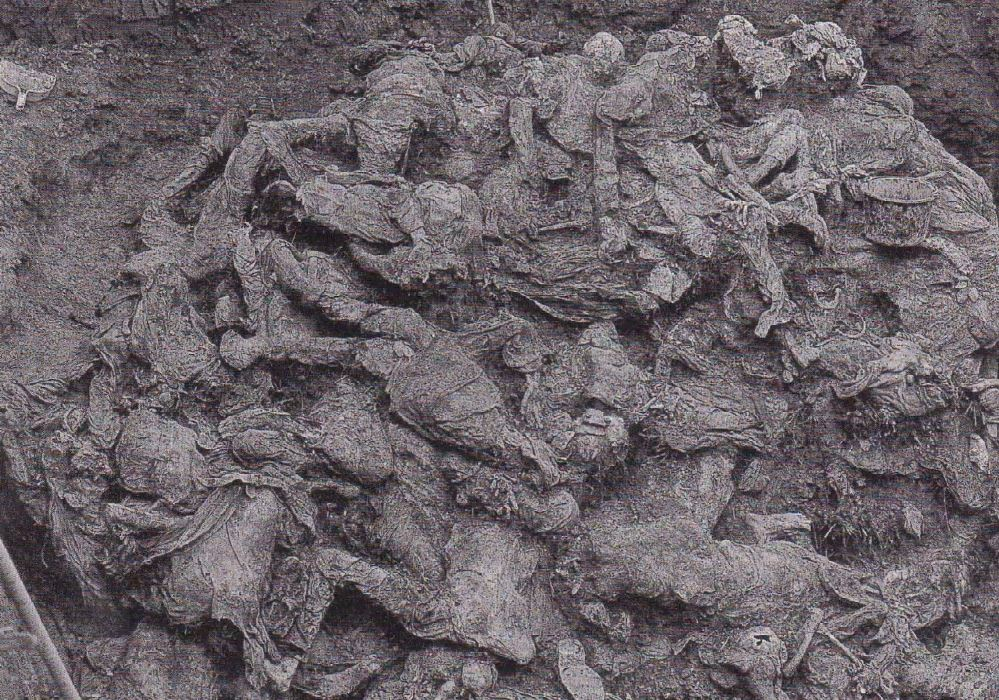
- Exhumed victims of ethnic cleansing through murder in the Srebrenica massacre

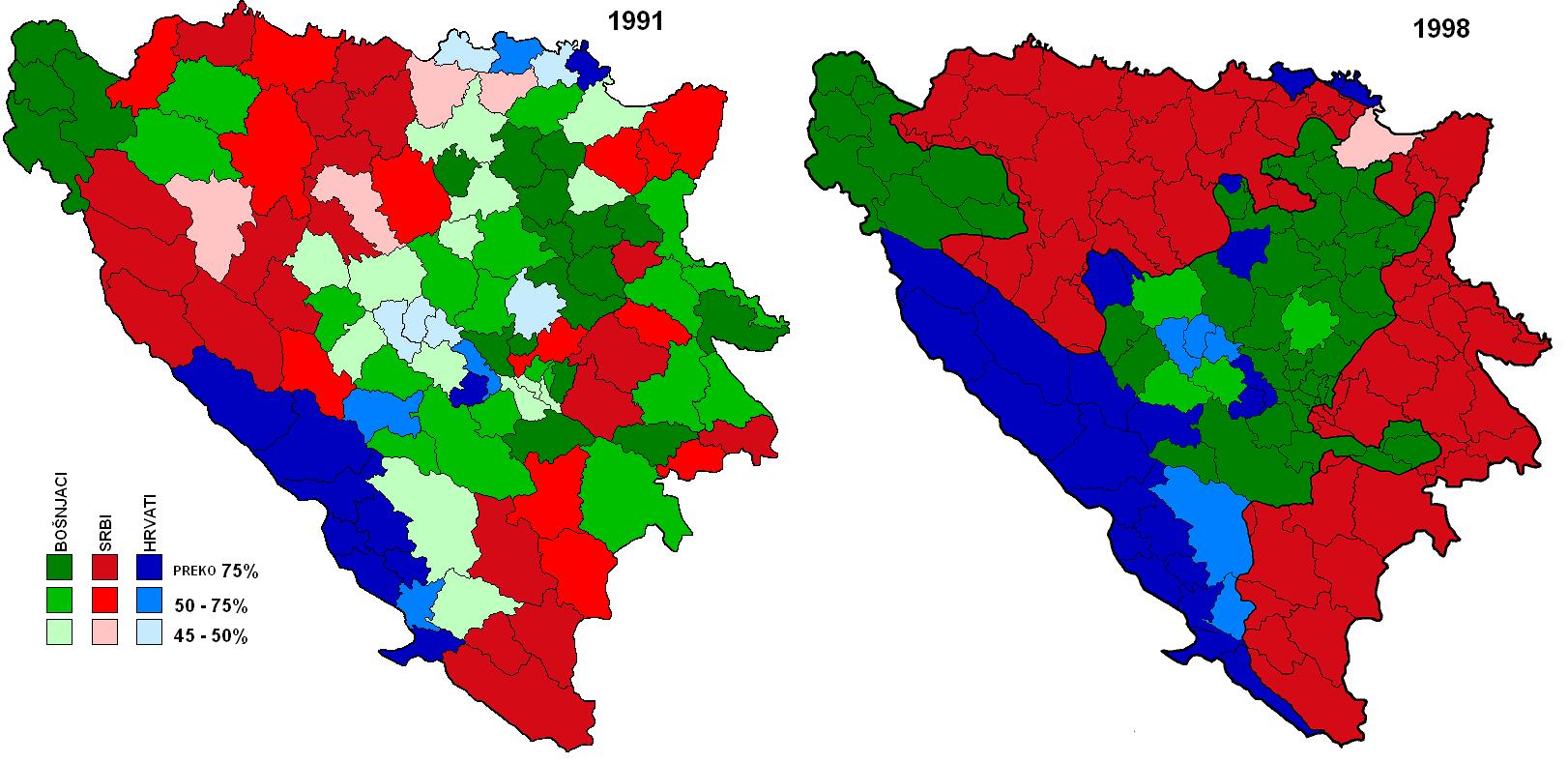
- Ethnic distribution at the municipal level in Bosnia and Herzegovina before (1991) and after the war (1998)
- Location: 43°52′N 18°25′E; Bosnia and Herzegovina
- Date: 1992 – 1995
- Target: Bosnian Muslims, Serbs, Croats, Romani people
- Attack type: Ethnic cleansing, genocide, deportation, forced displacement, genocidal rape, mass murder, destruction of cultural heritage
- Deaths: Tens of thousands
- Injuries: 18,000–25,000 women and men raped
- Victim: 1.0–1.3 million deported or forcibly resettled
- Perpetrators: Army of Republika Srpska, Scorpions, Special Operations Unit, Serb Volunteer Guard (confirmed by ICTY verdicts); Croatian Defence Council (confirmed by ICTY verdicts); Army of the Republic of Bosnia and Herzegovina (alleged by some Serb and Croat sources)
- Motive: Ethnic nationalism, irredentism

Ethnic cleansing occurred during the Bosnian War (1992–95) as large numbers of Bosniaks and Croats were forced to flee their homes or were expelled by the Army of Republika Srpska and Serb paramilitaries. Bosnian Serbs had also been forced to flee or were expelled by Bosnian Muslim and Croat forces, though on a restricted scale and in lesser numbers. The UN Security Council Final Report (1994) states while Bosnian Muslims also engaged in "grave breaches of the Geneva Conventions and other violations of international humanitarian law", they "have not engaged in "systematic ethnic cleansing". According to the report, "there is no factual basis for arguing that there is a 'moral equivalence' between the warring factions".

Beginning in 1991, political upheavals in Bosnia and Herzegovina displaced about 2.7 million people by mid-1992, of which over 700,000 sought asylum in other European countries, making it the largest exodus in Europe at the time since World War II. It is estimated between 1.0 and 1.3 million people were uprooted in these ethnic cleansing campaigns, and that tens of thousands were killed.

The methods used during the Bosnian ethnic cleansing campaigns include "killing of civilians, rape, torture, destruction of civilian, public, and cultural property, looting and pillaging, and the forcible relocation of civilian populations". Most of the perpetrators of these campaigns were Serb forces and most of the victims were Bosniaks. The UN-backed International Criminal Tribunal for the former Yugoslavia (ICTY) later convicted several officials for persecution on political, racial and religious grounds; forced transfer and deportation constituting a crime against humanity. The Srebrenica massacre, which was also included as part of the ethnic cleansing campaign, was found to constitute the crime of genocide.

== Historical background ==
The Kingdom of Bosnia was annexed by the Ottoman Empire from 1463 until 1878. During this period, large parts of its population, mostly Bosniaks (Bosnian Muslims), converted to Islam, giving its society its multiethnic character. Bosnia and Herzegovina's ethnic groups—the Bosniaks, Bosnian Serbs and Bosnian Croats—lived peacefully together from 1878 until the outbreak of World War I in 1914, before which intermittent tensions between the three groups were mostly the result of economic issues, though Serbia had had territorial pretensions towards Bosnia and Herzegovina at least since 1878. According to some historians, certain Serb and Croat nationalists, who practiced Orthodox and Catholic Christianity, respectively, never accepted Bosniaks as a nationality and tried to assimilate them into their own cultures. World War II lead to interethnic clashes, though the three groups were evenly split between various factions and did not rally universally along the ethnic lines. After World War II, Bosnia and Herzegovina became part of the Socialist Federative Republic of Yugoslavia.

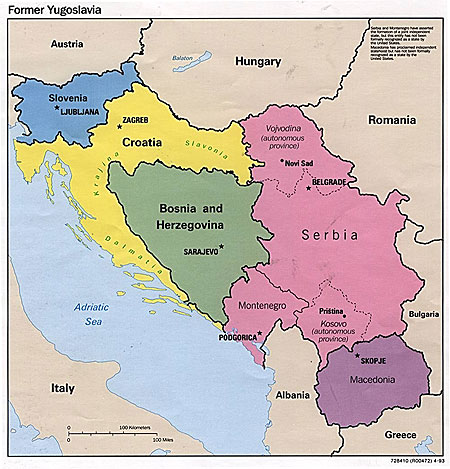
1993 map of the former Yugoslavia

After the death of its leader Josip Broz Tito, Yugoslavia experienced a dysfunctional political system and economic calamity in the 1980s. As communism was losing its potency, new nationalist leaders Slobodan Milošević in Serbia and Franjo Tuđman in Croatia came to power. Slovenia and Croatia called for reforms and a looser confederation of the state in Yugoslavia but this call was opposed by the country's government in Belgrade. On 25 June 1991, Slovenia and Croatia declared independence from Yugoslavia. A short armed conflict followed in Slovenia and the Croatian War of Independence escalated. Macedonia also declared independence, which Yugoslavia granted without conflict. The RAM Plan began to be implemented, laying the foundations for new borders of a "Third Yugoslavia" in an effort to establish a country where "all Serbs with their territories would live together in the same state".

The Izetbegović-Gligorov Plan offered a restructuring of Yugoslavia based on the principle 2+2+2, with Serbia and Montenegro as the core of an asymmetric federation, with Bosnia and Macedonia in a loose federation, and with Croatia and Slovenia in an even looser confederation. The plan was not accepted by either side. In late 1991, the Serbs began establishing autonomous regions in Bosnia. When the Party of Democratic Action's (SDA) representatives in the Parliament of the Republic of Bosnia and Herzegovina announced their plan for a referendum on independence from Yugoslavia on 14 October 1991, leading Bosnian Serb politician Radovan Karadžić, of the Serb Democratic Party (SDS), made a speech at the parliamentary session and publicly threatened war and the extinction of the Bosniaks as a people. On 9 January 1992, the Bosnian Serb Assembly proclaimed the "Republic of Serbian people of Bosnia and Herzegovina", which would include territory with a Serb majority and "additional territories, not precisely identified but to include areas where the Serbs had been in a majority" before World War II.

On 29 February and 1 March 1992, Bosnia and Herzegovina held an independence referendum, after which it declared independence from Yugoslavia. Most Bosnian Serbs wanted to remain in the same state with Serbia. During the 16th session of the Bosnian Serb Assembly on 12 May 1992, Karadžić, who was by then the leader of the self-proclaimed Republika Srpska proto-state, presented his "six strategic goals", which included the "separation from the other two national communities and the separation of states", and the "creation of a corridor in the Drina Valley thus eliminating the Drina [River] as a border between Serbian states". Republika Srpska General Ratko Mladić identified "Muslims and Croat hordes" as the enemy and suggested to the Assembly it must decide whether to throw them out by political means or through force.

The Bosnian War quickly escalated. Serb forces were composed of the Army of Republika Srpska (VRS), the Yugoslav People's Army (JNA) and Serbian and Bosnian Serb paramilitary forces. Their aim was to form either a rump Yugoslavia or a Greater Serbia. The Serb authorities in Belgrade wanted to annex new territories for Serbs in Bosnia and Croatia that would eventually be added to Serbia and Montenegro.

At the start of the war, Bosniak forces that were organized in the Army of the Republic of Bosnia and Herzegovina (ARBiH), and Croat forces that were organized in the Croatian Defence Council (HVO), initially cooperated against the Yugoslav People's Army (JNA) and the Army of Republika Srpska (Bosnian Serb Army or VRS). The Croatian Defence Council (HVO) was the official army of the Croatian Republic of Herzeg-Bosnia (HR HB), a separate "political, cultural, economic and territorial entity" within Bosnia proclaimed by Mate Boban on 18 November 1991. The HVO said it had no secessionary goal and vowed to respect the central government in Sarajevo. The HR HB was financed and armed by Croatia. International officials and the International Criminal Tribunal for the Former Yugoslavia (ICTY) concluded that the aim of the establishment of HR HB was to form a Greater Croatia from parts of Bosnia and Herzegovina, in effect partitioning Bosnia and Herzegovina between an expanded Serbia and Croatia.

== Definitions ==
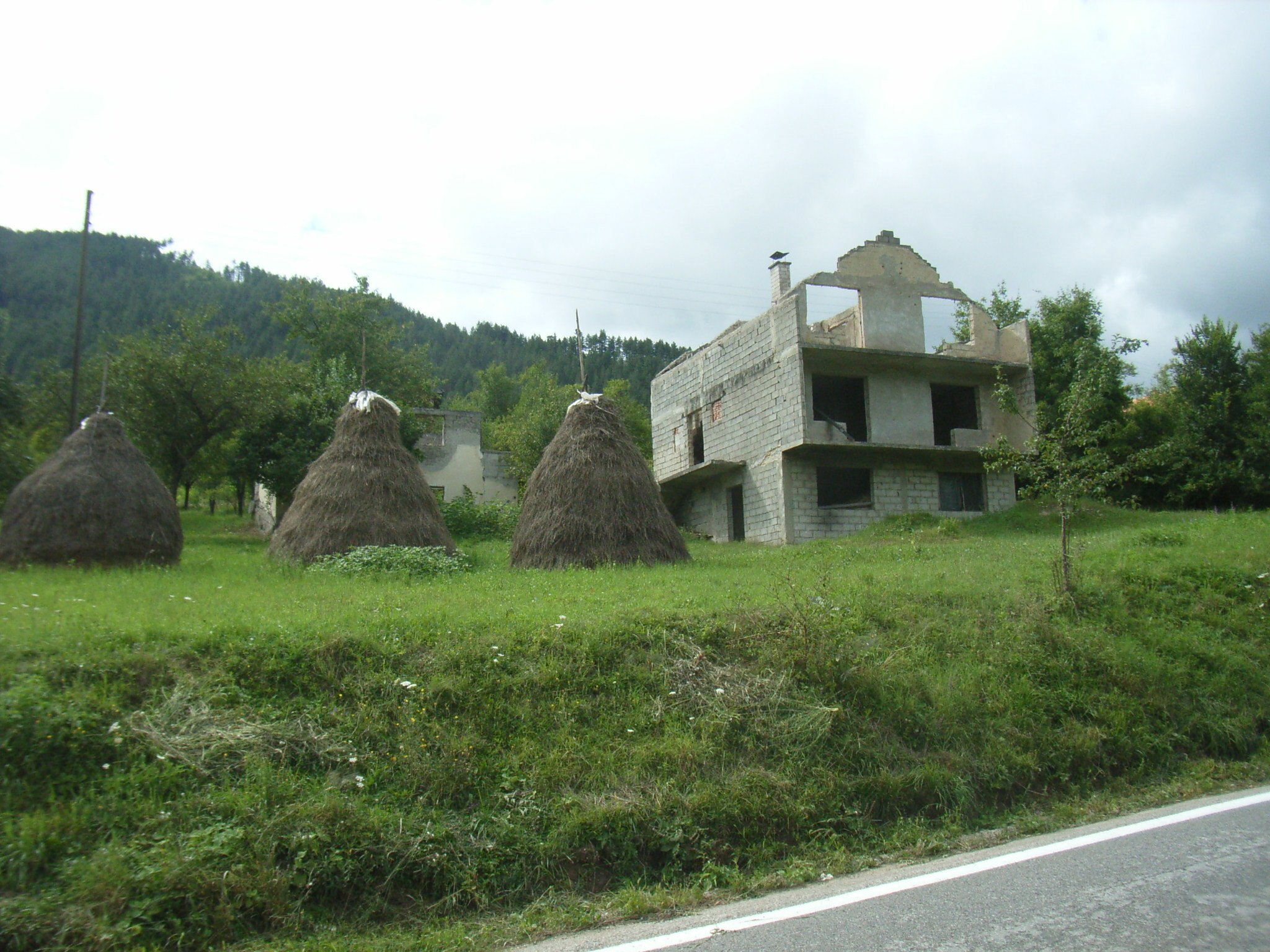
A destroyed house in the Višegrad municipality

Ethnic cleansing is a purposeful policy of "rendering an area ethnically homogeneous by using force or intimidation to remove from a given area persons from another ethnic group".

A report by the UN Commission of Experts dated 27 May 1994 defined ethnic cleansing as an act of "rendering an area ethnically homogenous by using force or intimidation to remove persons of given groups from the area", and found that ethnic cleansing has been carried out through "murder, torture, arbitrary arrest and detention, extra-judicial executions, rape and sexual assaults, confinement of civilian populations in ghetto areas, forcible removal, displacement and deportation of civilian populations, deliberate military attacks or threats of attacks on civilians and civilian areas, and wanton destruction of property". Such forms of persecution of a group were defined as crimes against humanity and they can also fall within the meaning of the Genocide Convention.

The terms "ethnic cleansing" and "genocide" are not synonymous but academic discourse considers both to exist within a spectrum of assaults on nations or ethnoreligious groups. Ethnic cleansing is similar to the forced deportation or population transfer of a group to change the ethnic composition of a territory whereas genocide is aimed at the destruction of a group. To draw a distinction between the terms, the International Court of Justice (ICJ) delivered a verdict in the Bosnian Genocide Case:

It [i.e. ethnic cleansing] can only be a form of genocide within the meaning of the [Genocide] Convention, if it corresponds to or falls within one of the categories of acts prohibited by Article II of the Convention. Neither the intent, as a matter of policy, to render an area "ethnically homogeneous", nor the operations that may be carried out to implement such policy, can as such be designated as genocide: the intent that characterizes genocide is "to destroy, in whole or in part" a particular group, and deportation or displacement of the members of a group, even if effected by force, is not necessarily equivalent to destruction of that group, nor is such destruction an automatic consequence of the displacement. This is not to say that acts described as 'ethnic cleansing' may never constitute genocide, if they are such as to be characterized as, for example, 'deliberately inflicting on the group conditions of life calculated to bring about its physical destruction in whole or in part', contrary to Article II, paragraph (c), of the Convention, provided such action is carried out with the necessary specific intent (dolus specialis), that is to say with a view to the destruction of the group, as distinct from its removal from the region. — ICJ.

== International reports ==
The United States Senate Committee on Foreign Relations published a staff report on the ethnic cleansing in Bosnia in August 1992. On 17 November the same year, United Nations special rapporteur Tadeusz Mazowiecki issued a report titled "Situation of Human Rights in the Territory of the Former Yugoslavia" to the United Nations (UN). In the report, the ethnic cleansing in Bosnia and Herzegovina was singled out and described as a political objective of Serb nationalists who wanted to ensure control of territories with a Serb majority as well as "adjacent territories assimilated to them". Paramilitaries played a major role in ethnic cleansing, according to the report.

On 18 December 1992, the United Nations General Assembly issued resolution 47/147, in which it rejected the "acquisition of territory by force" and condemned "in the strongest possible terms the abhorrent practice of 'ethnic cleansing' ", and recognised "the Serbian leadership in territories under their control in Bosnia and Herzegovina, the Yugoslav Army and the political leadership of the Republic of Serbia bear primary responsibility for this reprehensible practice".

On 1 January 1993, Helsinki Watch released a report on the conflicts in the former Yugoslavia. It found ethnic cleansing was "the most egregious violations in both Croatia and Bosnia-Hercegovina" because it envisaged "summary execution, disappearance, arbitrary detention, deportation and forcible displacement of hundreds of thousands of people on the basis of their religion or nationality".

United Nations Security Council Resolution 780 authorised the establishment of a Commission of Experts to record the crimes in the former Yugoslavia, including Bosnia and Herzegovina. On 27 May 1994, these reports, which described the policy of ethnic cleansing, were concluded. The United States Senate Committee on Foreign Relations held a hearing on war crimes in the Balkans on 9 August 1995.

On 15 November 1999, the UN released its "Report of the Secretary-General pursuant to General Assembly resolution 53/35: The fall of Srebrenica [A/54/549]", which details the fall of Srebrenica in July 1995 and found it was part of the larger Serb ethnic cleansing plan to depopulate Bosnian territories they wanted to annex so Serbs could repopulate them.

== Campaigns and methods ==
The methods used during the Bosnian ethnic cleansing campaigns included "killing of civilians, rape, torture, destruction of civilian, public, and cultural property, looting and pillaging, and the forcible relocation of civilian populations". They also included administrative measures, such as one ethnic group losing their jobs, experiencing discrimination or denial of hospital treatment. The forcible displacement of civilian populations was a consequence of the conflict and its objective through the ethnic cleansing campaign. The Serb campaign included selective murder of civic, religious and intellectual representatives of Bosniaks and Croats; the sending of adult men into concentration camps and the rape of women. The Serb campaign also included the destruction and burning of Croat and Bosniak historical, religious and cultural sites.

=== Serb forces ===
Between 700,000 and a 1,000,000 Bosniaks were expelled from their homes from the Bosnian territory held by the Serb forces. Another source estimates that at least 750,000 Bosniaks and a smaller number of Croats were expulsed from these areas. Additionally, around 30,000 Romani were also ousted. Methods used to achieve this included coercion and terror in order to pressure Bosniaks, Croats and others into leaving Serb-claimed areas. Tomasz Kamusella writes that Serbian leaders expected they could engage in this practice with impunity, given that no international reaction had occurred in 1989 when communist Bulgaria had expelled (ethnically cleansed) 360,000 of its Turks and Muslims.

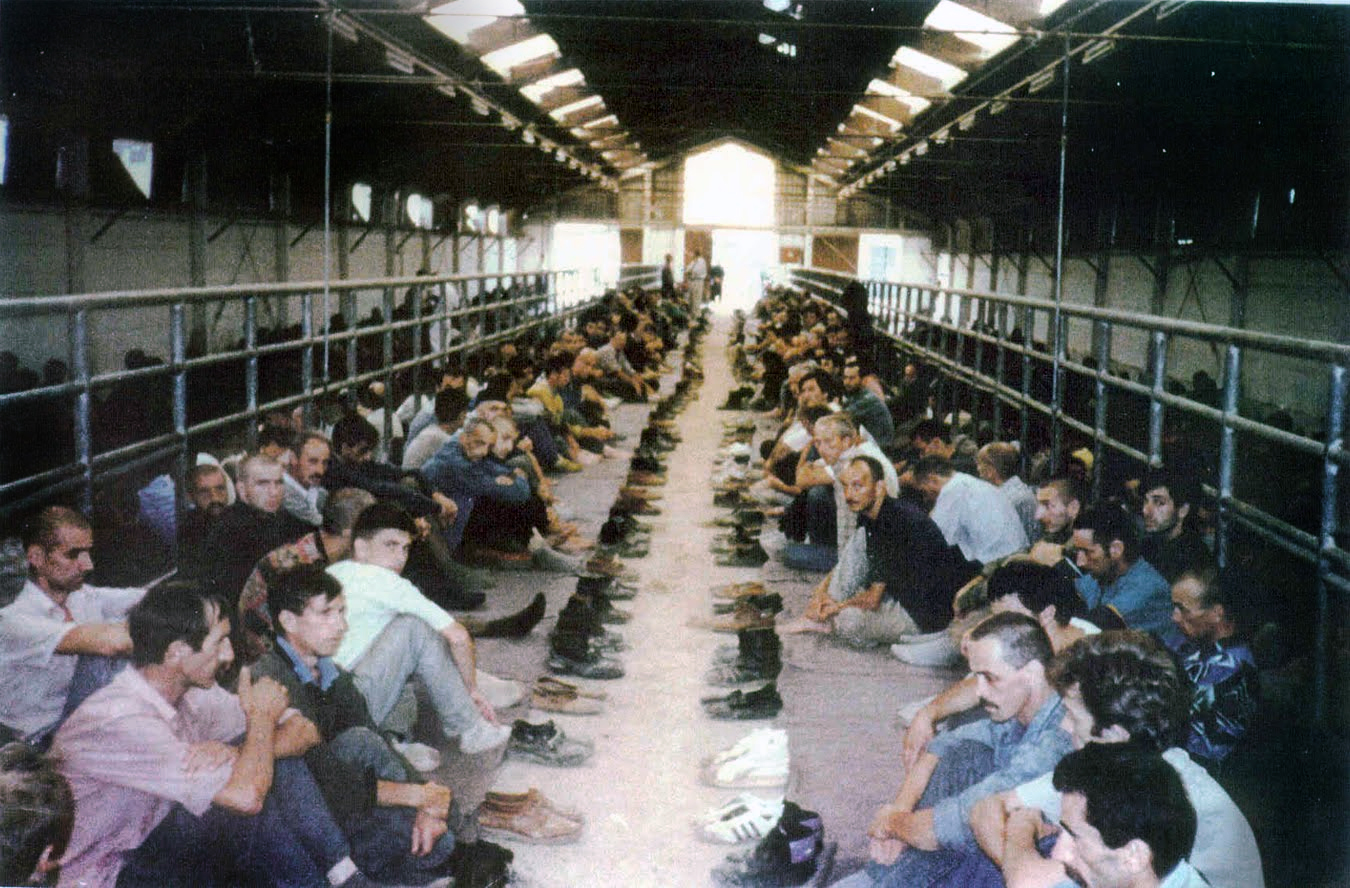
Detainees in the Manjača camp, near Banja Luka, 1992

The initial Constitution of Republika Srpska in Article I.1 declared that it was "the state of the Serb people", without any mention of other ethnic groups living there. Numerous discriminatory measures were introduced against Bosniaks on VRS-held territory. In the town of Prijedor, starting from 30 April 1992, non-Serbs were dismissed from their jobs and banned from entering the court building, and were replaced by Serbs. Bosniak intellectuals and others were deported to the Omarska camp. Bosniak and Croat homes were searched for weapons and were sometimes looted. On 31 May 1992, an order stipulated that non-Serbs have to mark their houses with white flags or sheets, or to wear white armbands outside their homes. Serb forces accompanied non-Serbs wearing white armbands to buses that transported them to camps at Omarska, Trnopolje and Keraterm camp. Movement was restricted through a curfew and checkpoints. Radio broadcasts appealed to Serbs to "lynch" Bosniaks and Croats. Torture and mistreatment in these detention centres were established as to leave inmates with no other choice then to accept the offer of their release under the condition they sign a document that compelled them to leave the area.

In Banja Luka, Bosniaks and Croats were evicted from their homes, and incoming displaced Serbs took their accommodation. Forced labour imposed by the authorities hastened the flight of non-Serbs. Those leaving Banja Luka had to sign documents of abandonment of their properties without compensation. Paramilitaries frequently broke into the homes of non-Serbs at night to rob and assault the occupants. In some instances, paramilitaries would shoot at the houses. The local Serb police did not prevent these sustained assaults. In Zvornik, Bosniaks were given official stamps on identity cards for a change of domicile; to leave the area, they were forced to transfer their properties to an agency for the exchange of houses. Starting from May–June 1992, Bosniaks were taken by bus to Tuzla and Subotica in Serbia. Some residents were ordered to leave at gunpoint. Similar forced removals occurred in Foča, Vlasenica, Brčko, Bosanski Šamac, and other Bosnian towns. In the villages around Vlasenica, the Serb Special Police Platoon was ordered by Miroslav Kraljević that the territory has to be "100 % clean" and that no Bosniak should remain. UNHCR representatives were reluctant to help Bosniaks leave war-affected areas, fearing they would become unwilling accomplices to the ethnic cleansing. Foča was renamed Srbinje (The Place of the Serbs). One Bosniak woman, who was raped, said her rapist told her his aim was to baptise and convert all of them to Serbs.

In Doboj, following its takeover in May 1992, a wave of widespread looting and destruction of the homes of non-Serbs was committed. Hundreds of Bosniaks and numerous Croats were killed during the operation by Bosnian Serb forces.

In Kozluk in June 1992, Bosniaks were rounded up and placed in trucks and trains to remove them from the area. In Bijeljina, non-Serbs were also evicted from their homes and dismissed from their jobs. Arrested non-Serbs were sent to the Batković camp, where they performed forced labor on the front lines. Serb paramilitary singled out Bosniaks and used violence against them. In the Višegrad massacres of 1992, hundreds of Bosniaks were rounded up on a bridge, shot and thrown into the river or locked in houses and burnt alive; Bosniak women were raped and a Bosniak man was tied to a car and dragged around the town. 70% of all expulsions occurred between April and August 1992, when the Serb forces attacked 37 municipalities across Bosnia, reducing the non-Serb population from 726,960 (54%) in 1991 to 235,015 (36%) in 1997. 850 Bosniak and Croat villages were razed to the ground.

The VRS placed Bosniak enclaves under siege. After the VRS takeover of Srebrenica on 11 July 1995, 7,475 Bosniaks were massacred while a further 23,000 people were bused out of the area by 13 July. Overall, the Serb forces killed approximately 50,000 non-Serbs across Bosnia in order to force many others into leaving.

=== Croat forces ===
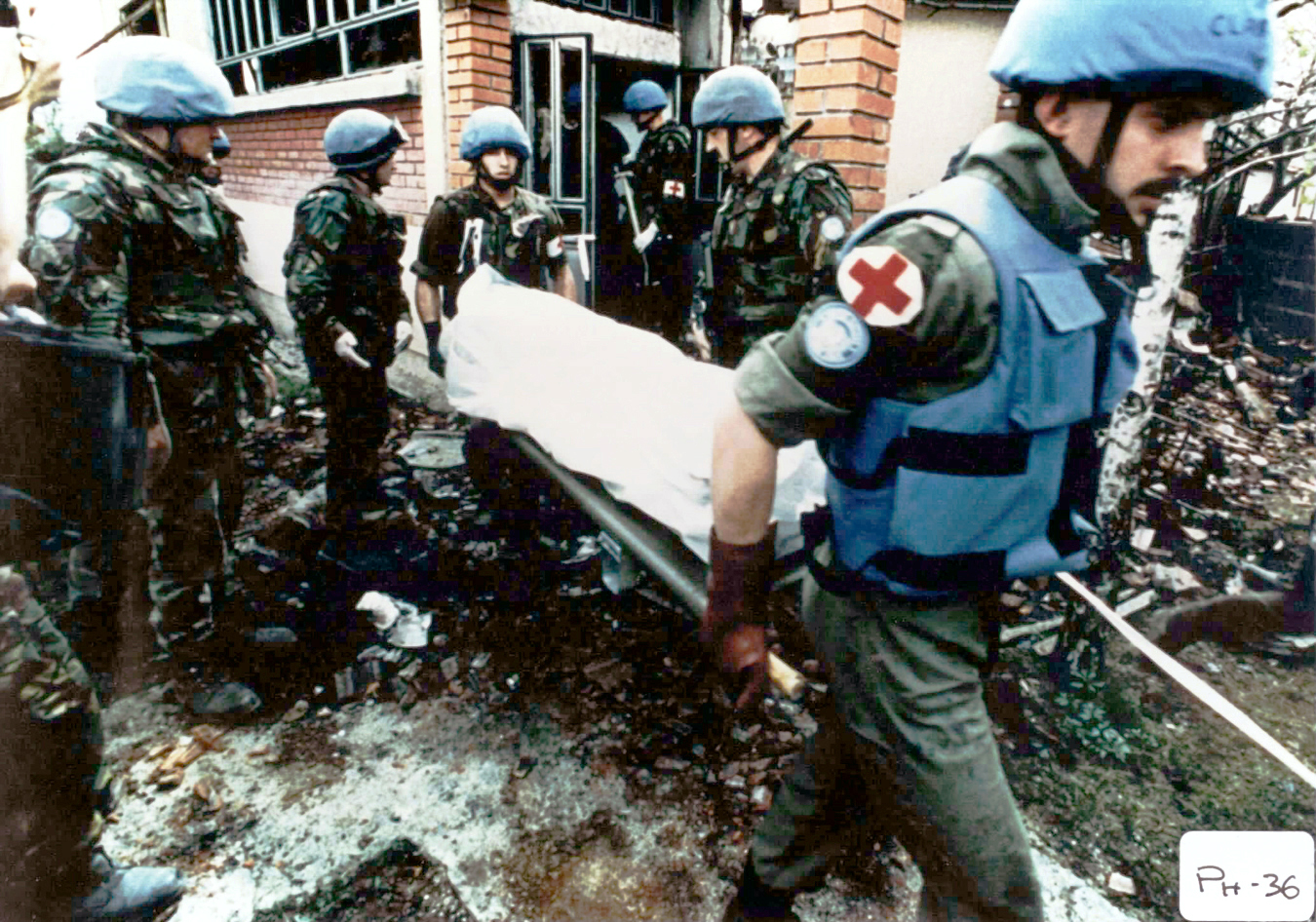
UN Peace keepers collecting bodies from Ahmići in April 1993

In early 1992, as VRS forces were advancing towards Odžak and Bosanska Posavina, Croat forces routed Serb civilians living in the area and transported them to Croatia. They also expelled Serbs from Herzegovina and burned their houses in May 1992. In 1993, the Bosnian Croat authorities used ethnic cleansing in conjunction with the attack on Mostar, where Bosniaks were placed in Croat-run detention camps. Croat forces evicted Bosniaks from the western part of Mostar and from other towns and villages, including Stolac and Čapljina. To assume power in communities in Central Bosnia and Western Herzegovina that were coveted by the HR BH, its president Mate Boban ordered the Croatian Defence Council (HVO) to start persecuting Bosniaks living in these territories. Croat forces used "artillery, eviction, violence, rape, robbery and extortion" to expel or kill the Bosniak population, some of whom were detained in the Heliodrom and Dretelj camps. The Ahmići and Stupni Do massacres had the aim of removing Bosniaks from these areas.

Croat soldiers blew up Bosniak businesses and shops in some towns. They arrested thousands of Bosniak civilians and tried to remove them from Herzegovina by deporting them to third countries. HR HB forces purged Serbs and Bosniaks from government offices and the police. The Bosniaks of HR HB-designated areas were increasingly harassed. In Vitez and Zenica in April 1993, Croat soldiers warned Bosniaks they would be killed in three hours unless they left their homes. 5,000 Bosniaks were expelled from the Vitez region and 20,000–25,000 from the Croat-controlled part of Mostar. Similar events occurred in Prozor, where Bosniaks left after Croat forces took over the city, looting and burning Bosniak shops. In October 1995, Croatian forces led by Damir Krstičević massacred up to 480 Serb civilians and soldiers in Mrkonjić Grad, while also burning numerous villages around the municipalities of Mrkonjić Grad, Šipovo, Bosansko Grahovo, and Drvar as a part of Operation Southern Move. The mass grave was recovered in April 1996 by Serbian forensics.

=== Bosniak forces ===
According to the UN Security Council's "Final Report (1994)", Bosniaks engaged in "grave breaches of the Geneva Conventions and other violations of international humanitarian law" but they did not engage in "systematic ethnic cleansing". However, other sources characterized certain actions by Bosniak forces as ethnic cleansing, including Steven Woehrel of the Congressional Research Service, SRNA (Republika Srpska's Official News Agency),Christianity Today, among others. ARBiH has been confirmed to have targeted civilian population during several of its missions, including the Doboj shelling, the killings of Serbs in Bratunac and Srebrenica, and the Grabovica massacre. Bosnian prosecutors charged former members of the Bosnian Army with crimes against humanity against Serbs, with the aim of expelling them from Konjic and surrounding villages in May 1992. During the 1993 siege of Goražde, Bosniak forces expelled some Serbs from the town and placed others under house arrest. Similar incidents occurred in March 1993 when Bosniak authorities initiated a campaign to expel Croats from Konjic. During the siege of Sarajevo, Bosniak paramilitary leader Mušan Topalović and his forces abducted and killed mostly Serbs living in and around the Sarajevo suburb Bistrik before Bosnian police killed Topalović in October 1993. The departure of Croats from Sarajevo, Tuzla and Zenica had different motives, which were not always the direct consequence of pressure by Bosniaks. According to a commemorative Serb organization, following the Battle of Vozuća, 30 Serbian villages were burned down, and 1,920 families were expelled. For reasons that are not entirely clear, the ECMM monitors in central Bosnia generally favored the Muslims, even to the extent of minimizing Croat charges of "ethnic cleansing" by the Muslims.

== Demographic changes ==
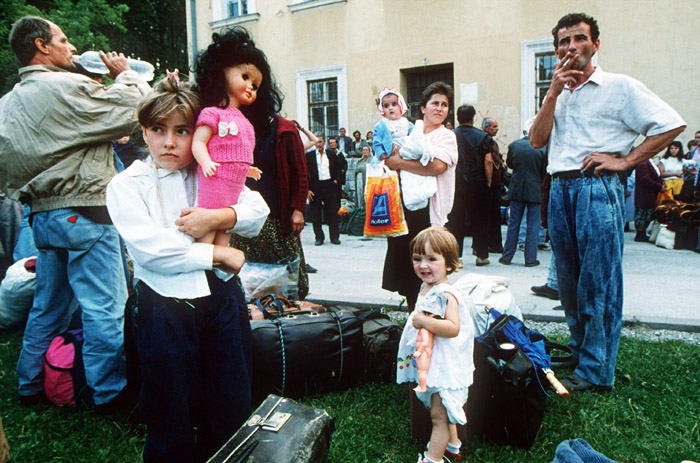
Displaced Bosnians in 1993

According to the 1991 census, Bosnia and Herzegovina had a population of 4,364,574, of whom 43.7% were Bosniaks, 31.4% were Serbs, 17.3% were Croats and 5.5% were Yugoslavs. In 1981, around 16% of the population were of mixed ancestry. Serbs constituted 31% of Bosnia and Herzegovina's populace but Karadžić claimed 70% of the country's territory. The organizers of the ethnic cleansing campaign wanted to replace Bosnia's multiethnic society with a society based on Serb nationalist supremacy, which was seen as a form of Serbianisation of these areas. Indian academic Radha Kumar described such territorial separation of groups based on their nationality as "ethnic apartheid".

It is estimated between 1.0 and 1.3 million people were uprooted and that tens of thousands were killed during the ethnic cleansing. Serb forces perpetrated most of the ethnic cleansing campaigns and the majority of the victims were Bosniaks.

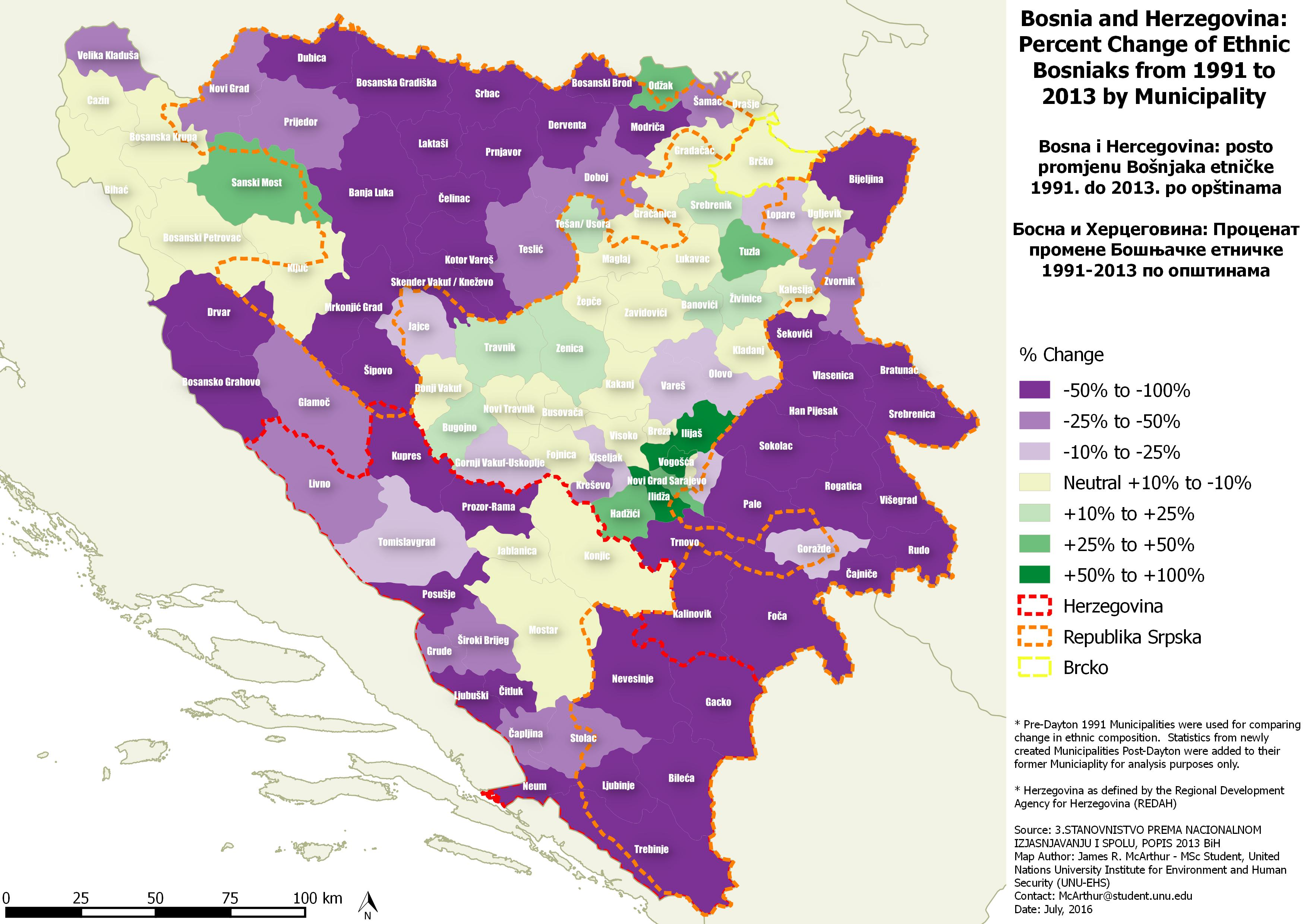
Percentual change of the number of ethnic Bosniaks by Municipality from 1991 to 2013

In September 1994, UNHCR representatives estimated around 80,000 non-Serbs out of 837,000 who initially lived on the Serb-controlled territory of Bosnia and Herzegovina before the war remained there; an estimated removal of 90% of the Bosniak and Croat inhabitants of Serb-controlled territory, almost all of whom were deliberately forced out of their homes. By the end of the war in late 1995, the Bosnian Serb forces had expelled or killed 95% of all non-Serbs living in the territory they annexed. In one municipality, Zvornik, the Bosniak and Croat population dropped from 31,000 in 1991 to less than 1,000 in 1997.

Bosnian professor Murat Prašo analysed the demographic changes in the region from 1991 to 1995 and found that prior to the war, the Bosnian territory held by the Army of the Republika Srpska was 47% Serbs, 33% Bosniaks, and 13% Croats. According to his research, after the war, in 1995, Serbs comprised 89%, Bosniaks 3%, and Croats 1% of the remaining population. In the Bosnian territory held by the HVO and the Croatian Army, before the war, Croats composed 49% of the population; this percentage rose to 96% in 1996. By the same year, the percentage of Bosniaks fell from 22% to 2.5%, and the percentage of Serbs fell from 25% to 0.3%. Before the war, Bosniaks composed 57% of the populace of territory controlled by the ARBiH; at the end of the war, they composed 74%.

1991–1995 demographic changes, based on the pre-Dayton Agreement territorial control, according to Murat Prašo

Territory held by the Army of Republika Srpska
Ethnic group	1991	1995	Change
Bosniaks	551,000 (32.7%)	28,000 (3.1%)	-523,000 (-29.6%)
Croats	209,000 (12.4%)	11,000 (1.2%)	-198,000 (-11.2%)
Serbs	799,000 (47.5%)	806,000 (89.2%)	+7,000 (+41.7%)
Total	1,683,000 (100%)	904,000 (100%)	-779,000

Territory held by the Army of the Republic of Bosnia and Herzegovina
Ethnic group	1991	1995	Change
Bosniaks	1,235,000 (56.9%)	1,238,000 (74.1%)	+3,000 (+17.2%)
Croats	295,000 (13.6%)	150,000 (9.0%)	-145,000 (-4.6%)
Serbs	438,000 (20.2%)	180,000 (10.8%)	-258,000 (-9.4%)
Total	2,170,000 (100%)	1,671,000 (100%)	-499,000

Territory held by the Croatian Defence Council and the Croatian Army
Ethnic group	1991	1995	Change
Bosniaks	117,000 (22.1%)	8,000 (2.5%)	-109,000 (-19.6%)
Croats	259,000 (49.0%)	307,000 (95.6%)	+48,000 (+46.6%)
Serbs	130,000 (24.6%)	1,000 (0.3%)	-129,000 (-24.3%)
Total	529,000 (100%)	321,000 (100%)	-208,000

Croatian historian Saša Mrduljaš analysed demographic changes in relation to territorial control following the Dayton Agreement. According to his research, in Republika Srpska, the number of Bosniaks changed from 473,000 in 1991 to 100,000 in 2011; the number of Croats changed from 151,000 to 15,000; and the number of Serbs changed from 886,000 to 1,220,000. In the territory controlled by the ARBiH, the number of Serbs changed from 400,000 to 50,000, the number of Croats changed from 243,000 to 110,000, and the number of Bosniaks changed from 1,323,000 to 1,550,000. In the HVO-held area, the number of Serbs changed from 80,000 to 20,000, the number of Bosniaks changed from 107,000 to 70,000, and the number of Croats changed from 367,000 in 1991 to 370,000 in 2011.

1991–2011 demographic changes, based on the 1995/1996 territorial control, according to Saša Mrduljaš

Territory held by the Army of Republika Srpska
Ethnic group
Ethnic group	1991	2011	Change in share
Bosniaks	473,000 (28.9%)	100,000 (7.4%)	–21.6%
Croats	151,000 (9.2%)	15,000 (1.1%)	–8.1%
Serbs	886,000 (54.2%)	1,220,000 (90.0%)	+35.8%
Yugoslavs (Note: Identifier Yugoslav(s) has been used both as an ethnic or supra-ethnic/national label and as a demonym for citizens and inhabitants of the former Yugoslavia. Following the breakup of Yugoslavia and the Yugoslav Wars, the vast majority of those who once identified themselves as "Yugoslavs" abandoned the label in favor of traditional ethnic ones or national identities of the successor nations. In some instances, especially in multi-ethnic historical entities, some people chose to use sub-national and regional identifications like Istria–Istrians (see Istrian identity), Vojvodina–Vojvođans.)	82,000 (5.0%)	-	–5.0%
Others	42,000 (2.6%)	25,000 (1.5%)	–1,1%
Total	1,634,000	1,957,000	

Territory held by the Army of the Republic of Bosnia and Herzegovina
Ethnic group
Ethnic group	1991	2011	Change in share
Bosniaks	1,323,000 (61.3%)	1,943,000 (89.1%)	+27.8%
Croats	243,000 (11.3%)	180,000 (6.3%)	–4.9%
Serbs	400,000 (18.5%)	55,000 (2.9%)	–15.6%
Yugoslavs	140,000 (6.5%)	-	–6.5%
Others	54,000 (2.5%)	35,000 (1.7%)	–0.8%
Total	2,160,000	1,745,000	

Territory held by the Croatian Defence Council
Ethnic group
Ethnic group	1991	2011	Change in share
Bosniaks	107,000 (18.3%)	75,000 (14.9%)	–3.4%
Croats	367,000 (62.8%)	370,000 (78.7%)	+15.9%
Serbs	80,000 (13.7%)	20,000 (4.3%)	–9.4%
Yugoslavs	21,000 (3.6%)	-	–3.6%
Others	9,000 (1.5%)	10,000 (2.1%)	+0.6%
Total	584,000	500,000	

Initial estimates placed the number of refugees and internally displaced people during the Bosnian War at 2.7 million, though later publications by the UN cite 2.2 million people who fled or were forced from their homes. It was the largest exodus in Europe since World War II. A million people were internally displaced and 1.2 million people left the country; 685,000 fled to western Europe—330,000 of whom went to Germany—and 446,500 went to other former Yugoslav republics. The Bosnian War ended when the Dayton Agreement was signed on 14 December 1995; it stipulated Bosnia and Herzegovina was to stay a united country shared by Federation of Bosnia and Herzegovina (FBiH) and Republika Srpska, and granted the right of return for victims of ethnic cleansing.

Number of refugees or internally displaced in 1992–1995
Country	Bosniaks	Croats	Serbs
Bosnia and Herzegovina	1,270,000 (63% of the group)	490,000 (67% of the group)	540,000 (39% of the group)

The homogenization of the population continued after the war finished. When the Serb-held areas of Sarajevo were transferred to the FBiH in March 1996, many Serbs left Sarajevo in the ensuing months. Between 60,000 and 90,000 Serbs left Sarajevo's suburbs. This was interpreted as a result of Dayton's division of Bosnia along ethnic lines. The Bosnian Serbs' politicians pressured Serbs into leaving Sarajevo, while the mixed statements of the Bosnian government caused a lack of confidence among Serb inhabitants. Bosnian Serb extremists burned apartments and expelled Serbs who wanted to stay in these suburbs before the handover to the Bosnian government. In Ilidža, medical equipment, machines, and utility equipment disappeared. Serb politician Momčilo Krajišnik publicly called for Serbs to leave Sarajevo, which prompted a UN press officer to call the Serb authorities "the masters of manipulation". This episode is often cited as "difficult to distinguish between coercion and voluntarism".

The demographic changes caused by the conflict in Bosnia and Herzegovina were the most dramatic that the country had experienced in a century; the 2013 population census registered 3,531,159 inhabitants—a more-than-19% decline within a single generation.

== Destruction of religious buildings ==
=== Islamic ===
Destruction of Islamic religious buildings in Bosnia (1992–1995)
	Destroyed by Serbs	Destroyed by Croats	Damaged by Serbs	Damaged by Croats	Total destroyed during the war	Total damaged during the war	Total	Total no. before the war	Percentage of pre-war damaged or destroyed
congregational mosque	249	58	540	80	307	620	927	1,149	81%
small neighbourhood mosque	21	20	175	43	41	218	259	557	47%
Quran schools	14	4	55	14	18	69	87	954	9%
Dervish lodges	4	1	3	1	5	4	9	15	60%
Mausolea, shrines	6	1	34	3	7	37	44	90	49%
Buildings of religious endowments	125	24	345	60	149	405	554	1,425	39%
Total	419	108	1,152	201	527	1,353	1,880	4,190	45%

=== Orthodox ===
Destruction of Orthodox religious buildings in Bosnia (1992–1995)
	Destroyed churches	Damaged churches	Destroyed parish homes	Damaged parish homes
Banja Luka Eparchy	2	3	No data	No data
Bihačko-Petrovac Diocese	26	68	No data	No data
Dabrobosanska Eparchy	23	13	No data	No data
Zahumsko-hercegovačka	36	28	No data	No data
Zvornik-tuzlanska	38	60	No data	No data
Total	125	172	67	64

=== Catholic ===
In 1998, Bosnian bishops reported 269 Catholic churches had been destroyed in the Bosnian War.

Total number of destroyed Catholic religious objects in Bosnia and Herzegovina (1992–1995)
	Destroyed by Muslims	Destroyed by Serbs	Damaged by Muslims	Damaged by Serbs	Total destroyed during the war	Total damaged during the war	Total
churches	8	117	67	120	125	187	312
chapels	19	44	75	89	63	164	227
clergy houses	9	56	40	121	65	161	226
monasteries	0	8	7	15	8	22	30
cemeteries	8	0	61	95	8	156	164
Total	44	225	250	481	269	731	1000

== Destruction of housing units ==
Around 500,000 of the 1,295,000 housing units in Bosnia were either damaged or destroyed; 50% were damaged and 6% destroyed in FBiH while 24% were damaged and 5% destroyed in RS. Some of the destruction was incidental damage from combat but most of the extensive destruction and plunder was part of a deliberate plan of ethnic cleansing that was aimed at preventing expelled people from returning to their homes. Half of the schools and a third of the hospitals in the country were also damaged or destroyed.

== Legal prosecution and war crimes trials ==
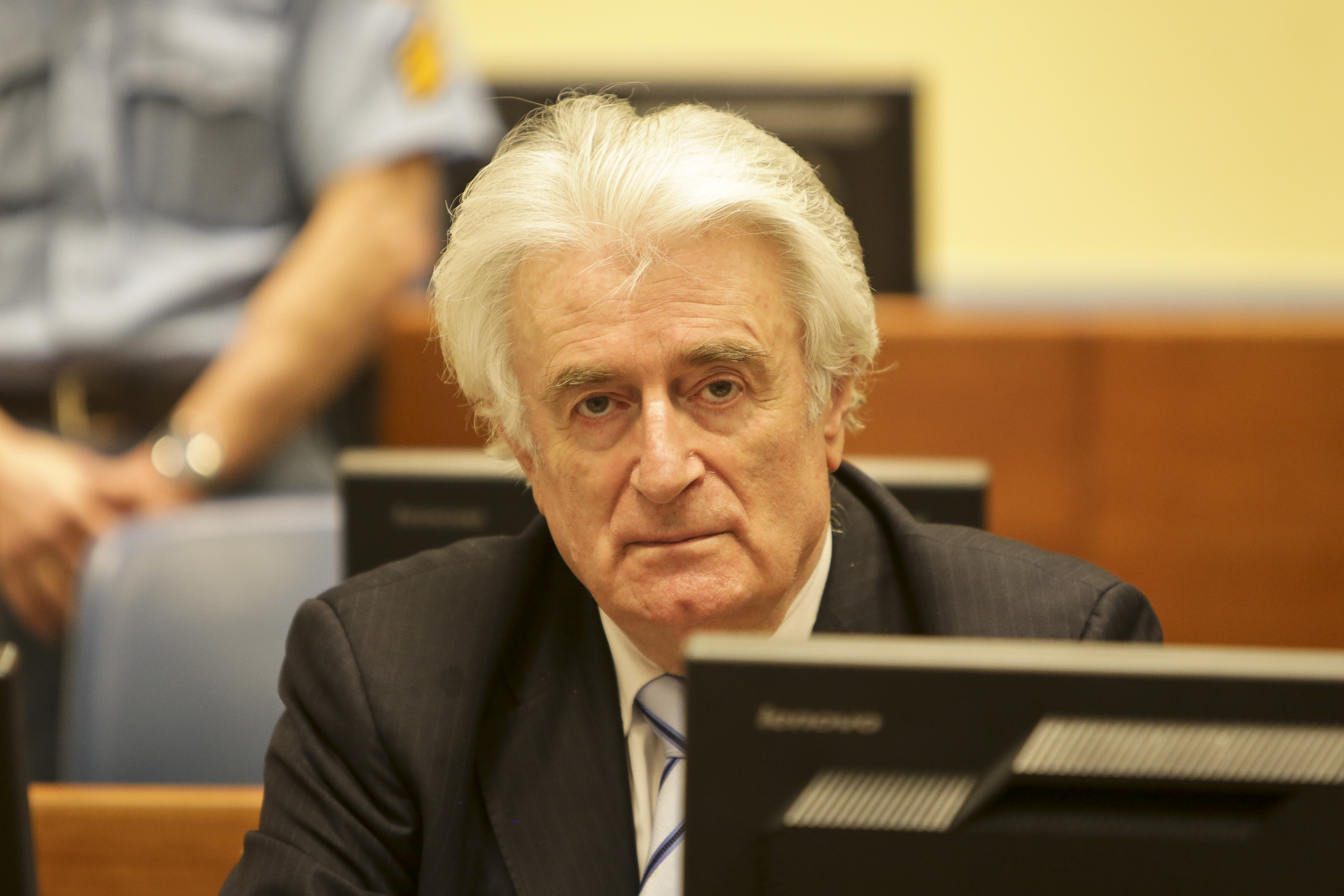
Radovan Karadžić, the president of Republika Srpska, was sentenced for genocide in Bosnia by the ICTY in 2016

Several people were tried and convicted by the UN-backed International Criminal Tribunal for the former Yugoslavia (ICTY) in connection with persecution on racial, religious or ethnic grounds, (Note: The ICTY defined persecution as a discriminatory policy aimed against a particular group by targeting them through "killings, physical and psychological abuse, rape, establishment and perpetuation of inhumane living conditions, forcible transfer or deportation, terrorising and abuse, forced labour at front lines and the use of human shields, plunder of property, wanton destruction of private property, including cultural monuments and sacred sites, and imposition and maintenance of restrictive and discriminatory measures".) forced displacement and deportation as a crime against humanity during the Bosnian War. The Srebrenica massacre, which was also included as part of the ethnic cleansing campaign, was found to constitute a crime of genocide.

Those convicted for taking part in the ethnic cleansing campaigns in Bosnia and Herzegovina include Bosnian Serb politicians, soldiers and officials Momčilo Krajišnik, Radoslav Brđanin, Stojan Župljanin, Mićo Stanišić, Biljana Plavšić, Goran Jelisić, Miroslav Deronjić, Zoran Žigić, Blagoje Simić, Jovica Stanišić, Franko Simatović, Radovan Karadžić and Ratko Mladić. They also include Bosnian Croat officials Mladen Naletilić, Dario Kordić, Slobodan Praljak, Bruno Stojić and Jadranko Prlić.

In its verdict against Karadžić, the ICTY found there was a joint criminal enterprise that aimed to forcibly resettle non-Serbs from large parts of Bosnia, and that it existed from October 1991:

... the Chamber finds that together with the Accused, Krajišnik, Koljević, and Plavšić shared the intent to effect the common plan to permanently remove Bosnian Muslims and Bosnian Croats from Bosnian Serb claimed territory, and through their positions in the Bosnian Serb leadership and involvement throughout the Municipalities, they contributed to the execution of the common plan from October 1991 until at least 30 November 1995.

In the judgement against Bosnian Croat leader Dario Kordić, the ICTY found there was a plan to remove Bosniaks from Croat-claimed territory:

... the Trial Chamber draws the inference from this evidence (and the evidence of other HVO attacks in April 1993) that there was by this time a common design or plan conceived and executed by the Bosnian Croat leadership to ethnically cleanse the Lašva Valley of Muslims. Dario Kordić, as the local political leader, was part of this design or plan, his principal role being that of planner and instigator of it.

== See also ==
- Bosnian genocide
- Bosnian genocide case
- Territorial nationalism

== Bibliography ==
=== Books ===
- Baker, Catherine (2015). The Yugoslav Wars of the 1990s. Basingstoke: Palgrave Macmillan. ISBN 9781137398994. OCLC 910091066.
- Bartrop, Paul R.; Jacobs, Steven Leonard (2014). Modern Genocide: The Definitive Resource and Document Collection. Santa Barbara, CA: ABC-CLIO. ISBN 9781610693646. OCLC 905027982.
- Bartrop, Paul R. (2016). Bosnian Genocide: The Essential Reference Guide: The Essential Reference Guide. Santa Barbara, CA: ABC-CLIO. ISBN 9781440838699. OCLC 900016608.
- Bartrop, Paul R. (2019). Modern Genocide: A Documentary and Reference Guide. Santa Barbara, CA: ABC-CLIO. ISBN 9781440862342.
- Bieber, Florian (2005). Post-War Bosnia: Ethnicity, Inequality and Public Sector Governance. Basingstoke: Palgrave Macmillan. ISBN 9780230501379.
- Bringa, Tone (2005). "Reconciliation in Bosnia-Herzegovina". In Skaar, Elin; Gloppen, Siri; Suhrke, Astri (eds.). Roads to Reconciliation. Lanham, Maryland: Lexington Books. ISBN 9780739109045.
- Burg, Steven; Shoup, Paul (1999). The War in Bosnia-Herzegovina: Ethnic Conflict and International Intervention. Armonk, N.Y.: M.E. Sharpe. p. 171. ISBN 9781563243080. OCLC 78120592.
- Burg, Steven; Shoup, Paul (2015). Ethnic Conflict and International Intervention: Crisis in Bosnia-Herzegovina, 1990-93. New York City: Routledge. ISBN 9781317471028. OCLC 905985217.
- Calic, Marie-Janine (2013). "Ethnic Cleansing and War Crimes, 1991–1995". In Ingrao, Charles W.; Emmert, Thomas Allan (eds.). Confronting the Yugoslav Controversies: a Scholars' Initiative. West Lafayette, Indiana: Purdue University Press. ISBN 9781557536174. OCLC 867740664.
- Call, Charles (2007). Constructing Justice and Security After War. Washington, D.C.: US Institute of Peace Press. ISBN 9781929223909.
- Central Intelligence Agency, Office of Russian and European Analysis (2002). Balkan Battlegrounds: A Military History of the Yugoslav Conflict, 1990–1995, Volume 1. Washington, D.C.: Central Intelligence Agency. ISBN 978-0-16-066472-4.
- Clark, Janine Natalya (2014). International Trials and Reconciliation: Assessing the Impact of the International Criminal Tribunal for the Former Yugoslavia. London: Routledge. ISBN 9781317974758.
- Combs, Nancy Amoury (2007). Guilty Pleas in International Criminal Law: Constructing a Restorative Justice Approach. Redwood City, California: Stanford University Press. ISBN 9780804753524.
- Cousens, Elizabeth M.; Cater, Charles K. (2001). Toward Peace in Bosnia: Implementing the Dayton Accords. Boulder, Colorado: Lynne Rienner Publishers. ISBN 9781555879426.
- Crnobrnja, Mihailo (1996). Yugoslav Drama, Second Edition. Montréal: McGill-Queen's Press. ISBN 9780773566156.
- Crowe, David M. (2013). War Crimes, Genocide, and Justice: A Global History. Basingstoke: Palgrave Macmillan. ISBN 978-0-230-62224-1.
- de Graaff, Bob; Wiebes, Cees (2014). "Fallen Off the Priority List". In Walton, Timothy R. (ed.). The Role of Intelligence in Ending the War in Bosnia in 1995. Lanham, Maryland: Lexington Books. ISBN 9781498500593.
- Donia, Robert J.; Fine, John Van Antwerp (1994). Bosnia and Herzegovina: A Tradition Betrayed. London: C. Hurst & Co. Publishers. ISBN 9781850652120.
- Džankic, Jelena (2016). Citizenship in Bosnia and Herzegovina, Macedonia and Montenegro: Effects of Statehood and Identity Challenges. London, New York City: Routledge. ISBN 9781317165798.
- Eberhardt, Piotr; Owsinski, Jan (2015). Ethnic Groups and Population Changes in Twentieth Century Eastern Europe: History, Data and Analysis. London: Routledge. ISBN 9781317470960.
- Fabijančić, Tony (2010). Bosnia: In the Footsteps of Gavrilo Princip. Edmonton: University of Alberta. ISBN 9780888645197.
- Farkas, Evelyn (2003). Fractured States and U.S. Foreign Policy: Iraq, Ethiopia, and Bosnia in the 1990s. New York City: Palgrave Macmillan. ISBN 9781403982438.
- Fischer, Ernest W. (2019). "The Yugoslav Civil War". In Haglund, David G. (ed.). Nato's Eastern Dilemmas. London: Routledge. ISBN 9780429710780.
- Friedman, Francine (2013). Bosnia and Herzegovina: A Polity on the Brink. London: Routledge. ISBN 9781134527540.
- Hodge, Carole (2019). The Balkans on Trial: Justice vs. Realpolitik. London: Routledge. ISBN 9781000007121.
- Keil, Soeren (2016). Multinational Federalism in Bosnia and Herzegovina. London: Routledge. ISBN 9781317093428.
- Kumar, Radha (1999). Divide and Fall?: Bosnia in the Annals of Partition. London; New York City: Verso. ISBN 9781859841839.
- Lawson, Kenneth E. (2006). Faith and hope in a war-torn land: The US Army chaplaincy in the Balkans, 1995-2005. Washington, D.C.: Government Printing Office. ISBN 9780160872792.
- Lukic, Reneo; Lynch, Allen (1996). Europe from the Balkans to the Urals: The Disintegration of Yugoslavia and the Soviet Union. Oxford: Oxford University Press. ISBN 9780198292005.
- McEvoy, Joanne; O'Leary, Brendan (22 April 2013). Power Sharing in Deeply Divided Places. Philadelphia: University of Pennsylvania Press. ISBN 978-0-8122-0798-9.
- McEvoy, Joanne (2015). Power-Sharing Executives: Governing in Bosnia, Macedonia, and Northern Ireland. Philadelphia: University of Pennsylvania Press. ISBN 9780812246513.
- Mojzes, Paul (2011). Balkan Genocides: Holocaust and Ethnic Cleansing in the Twentieth Century. Lanham, Maryland: Rowman & Littlefield. ISBN 9781442206656. OCLC 785575178.
- Morrison, Kenneth (2016). Sarajevo's Holiday Inn on the Frontline of Politics and War. London: Palgrave Macmillan. ISBN 9781137577184.
- Nettelfield, Lara J. (2010). Courting Democracy in Bosnia and Herzegovina. Cambridge: Cambridge University Press. ISBN 9780521763806. OCLC 793459206.
- Nizich, Ivana (1992). War Crimes in Bosnia-Hercegovina, Volume 1. New York City: Helsinki Watch. ISBN 9781564320834.
- Perica, Vjekoslav (2002). Balkan Idols: Religion and Nationalism in Yugoslav States. Oxford University Press. ISBN 9780195174298.
- Petrovic, Jadranka (2012). The Old Bridge of Mostar and Increasing Respect for Cultural Property in Armed Conflict. Leiden, Boston: Martinus Nijhoff Publishers. ISBN 9789004235540.
- Phillips, R. Cody (2005). Bosnia-Herzegovina. Government Printing Office. ISBN 9780160876141. OCLC 690026854.
- Ramet, Sabrina P. (2010). "Politics in Croatia since 1990". In Ramet, Sabrina P. (ed.). Central and Southeast European Politics Since 1989. Cambridge: Cambridge University Press. pp. 258–285. ISBN 978-1-139-48750-4.
- Riedlmayer, Andras (2002). "From the Ashes: The Past and Future of Bosnia's Cultural Heritage". In Shatzmiller, Maya (ed.). Islam and Bosnia: Conflict Resolution and Foreign Policy in Multi-Ethnic States. Montréal: McGill-Queen's Press. ISBN 9780773523463.
- Rieff, David (1996). Slaughterhouse: Bosnia and the Failure of the West. New York City: Simon and Schuster. ISBN 9780684819037.
- Rogel, Carole (1998). The Breakup of Yugoslavia and the War in Bosnia. Westport, Connecticut: Greenwood Publishing Group. ISBN 9780313299186.
- Schabas, William A. (2000). Genocide in International Law: The Crimes of Crimes. Cambridge: Cambridge University Press. ISBN 9780521787901.
- Schwai, Markus; Burazor, Mladen (2020). "Contemporary Design Intervention Inside the Cultural Landscape of Žepče – At What Price?". In Bailey, Greg; Defilippis, Francesco; Korjenic, Azra; Čaušević, Amir (eds.). Cities and Cultural Landscapes: Recognition, Celebration, Preservation and Experience. Cambridge Scholars Publishing. ISBN 9781527548206.
- Seybolt, Taylor B. (2007). Humanitarian Military Intervention: The Conditions for Success and Failure. Oxford University Press. ISBN 9780199252435.
- Shrader, Charles R. (2003). The Muslim-Croat Civil War in Central Bosnia: A Military History, 1992–1994. College Station, Texas: Texas A&M University Press. ISBN 978-1-58544-261-4.
- Stojarova, Vera (2019). "Characteristics of the Balkans: 1989–2019 in South East Europe: Dancing in a Vicious Circle?". In Eibl, Otto; Gregor, Miloš (eds.). Thirty Years of Political Campaigning in Central and Eastern Europe. Basingstoke: Palgrave Macmillan. ISBN 9783030276935.
- Takeyh, Ray; Gvosdev, Nikolas K. (2004). The Receding Shadow of the Prophet: The Rise and Fall of Radical Political Islam. Greenwood Publishing Group. ISBN 9780275976286.
- Thompson, Wayne C. (2014). Nordic, Central, and Southeastern Europe. Lanham, Maryland: Rowman & Littlefield. ISBN 9781475812244. OCLC 1346950634.
- Toal, Gerard; Tuathail, Gearóid Ó; Dahlman, Carl T. (2011). Bosnia Remade: Ethnic Cleansing and Its Reversal. Oxford: Oxford University Press. ISBN 9780199730360. OCLC 574924211.
- Totten, Samuel (2017). Genocide at the Millennium. London: Routledge. ISBN 9781351517836.
- Vermeulen, Hans; Govers, Cora (1994). "Full text for reading and/or download available at academia.edu". The Anthropology of Ethnicity: Beyond "Ethnic Groups and Boundaries". Het Spinhuis. ISBN 9789073052970.
- Wheeler, Nicholas J. (2002). "Human rights and security agenda: beyond non-intervention?". In Rees, G. Wyn (ed.). International Politics in Europe: The New Agenda. London: Routledge. ISBN 9781134890163.

=== Scientific journals ===
- Ali, Rabia; Lifschultz, Lawrence (1994). "Why Bosnia?". Third World Quarterly. 15 (3): 367–401. doi:10.1080/01436599408420387. JSTOR 3993291.
- Balić, Smail (1997). "The Cultural Achievements of Bosnian Muslims". Islamic Studies. 36 (2): 137–175. JSTOR 23076192.
- Bell-Fialkoff, Andrew (1993). "A Brief History of Ethnic Cleansing". Foreign Affairs. 72 (3): 110–121. doi:10.2307/20045626. JSTOR 20045626. S2CID 27821821.
- Brunborg, Helge; Lyngstad, Torkild Hovde; Urdal, Henrik (2003). "Accounting for Genocide: How Many Were Killed in Srebrenica?". European Journal of Population. 19 (3): 229–248. doi:10.1023/A:1024949307841. JSTOR 20164231. S2CID 150727427.
- Burg, Steven (1986). "Elite conflict in post-Tito Yugoslavia". Soviet Studies. 38 (2): 170–193. doi:10.1080/09668138608411634.
- Haddad, Heidi Nichols (2011). "Mobilizing the Will to Prosecute: Crimes of Rape at the Yugoslav and Rwandan Tribunals". Human Rights Review. 12: 109–132. doi:10.1007/s12142-010-0163-x. S2CID 55172255.
- Katz, Vera (2014). "A Platform on the Future Yugoslav Community (Izetbegovic-Gligorov Plan). A View from the Perspective of Bosnia and Herzegovina". Politeja. 4 (30): 191–210. doi:10.12797/Politeja.11.2014.30.18. JSTOR 24919725.
- Kelly, Michael J. (2002). "Can Sovereigns Be Brought to Justice? The Crime of Genocide's Evolution and the Meaning of the Milosevic Trial". St. John's Law Review. 76 (2): 287–378. SSRN 920900.
- Kondylis, Florence (2008). "Conflict displacement and labor market outcomes in post-war Bosnia and Herzegovina" (PDF). Journal of Development Economics. 93 (2): 235–248. doi:10.1016/j.jdeveco.2009.10.004.
- Mrduljaš, Saša (2011). "Značenje političkih odnosa u Bosni i Hercegovini za Dalmaciju" [Relevance of the political relations in Bosnia and Herzegovina to Dalmatia]. New Presence: Review for Intellectual and Spiritual Questions (in Croatian). 9 (3). Institute of Social Sciences Ivo Pilar: 521–544.
- Ringdal, Gerd Inger; Ringdal, Kristen; Simkus, Albert (2008). "War Experiences and War-related Distress in Bosnia and Herzegovina Eight Years after War". Croatian Medical Journal. 49 (1): 75–86. doi:10.3325/cmj.2008.1.75. PMC 2269254. PMID 18293460.
- Tuathail, Gearóid Ó.; O'Loughlin, John (2009). "After Ethnic Cleansing: Return Outcomes in Bosnia-Herzegovina a Decade Beyond War". Annals of the Association of American Geographers. 99 (5): 1045–1053. doi:10.1080/00045600903260671. S2CID 143472185.
- Young, Kirsten (2001). "UNHCR and ICRC in the former Yugoslavia: Bosnia-Herzegovina" (PDF). International Review of the Red Cross. 83 (843): 781–806. doi:10.1017/S1560775500119315. S2CID 37791908.

=== Other sources ===
- Amnesty International (1992). "Bosnia-Herzegovina: Gross Abuses of Basic Human Rights". New York. OCLC 231617610.
- Bassiouni, M. Cherif (28 December 1994). "Final report of the United Nations Commission of Experts established pursuant to security council resolution 780 (1992), Annex IV – The policy of ethnic cleansing". United Nations. Archived from the original on 4 May 2012.
- International Court of Justice (2007). "Case Concerning Application of the Convention on the Prevention and Punishment of the Crime of Genocide (Bosnia and Herzegovina vs, Serbia and Montenegro)" (PDF). The Hague.
- "Prosecutor vs. Zejnil Delalić – Judgement" (PDF). The Hague: International Criminal Tribunal for the Former Yugoslavia. 16 November 1998.
- "Prosecutor vs. Radovan Karadžić – Judgement" (PDF). The Hague: International Criminal Tribunal for the Former Yugoslavia. 26 March 2016.
- "Prosecutor v. Dario Kordić and Mario Čerkez – Judgement" (PDF). The Hague: International Criminal Tribunal for the Former Yugoslavia. 26 February 2001.
- Mazowiecki, Tadeusz (17 November 1992). "Situation of human rights in the territory of the former Yugoslavia: note / by the Secretary-General". United Nations Commission on Human Rights.
- "Report of the Secretary-General pursuant to General Assembly resolution 53/35: The fall of Srebrenica [A/54/549]". United Nations. 15 November 1999.
