= On Day One =

On Day One is an educational campaign designed to enhance understanding among the American public and alert candidates for office of the need and potential for international cooperation in addressing key global challenges.

== Affiliation ==
On Day One is a project within the Better World Campaign (BWC), a nonpartisan organization that works to strengthen the relationship between the United States and the United Nations through outreach, communications, and advocacy. BWC was started by the Better World Fund which together with the United Nations Foundation, is a product of entrepreneur and philanthropist Ted Turner’s historic $1 billion gift to support UN causes.

== How it works ==
Using an online media platform, On Day One is designed to gather and share ideas about what the next president can do on the first day of his or her administration to help address the world's most pressing challenges. From climate change, terrorism, poverty to the spread of disease, On Day One encourages regular citizens to be part of a global conversation about how international cooperation can be harnesses to address the world's most critical dilemmas. On Day One contributors have included:

- Nobel Peace Prize Winner Muhammad Yunus
- Ambassador Joseph Wilson
- Former EPA Administrator Carol Browner
- Washington Note Columnist Steve Clemons
- Former White House Chief of Staff John Podesta
- Former Senator and Presidential Candidate Mike Gravel
- Former State Department Chief of Staff Col. Lawrence Wilkerson
- Ambassador Thomas Pickering
- Congresswoman Barbara Lee
