= United Nations U.S. Council of Organizations =

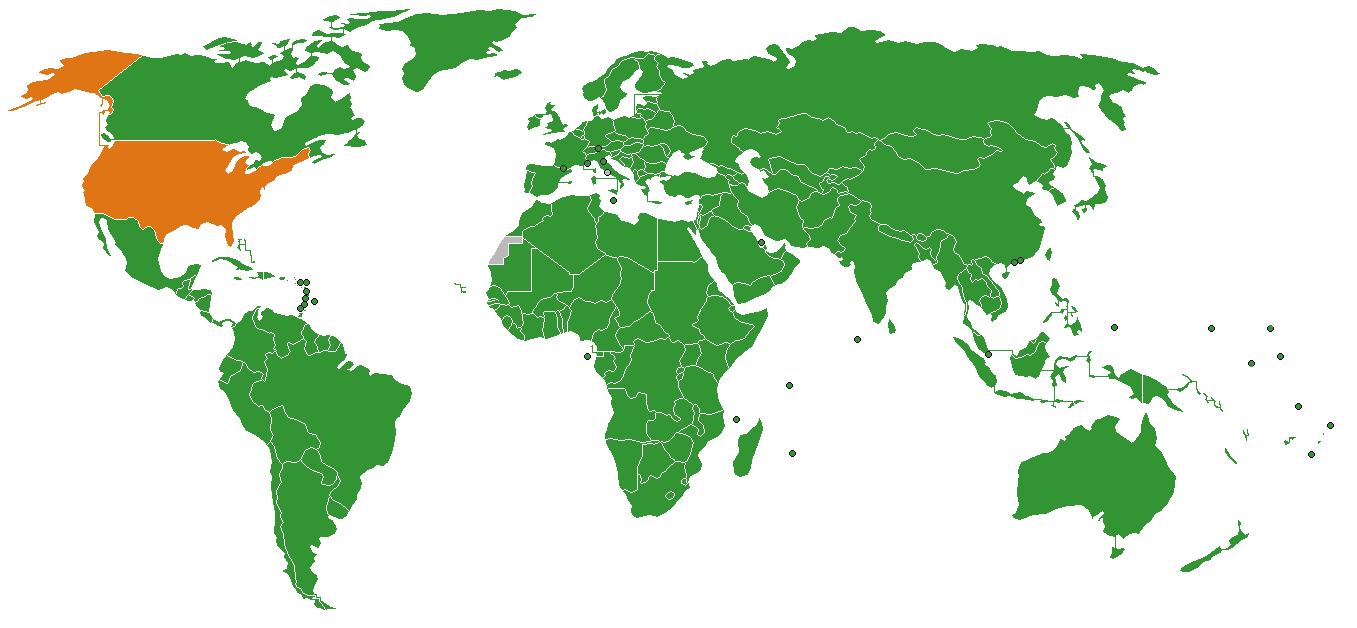
Location of United States

The United Nations United States Council of Organizations, or Council of Organizations is a body dedicated to supporting the United Nations. The council is closely affiliated with the United Nations Association of the United States of America, the United Nations Foundation, and the UNA-USA National Council.

== History ==
Established in 1947, the council advocates for US leadership at the UN, connects the mission and work of the UN to schools and communities across the US, and works with a wide range of partners to advance the UN's Sustainable Development Goals. The committee is composed of representatives from across the United States representing educational, nonprofit, business, and civic organizations.

== See also ==
- United Nations Foundation
- United Nations
