= Robert T. Hoshibata =

- Denomination: The United Methodist Church

Current posting
- Judicatory: Phoenix Area, Desert Southwest Conference
- Title: Bishop
- Period in office: 2012–present
- Consecration: July 17, 2004
- Predecessor: Minerva G. Carcaño

Religious career
- Ordination as Elder: 1979
- Previous Episcopal Office: Oregon-Idaho Conference (2004–2012)
- Previous post: District Superintendent, Seattle District

Personal
- Date of birth: October 11, 1951 (age 74)
- Place of birth: Honolulu, HI, United States

Robert Tsugio Hoshibata (born 11 October 1951) is a bishop of The United Methodist Church (UMC), the second-largest Protestant denomination in the United States. He was elected to the episcopacy in 2004. His first assignment was as Bishop of the Oregon-Idaho Conference of the UMC. He currently serves as Bishop of the Phoenix Episcopal Area, Desert Southwest Conference for the UMC.

== Birth and family ==
Hoshibata was born 11 October 1951 in Honolulu, Hawaii and raised in Wahiawa, Hawaii. He married Greta Goo on 10 August 1974. They have three children: Courtney, Lauren and Blake.

== Education ==
Hoshibata earned a B.A. degree in 1973 from Wesleyan University, Middletown, Connecticut, graduating with high honors. He was a Crusade Scholar (1974–77) while pursuing his D.Min. degree from Claremont School of Theology, graduating in 1977. He also completed post-graduate study at the Pacific School of Religion (1979) and the Vancouver School of Theology (1984).

== Ordained ministry ==
Hoshibata's first position was as the youth minister of the First Congregational Church of Portland, Connecticut (1970–71). He then served as a ministerial intern at Kahalu'u U.M.C., Parker U.M.C. and Palolo U.M.C. in Hawaii (1974–75). He was the Youth Minister of the North Gardena U.M.C. in Gardena, California, (1973–74, 1975–77), then appointed as senior pastor of the same congregation (1977–84). He served 1984-98 as senior pastor of Blaine Memorial U.M.C., Seattle, Washington. He was appointed superintendent of the Seattle District of the U.M.C., a position he held until elected to the episcopacy. Dr. Hoshibata also served as Co-superintendent of the Tacoma District. He served as the Dean of the Cabinet of the Pacific Northwest Annual Conference (2002–04).

== Episcopal election and service ==
Bishop Hoshibata was the first of two Bishops elected in 2004 in the Western Jurisdictional Conference of the U.M. Church, meeting in San Jose, California. He was assigned to the Portland Episcopal Area (the Oregon-Idaho Annual Conference), from 2004 through 2012. In 2012, he began his episcopal service to the Phoenix Area (Desert Southwest Conference).

== Advocacy ==
In early 2011, he endorsed a call by a group of retired bishops for ending the United Methodist Church’s ban on homosexual clergy:

… in the context where I am doing ministry, there are many persons that I know – gay and lesbian and transgender – who are good people, good Christians, who the church is neglecting or turning away from.

In December 2012, Bishop Hoshibata visited over a dozen offices in the United States Senate and House of Representatives in Washington, D.C., in support of The Global Fund to Fight AIDS, Tuberculosis and Malaria and as part of the UMC's Imagine No Malaria campaign.

In May 2013, Bishop Hoshibata was also signatory to a letter advocating immigration reform to Arizona's Senators.

== Writings ==
- — (1977). The Sermon on the Mount in Calligraphy: Calligraphy as a Tool in Church Ministry (Thesis). Claremont, CA: Claremont School of Theology. OCLC 10281734.

== See also ==
- List of bishops of the United Methodist Church
