= Girl Up =

Girl Up may refer to:

- Girl Up, a campaign launched by the United Nations Foundation in 2010
- "Girl Up", a 2013 charity single by Victoria Justice launched for the Girl Up campaign
