= Athletes for Hope =

Athletes for Hope is a nonprofit organization that works to educate professional athletes about philanthropy, connect them with charitable causes, recognize these efforts and inspire others to get involved in the community. AFH emphasizes that its focus is on the athlete's time and not their money.

Athletes for Hope has grown from its original Founders to over 10,000 athletes across many sports leagues, including the WNBA, NBA, NFL, NHL, NASCAR, MLB, MLS, USATF, and the Olympic movement. These athletes take part in their Causeway program, which provides education workshops and subsequently one-on-one guidance for each athlete through their personal philanthropic journey.

Athletes for Hope has worked with hundreds of professional and Olympic athletes in helping them connect with a variety of charities. As part of this connection program, Athletes for Hope hosts several campaigns throughout the year, such as the Athletes for Active Schools week where athletes participate in school visits throughout the country to promote healthy eating and activity through the Let's Move Active Schools program. In honor of the anniversary of September 11, Athletes for Hope coordinated a visit for Cleveland Cavaliers star Kyrie Irving to visit underserved children at the Beech Brook home in Cleveland, Ohio. Additionally, AFH has worked closely with former US Women's National Team star, Abby Wambach, to promote the anti-malaria efforts of the charity Nothing But Nets.

In 2021, Athletes for Hope created the Whole Being Athlete, a program that unites and empowers athletes of all levels and backgrounds to work together and reduce the stigma of mental health in and out of sports through three main pillars focused upon storytelling, education, and advocacy. Athletes for Hope has now led several national athlete mental health initiatives, and recently partnered with WETA to co-produce the Out of the Dark athlete mental health docuseries, which will be publicly released in the fall of 2024.

In 2024, Athletes for Hope launched the Athlete Leadership Council featuring Stephen Curry, Katie Ledecky, Nathan Chen, Gabby Thomas,Elena Delle Donne, Ezra Frech, Max Holloway, and Jalen Hurts to carry on the AFH Founders' legacies to the next generation.

According to their annual impact report, from 2023 to 2024 Athletes for Hope helped educate over 833 athletes in philanthropy and impacted over 200,000 children per month through their programming.

== Mission ==
Advocacy Efforts: AFH, through a partnership with the Gates Foundation, works to connect athletes to global causes such as ending childhood malnutrition through 1000 Days and the eradication of malaria through Nothing but Nets. In 2016, 100 AFH athletes signed on to the 1,000 Days #FairStart Campaign to advocate for improved maternal and childhood nutrition. This public health campaign is targeting Olympic athletes gearing up for the 2016 Rio Summer Olympics to raise awareness of the global issue of malnutrition.

Athletes for Hope frequently conducts workshops with groups of professional and Olympic athletes. AFH has facilitated workshops for NBA and NFL rookies, the WNBA, USA Track & Field, Real Salt Lake, the WTA Tour, and numerous other groups of professional and Olympic athletes.

Athletes for Hope University The AFH University (AFH U) program began in 2013 and has facilitated workshops for varsity sports teams at Howard University, Georgetown University, Bowie State University, Clark Atlanta University, Morehouse College, Ohio State University, Davidson College, University of Virginia, LSU, Southern University, Tulane University, Michigan State and University of Southern California. Thousands of college athletes have participated in AFH U workshops and scores of teams have given back throughout the school year with the help of AFH.

== Awards and Grants ==
AFH was honored to be chosen as the Let's Move! Active Schools Partner of the Year in May 2016. AFH board chair, Mark Levinstein, accepted the award at the Partnership for a Healthier America's Building a Healthier Future Summit with First Lady Michelle Obama and other distinguished guests. AFH engaged athletes in LMAS initiatives throughout the year and connected AFH athletes to activities related to health, physical fitness, and positive youth development.

In 2010, Athletes for Hope was awarded a $2 million grant by the Kellogg Foundation. This grant will be used to fund two new programs: Causeway and Good Game. Causeway will educate professional and Olympic athletes as well as their advisors on philanthropic best practices and will serve as a resource throughout the athlete's philanthropic journey. Causeway will also provide alternatives to forming a foundation and will teach best practices to athletes with established foundations.

Athletes for Hope received a grant from the Bill & Melinda Gates Foundation. Athletes for Hope received funding for AFH U from Nike. Athletes for Hope received funding for AFH U from the Pennington Foundation.

== Leadership ==
Athletes for Hope is led by CEO Jason Belinkie, who has worked at AFH since its inception. In addition to his work at AFH, Jason was named a Finalist for the 2016 Brooks Inspiring Coach of the Year Award for his work as the cross country and track & field coach for Charles E. Smith Country Day School, where he has led the boys and girls cross country teams to 8 Maryland private school state championships. He is a 2016 recipient of the President's Council on Fitness, Sports & Nutrition (President's Council) Community Leadership Award. This award is given to individuals that provide opportunities to engage in sports, physical activity, fitness, or nutrition-related programs within a community.

AFH was previously led by Ivan Blumberg, a former sports agent who represented many athletes including Jimmy Connors, Pete Sampras, Stefan Edberg, Arthur Ashe and Yannick Noah. Ivan created and formed the curriculum in the Causeway and has been an integral part of the organization's success since its inception.

Board members include: Steve Miller, Agassi Graf Holdings; Rachel Godino, Former Chair of The US Olympic Athletes Advisory Council; Michael Lynch, Head of North American Consulting at Repucom; Mark Levinstein, Williams & Connolly LLP; Julie Foudy, ABC/ESPN; John Langel, Ballard Spahr; Greg Taylor, National Basketball Association; Gordon Gund, Gund Investment Corporation; Gabe Feldman, Tulane University; Frank Marshall, The Kennedy/Marshall Company; Doug Ulman, Pelotonia; Don Fehr, National Hockey League Players Association; Dan Levy, Wasserman Media Group; Allen Furst, Agency21Consulting; Bill Stapleton, Capitol Sports and Entertainment, Inc.; Russ Granik, Galatioto Sports Partners; Richard Elder, Mckinsey & Company; Peter Roby, Northeastern University.

== History ==
Athletes for Hope was founded in 2007 by Muhammad Ali, Andre Agassi, Lance Armstrong, Warrick Dunn, Jeff Gordon, Mia Hamm, Tony Hawk, Andrea Jaeger, Jackie Joyner-Kersee, Mario Lemieux, Alonzo Mourning, and Cal Ripken Jr. All of the founding athletes had already established their own foundations and created Athletes for Hope to support athletes who share their desire to help others.

On April 25, 2007, the founding athletes launched Athletes for Hope on Good Morning America.
