= Measles & Rubella Initiative =

International public health initiative to combat measles and rubella

The Measles & Rubella Initiative (MRI), launched in 2001, is a long-term commitment and partnership among leaders in public health and supports the goal of reducing measles deaths globally by 90% by 2010 compared to 2000 estimates.

== Impact ==
Largely due to the technical and financial support of the Measles Initiative and the commitment from African governments, 217 million children have been vaccinated against measles and 1.2 million lives have been saved since 1999. Building on this achievement, in 2005, the Initiative has expanded its technical and financial support to countries in Asia, where total measles deaths are highest outside of sub-Saharan Africa. Since 2001, the Measles Initiative has mobilized more than $200 million and supported more than 40 African countries and three Asian countries in implementing high-quality measles vaccination campaigns. As a result, global measles deaths have dropped by 48% from 871,000 in 1999 to an estimated 454,000 in 2004 thanks to improvements in routine and supplementary immunization activities. The largest reduction occurred in Africa, the region with the highest burden of the disease, where estimated measles cases and deaths dropped by 60%.

== Structure ==
The mechanism for the Initiative is an American Red Cross-led partnership with operational support to measles burdened countries. The Initiative has adopted the highly successful Rotary-led global polio eradication initiative as a model. Rotary's strategy was two-fold: repeated vaccination campaigns reinforced by routine vaccination. The Initiative employs a similar approach - initial mass catch-up campaigns to vaccinate every child who may be at risk with follow-up campaigns three to four years later to vaccinate children who have been born since the catch-up campaign.

== Background ==
In February 2001, American Red Cross convened a meeting with other global healthcare organizations. American Red Cross, CDC, UNICEF, UN Foundation, and WHO met to discuss the growing problem of measles in Africa. The organizations decided that the problem needed immediate action, especially considering that death from measles is preventable. In the battle to reduce mortality from measles, partnership is crucial because each player brings a different strength and talent to bear. WHO designs the policies and health guidelines for each country to ensure proper, safe steps are taken during immunization campaigns. UNICEF is the only organization allowed to import the vaccine into most developing countries and has a sophisticated logistics capacity as well as great stature in the country. CDC provides funding and the technical and scientific basis for the policies and advises countries on program planning. The UN Foundation provides a substantial amount of funding as well as the financial mechanisms necessary to move funds between agencies and to countries. American Red Cross provides funding and has the network of Red Cross societies around the world and the volunteers to do social mobilization, ensuring each child has a chance to be vaccinated.

== Partners ==
The partners of Measles Initiative are:

- American Red Cross
- International Federation of Red Cross and Red Crescent
- United Nations Foundation
- Centers for Disease Control and Prevention (CDC)
- World Health Organization (WHO)
- United Nations Children's Fund (UNICEF)

These organization endorsed a joint declaration on January 31, 2001 declaring their intent to fight measles in Africa.
