= Frannie Léautier =

Tanzanian civil engineer, academic, business person

- Born: Moshi, Tanzania
- Education: University of Dar es Salaam (BSc in Civil Engineering); Massachusetts Institute of Technology (MSc in Transportation) (PhD in Civil Engineering)
- Occupations: Civil engineer, international development finance and banking executive, and independent board member
- Years active: 1994–present
- Title: Senior partner, SouthBridge Group

Frannie Léautier is a Tanzanian civil engineer, academic, and international finance and development consultant. She leads and helps organizations in the private, public, and not-for-profit spheres thrive in advanced and emerging economies.

== Early life ==
Léautier was born in the northern Tanzanian town of Moshi, in the Kilimanjaro Region. She has three sisters and three brothers. At age three, her family relocated to Lushoto, a town in the Usambara Mountains. Growing up there, she was influenced by her grandfather, who inspired her to study physics and engineering.

Léautier was admitted to the University of Dar es Salaam, graduating in 1984 with a Bachelor of Science (B.Sc.) in Civil Engineering. She continued her studies at the Massachusetts Institute of Technology (MIT), where she earned a Master of Science (M.Sc.) in Transportation, graduating in 1986. She followed that up with a Doctor of Philosophy (Ph.D.) in Civil Engineering, from 1987 to graduation in 1990.

== Career ==
Léautier engaged with the World Bank in 1992 on the strategy for infrastructure in the 1990s. She joined the organization full-time in 1994, working in Washington, DC, for the next 15 years. She worked in various roles, including as director of infrastructure for a year in 2000. For the next 12 months, in 2001, she served as the chief of staff to the president of the World Bank Group, at that time James Wolfensohn. For the last six years of her tenure at the World Bank, from 2001 to 2007, she was in charge of the World Bank Institute.

After she left the World Bank, Léautier co-founded the Fezembat Group, a consultancy partnership based in Castelnau de Montmiral, France, where she worked as the managing partner from 2007 to 2009.

From July 2009 until November 2013, Léautier relocated to Harare, Zimbabwe, and worked as the executive secretary of the African Capacity Building Foundation, a non-profit organization. She concurrently served as a Distinguished Professor at Sciences Po, Paris, from 2007 until December 2013.

In December 2013, Léautier returned to Tanzania and served as the co-founder, partner, and chair of Mkoba Private Equity Fund, which invested in emerging opportunities in the African continent, working there for two and a half years until June 2016.

In 2017, Léautier was one of the candidates to succeed Mark Dybul as executive director of the Global Fund to Fight AIDS, Tuberculosis and Malaria (GFATM); the position eventually went to Peter Sands.

Léautier left Mkoba to rejoin the Fezembat Group, where she continued as a strategic advisor. She served as vice-chair of the Board, the first independent board director and special advisor to the president.

Léautier worked at the African Development Bank (AfDB), serving as its senior vice president. She joined the Trade and Development Bank (TDB) in Nairobi as its chief operating officer in July 2018. In 2019, she became executive director for the Asset Management side of the Bank's business.

In May 2020, the SouthBridge Group announced the appointment of Léautier as a senior partner. Prior to the announcement, she had successfully served as a non-executive Board member and Chairperson of the Group's Board Risk & Audit Committee. As a senior partner, Léautier is responsible for new business development and will pursue the Group's ambitious strategy of growth in markets with demand for advisory services as well as taking on responsibility for investment activities.

== Other activities ==
Léautier served/serves as a board member on several regional and international organizations, including:

- United Nations Foundation, member of the board (since 2019)
- World Future Council, member (since 2019)
- African Risk Capacity (ARC), chair of the Risk and Audit Committee (since 2018)
- African Culture Fund (ACF), member of the board of directors
- Institute for Security Studies, member of the advisory board
- Orca Exploration Group Inc., member of the board
- Institute for Integrated Transitions (IFIT), member of the International Advisory Council
- World Economic Forum (WEF), member of the Regional Advisory Group for Africa
- Commissioner on the Economy and Climate - New Climate Economy
- Uongozi Institute (Leadership Institute), founding member of the board
- African Economic Research Consortium (AERC), treasurer, director at large
- Massachusetts Institute of Technology Corporation, Visiting Committee member
- Nelson Mandela African Institute of Science and Technology, founding member
- Journal of Infrastructure Systems, founding member
- King Baudouin Foundation USA, former member of the board of trustees
- Women's World Banking, former member of the board of trustees

== Honors and awards ==
In 2019, Léautier received an honorary doctorate in Law from Lancaster University in the United Kingdom, in acknowledgement of her work globally in infrastructure. In recognition for her contributions to Africa, she holds an honorary degree in Humane Letters from North Central College in Illinois, US.

In addition to winning various awards, including "Best Manager" and awards for excellence at the World Bank Group, she has repeatedly been featured in the New African Magazine list of 100 most influential people in Africa. She earned the title of ‘Nkosuohemaa’, meaning ‘queen of development’ in the Ahanta language, which was given to her by the Agona people for her work in Ghana. She was recognized in the first volume of the book African Women of Worth.

== Publications and academia ==
Léautier is a well-recognized author and academic, having published books, articles, and papers in international development, leadership, regional issues like integration and trade, and the role of Africa in the world. She taught master's-level courses and advised thesis students, and gave keynote lectures at Sciences Po, MIT, the Kennedy School at Harvard University, the New England Complex Systems Institute, Duke University and the University of Tokyo, among other institutions.

=== Selected publications ===
- Leadership in a Globalized World: Complexity, Dynamics and Risks
- Cities and Spaces of Leadership: A Geographical Perspective Book
- Development Drivers in Africa: Role of Innovation

== Personal life ==
Léautier is fluent in Kiswahili, French and English, with competency in Spanish and some knowledge of Arabic.
