= United to Beat Malaria =

Malaria awareness campaign

- Formation: established in 2006
- Purpose: Preventing malaria, malaria awareness, mosquito bed net distribution
- Headquarters: Washington, D.C.
- Location: United States
- Region served: Africa and Caribbean
- Website: beatmalaria.org

United to Beat Malaria, previously known as Nothing But Nets until 2022, is a global, grassroots campaign of the United Nations Foundation to raise awareness and funding to fight malaria.

The campaign aims to prevent malaria infections and deaths by providing malaria education, insecticide-treated bed nets, anti-malarial drugs, diagnostics, and other interventions to vulnerable and remote communities in sub-Saharan Africa, Latin America, and the Caribbean.

The organization's fundraising campaigns have seen wide popularity and success in the United States, especially among youth, with athletes, sports leagues, religious organizations and universities participating in large-scale campaigns.

== History ==
The organization started in 2006 after sportswriter Rick Reilly saw a documentary on malaria while visiting Venice. In April of 2006, Reilly wrote a column entitled "Nothing But Nets" in Sports Illustrated, where he challenged his readers to donate at least $10 for the purchase of anti-malaria bed nets.

Reilly also searched for an organization to help him distribute the nets, and contacted the United Nations Foundation. Reilly convinced the foundation to start a new organization named "Nothing But Nets" to appeal to sports fans. Within days of launching, the organization raised US$1.6 million and gained sponsorship by Major League Soccer and the National Basketball Association.

In 2012, Golden State Warriors point guard Stephen Curry partnered with the campaign, gaining significant publicity with a "3 for 3" pledge, in which he promised to donate 3 bed nets for every 3 pointer he scored. Curry continued working with the campaign until 2017. In 2018, Curry also released a limited edition shoe in partnership with sportswear company Under Armour, with profits from the shoe going toward the organization.

As the organization continued to grow, its efforts expanded beyond bed net distribution to encompass other efforts to fight malaria, and in 2022, the organization changed its name to "United to Beat Malaria."

== Activities ==
United to Beat Malaria's initial focus was solely on fundraising and distributing anti-malaria bed nets, but as the campaign continued, its activities expanded to include other activities, including:

- malaria education among the general public and populations vulnerable to malaria.
- advocacy for anti-malaria action.
- preventative medications for pregnant women.
- diagnostic testing.
- providing indoor residual spraying (IRS) to protect homes from mosquitoes.
- providing post-exposure medication.
- training and equipping community health workers.

As of 2023, United to Beat Malaria had distributed aid to more than 40 million people in 61 countries. In 2024, the organization helped protect over 1.67 million people.

== Partnerships ==
United to Beat Malaria has partnered with a wide range of groups, both for fundraising and outreach and for delivering assistance to communities affected by malaria.

For funding campaigns, partners have included organizations such as the National Basketball Association’s NBA Cares, Major League Soccer WORKS, the people of the United Methodist Church, Sports Illustrated, Bill and Melinda Gates Foundation, Boy Scouts of America and EBC Financial Group.

Celebrity partners that have assisted with fundraising include Rick Reilly, Stephen Curry, singer and actress Mandy Moore, WNBA champion Ruth Riley, and broadcaster Charlie Webster.

To deliver assistance to malaria-affected populations, the organization has partnered with corporations, including SC Johnson and Sumitomo Chemical to provide malaria prevention tools. The organization also works with UNICEF, the World Health Organization, UNHCR, and The Global Fund, among others, to deliver anti-malaria assistance.

== Events ==
United to Beat Malaria hosts an annual leadership summit in Washington, D.C. The purpose of the summit is to help participants develop leadership skills in fields of advocacy, policy, global health, and civics relating to the campaigns against malaria.

At the summit, advocates from across the US called "champions" meet with members of Congress to discuss malaria advocacy and education.

== See also ==
- Against Malaria Foundation
- Athletes for Hope
- Imagine No Malaria
- Malaria Consortium
