= Mrkonjić Grad mass grave =

Bosnian War atrocity

- Part of Bosnian War
- Location: Mrkonjić Grad, Bosnia and Herzegovina
- Date: 11-12 October 1995
- Target: Bosnian Serb soldiers and civilians
- Attack type: Executions
- Deaths: 181
- Perpetrators: Croatian Army (HV) and Croatian Defence Council (HVO)

In April 1996, the bodies of 181 Bosnian Serbs were exhumed from a mass grave in the village of Mrkonjić Grad, Bosnia and Herzegovina. The victims, both soldiers and civilians, are presumed to have been executed by Croatian Army (HV) and Croatian Defence Council (HVO) forces upon their entry and subsequent withdrawal from the village in October 1995, during the late stages of the Bosnian War.

== Background ==
From 8-11 October 1995, the Croatian Army (HV) and Croatian Defence Council (HVO) participated in Operation Southern Move, the final operation of the Bosnian War following the success of Operation Mistral 2. The objectives of the operation was to capture of the town of Mrkonjić Grad and positions on the Manjača Mountain which would allow the HV and the HVO to directly threaten Banja Luka, the largest city controlled by Bosnian Serbs. It would also assist the Army of the Republic of Bosnia and Herzegovina against Republika Srpska south of Skender Vakuf. Lastly, the offensive was also aimed at capturing the Bočac Hydroelectric Power Station, the last significant source of electricity under VRS control in western Bosnia and Herzegovina. This would ensure that Bosnian forces would abide by tentative ceasefire agreements, leading to eventual peace talks.

The operation achieved its objectives. After Mrkonjić Grad fell to Croatian forces, Serbian sources state that a total of 480 Serbs were killed or went missing. Following the signing of the Dayton Accords which brought about an end to the war, the town was handed back to Bosnian Serb control.

== Mass grave ==
In late March and early April 1996, a Serbian forensics team exhumed a mass grave in the town of Mrkonjić Grad's Serbian Orthodox cemetery which contained 181 victims. The exhumation was monitored by international organizations, including representatives from the International Criminal Tribunal for the former Yugoslavia (ICTY) in the Hague. 81 of the victims were civilians, 97 were Republika Srpska soldiers and 3 were members of the police forces. The youngest victim was 22 and the oldest was 90 years old.

According to the forensics team, the majority of the victims were killed by blows to the head using blunt instruments. 102 of the corpses had smashed skulls, along with fractures, and bullet holes at the back of the head from shots being fired at close range, demonstrating that they were not killed in action. Four of them had been decapitated. The atrocity was followed by burning and looting of homes.

== Aftermath ==
Republika Srpska police claimed the killings were committed by the 4th Guards Brigade to avenge the death of Colonel Andrija Matijaš, the brigade's deputy commander. The soldiers were under the command of Damir Krstičević. The results of the investigation were forwarded to the ICTY, who returned the information collected to the Republika Srpska authorities in 2006 without pursuing the matter.
