= Imagine No Malaria =

United Methodist Church anti-malaria campaign

Imagine No Malaria (INM) is a comprehensive anti-malaria campaign run by The United Methodist Church.

The ministry mission statement is: Imagine No Malaria is an extraordinary effort of the people of the United Methodist Church, putting faith into action to end preventable deaths by malaria in Africa, especially the death of a child or a mother. As a life-saving ministry, Imagine No Malaria aims to raise $75 million to empower the people of Africa to overcome malaria’s burden. Imagine No Malaria works in partnership with the United Nations Foundation and the Global Fund to reduce the number of deaths caused by Malaria in African countries.

== Leadership ==
Bishop Thomas Bickerton is the chairperson of the executive committee for Imagine No Malaria. He stated, "Today there's a 3-year-old who's going to be bitten by a tiny bug, and, in 48 hours, she is going to die. She's the reason I do what I do. To make the world a healthy place for every child has everything to do with what Mr. Wesley intended us to do."

== Strategy ==
Imagine No Malaria is a fundraising and advocacy campaign to support a comprehensive, integrated anti-malaria strategy in Africa. This program is focused on delivering four key components: prevention, treatment, education, and communications.

=== Prevention ===
Imagine No Malaria supports malaria prevention using insecticide-treated mosquito nets, diagnostic testing and medicine, draining standing water, and improving sanitation.

=== Treatment ===
The United Methodist Church has been working in Africa for more than 160 years. The church has the infrastructure of more than 300 clinics and hospitals in Africa to treat many patients. The Imagine No Malaria campaign has the goal of getting medicines and diagnostic tests to those hospitals and clinics.

=== Education ===
The program provides training for local community health workers to educate people on the symptoms and defenses against malaria, as well as educating them about how to use their bed nets.

=== Communications ===
The program provides education on malaria and information through its vast radio network in Africa. The campaign also delivers solar powered and hand-crank radios to African women.

== Fundraising ==
Imagine No Malaria is using current technology in its strive to achieve its $75 million fundraising goal. Donations can be made through text messages as well as in traditional ways. The operational costs for Imagine No Malaria are covered by a grant, awarded by the United Nations Foundation. This allows the effort to ensure that 100% of funds raised are used to support for malaria programs in Africa.

In 2014, The INM programme held a conference, in which they revealed that they were able to raise more than $40 million.

== Partners ==
The United Methodist Church is working on this project in conjunction with partners of a religious and secular nature. Partners include the World Health Organization, the United Nations Foundation, the Global Fund to Fight AIDS, Tuberculosis and Malaria, the Bill and Melinda Gates Foundation, the Red Crescent Society.

== Results ==
The Imagine No Malaria campaign has seen success in many different areas in Africa. In April 2010, in a coordinated effort with many different religious faiths and institutions, 25,000 bed nets were distributed in Lubumbashi, DRC. In another effort, the program distributed 5,000 bed nets in Nyadire, Zimbabwe.

== See also ==
- Nothing But Nets - An earlier anti-malaria campaign supported by the United Methodist Church
