= Thomas Bickerton =

American United Methodist bishop

Thomas J. Bickerton (born July 2, 1958) is an American United Methodist bishop. Bickerton was raised in West Virginia and graduated from West Virginia Wesleyan College in 1980 with a Bachelor of Arts degree in Sociology and Psychology. Subsequently, he entered seminary at Duke University Divinity School, completing his Master of Divinity degree in 1983. While attending seminary he served as student pastor following his ordination in 1982 as Deacon. His first appointment out of seminary was to Perry Memorial United Methodist Church, in Shady Spring, West Virginia, in June 1983; he served in that location for six years. In 1985 he was ordained as an Elder by Bishop William Boyd Grove. In 1989, he was appointed to serve Forrest Burdette Memorial United Methodist Church in Hurricane, West Virginia, where he pastored for the ensuing nine years. While in ministry there he also earned his Doctor of Ministry degree at United Theological Seminary, Dayton, Ohio, completing it in 1994. In 1998, he became District Superintendent of his home area, the Northern District.

In July 2004, at the Northeast Jurisdictional Conference of The United Methodist Church held in Syracuse, New York, he was elected and consecrated a bishop of the Church. Assigned to the Western Pennsylvania Annual Conference, headquartered at Pittsburgh, he relocated to serve his first quadrennium as a United Methodist Bishop. Bishop Bickerton and his family now live in Cranberry Township, Butler County, Pennsylvania. From 2005–2008, Bishop Bickerton also served as president of The United Methodist General Commission on Communication. He continues to serve as a member of the Commission's Executive Committee. Bishop Bickerton is married to Sally Bickerton. They have four children: Elizabeth, T.J., Ian, and Nicholas.

Bishop Bickerton was part of a group that created The Protocol, which was legislation intended to provide an amicable separation for the United Methodist Church. He later removed his support for the legislation.

== See also ==
- Imagine No Malaria
- List of bishops of the United Methodist Church
