= Elizabeth M. Cousens =

American diplomat (born 1963)

Elizabeth Cousens
- Occupations: President & CEO, United Nations Foundation

Elizabeth M. Cousens (born October 27, 1963) is the current President and CEO of the United Nations Foundation.

== Early life and education ==
Cousens received her B.A. in history from the University of Puget Sound and a D.Phil. in International Relations from the University of Oxford, where she was a Rhodes Scholar.

== Career ==
Cousins worked for several years at the U.S. Mission to the UN in New York. She was Principal Policy Advisor and Counselor to the Permanent Representative of the United States to the United Nations, and later served as the U.S. Ambassador to the UN Economic and Social Council and Alternate Representative to the UN General Assembly where she led U.S. negotiations on the SDGs (2012-2014); served on the boards of UN agencies, funds, and programmes; and was U.S. representative to the UN Peacebuilding Commission.

Elizabeth Cousens became the UN Foundation’s third president and CEO in 2020, selected to lead the Foundation’s next generation of work to support the United Nations.

On 23 May 2024, Cousens was among the guests invited to the state dinner hosted by U.S. president Joe Biden in honor of President William Ruto of Kenya at the White House.

== Works ==
- Elizabeth M. Cousens; Chetan Kumar; Karin Wermester (2001). Peacebuilding as Politics: Cultivating Peace in Fragile Societies. Lynne Rienner Publishers. pp. 113–. ISBN 978-1-55587-946-4.
- Elizabeth M. Cousens; Charles K. Cater (2001). Toward Peace in Bosnia: Implementing the Dayton Accords. Lynne Rienner Publishers. pp. 148–. ISBN 978-1-55587-942-6.
- Stephen John Stedman; Donald S. Rothchild; Elizabeth M. Cousens (2002). Ending Civil Wars: The Implementation of Peace Agreements. Lynne Rienner Publishers. pp. 273–. ISBN 978-1-58826-083-3.
- Charles Call; Elizabeth M. Cousens; International Peace Academy (2007). Ending Wars and Building Peace. International Peace Academy.
- Elizabeth M. Cousens (2018). Extremely loud and uncomfortably close: Lessons of the “Great War” 100 years on. Brookings Institution.
- Elizabeth Cousens (2018). 'Why I Won't Apologize for Using the Word "Multilateralism'. United Nations Foundation
- Call, Charles T.; Cousens, Elizabeth M. (2008). "Ending Wars and Building Peace: International Responses to War-Torn Societies". International Studies Perspectives. 9 (1): 1–21. doi:10.1111/j.1528-3585.2007.00313.x. ISSN 1528-3577. JSTOR 44218526.
