= Doboj shelling =

1992-1995 bombardment in Bosnia

- Part of Bosnian War
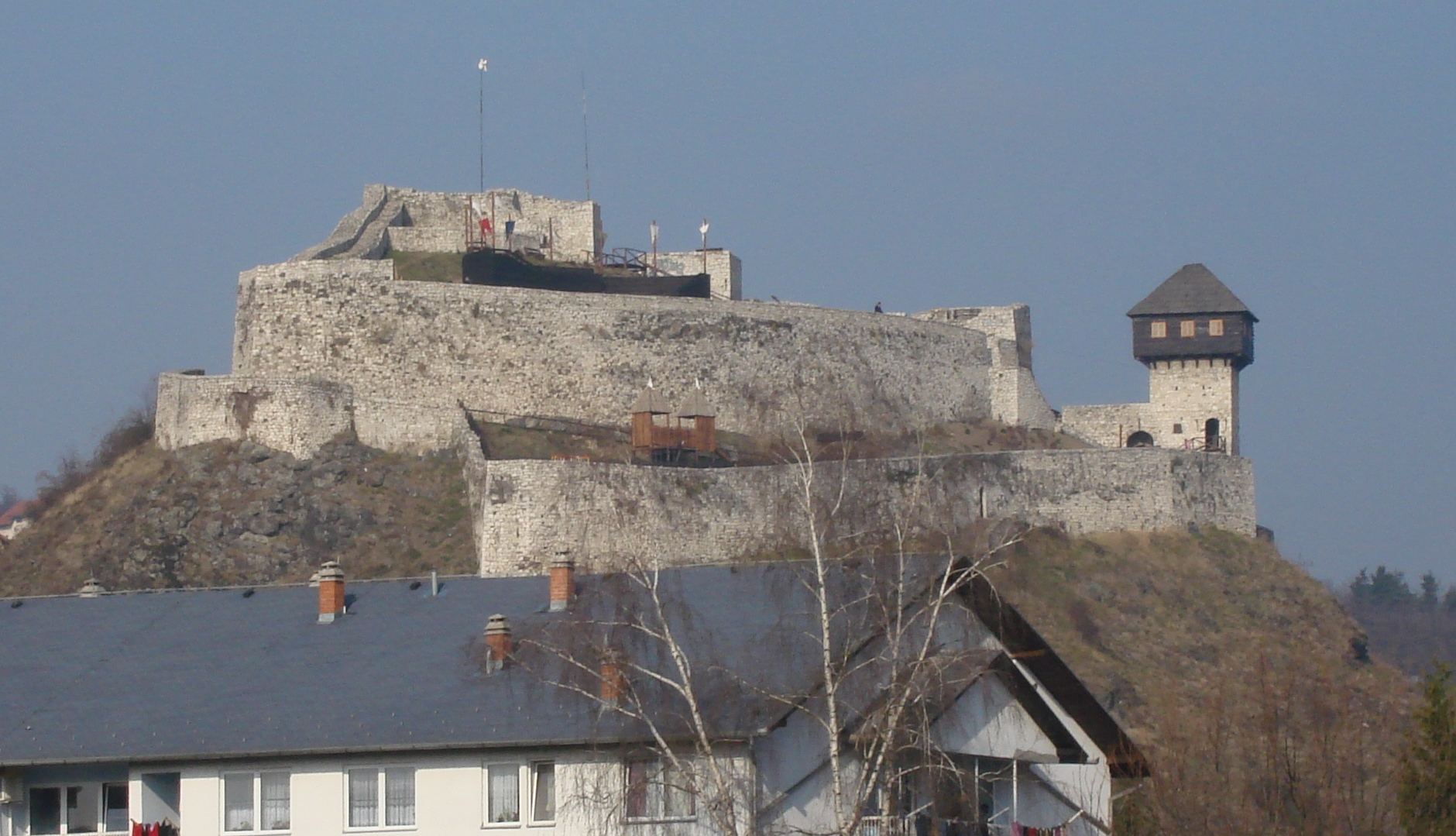
- Fortress in Doboj
- Location: Doboj, Bosnia and Herzegovina
- Date: 1992 — 1995
- Target: Bosnian Serb civilians
- Attack type: Mass killing, shelling campaign
- Deaths: 99
- Injuries: 399
- Perpetrator: Army of Republic of Bosnia and Herzegovina (ARBiH)

During the Bosnian War, the Army of the Republic of Bosnia and Herzegovina (ARBiH) launched shelling attacks against the city and municipality of Doboj between 1992 and 1995. According to a memorial plaque erected in 2000, the attacks killed 99 Bosnian Serb civilians (including several children) and left 399 others seriously wounded. The attacks began following the takeover and subsequent ethnic cleansing of non-Serbs in Doboj in May 1992.

The prosecution of alleged perpetrators is noted for being delayed for decades. In 2023, the District Court in Doboj confirmed the indictment of wartime commander Džemal Jukan, who was later sentenced to seven years in prison based on a non-final ruling in June 2026.

== Background ==
The municipality of Doboj was a strategically important region during the Bosnian War. Serb forces successfully seized the municipality by May 1992. Bosniaks and Croats faced mass arrests and disarmament, culminating in ethnic cleansing and the deaths of at least 408 non-Serbs.

== Shelling of Doboj municipality ==
=== Shelling in 1992-1994 ===
External videos
- Bosnia - Fighting Around Doboj During Ceasefire

In 1992, the Army of the Republic of Bosnia and Herzegovina (ARBiH) subjected the Serb-held Doboj to harassing fire from the outskirts of the city. Time reported in May 1993 that daily shelling left Doboj largely empty during the day. In 1994, equipped ARBiH soldiers launched an unsuccessful artillery offensive on the city of Doboj. According to The New York Times, which cited the Yugoslav news agency Tanjug, the attack persisted through May 1994. A 1994 report by Serb Republic Radio, reproduced in BBC's Summary of World Broadcasts, claims that the ARBiH used Hungarian rocket launchers during the shelling of Doboj.

The Doboj Regional Museum (pictured) was bombarded twice during the shelling.

Two separate shelling incidents on April 30, 1994, resulted in civilian casualties. According to a man interviewed by SRNA, the official news agency of Republika Srpska, his daughter and her fiancé were fatally shelled at their wedding. SRNA also reported that a shelling in central Doboj killed four children, leaving five more seriously injured. A Norwegian U.N. armored personnel vehicle was also targeted by a mortar shell on July 24, causing the unit's withdrawal from Doboj. A report by Europe's Parliamentary Assembly found that ARBiH shelled the Doboj Regional Museum twice, causing the destruction of various artifacts and other serious damage. According to a plaque, during the shelling attacks, 99 Serb civilians were killed, and hundreds more were seriously wounded.

=== Attacks in 1995 ===
Attacks in the Doboj municipality continued on August 10, 1995, when commander Džemal Jukan ordered an attack on Boljanić. After the fall of Vozuća in September 1995, there was a threat that the ARBiH and the Bosnian Mujahideen would reach Doboj. However, the Army of Republika Srpska (VRS) slowed down their offensive, and the advancement was halted. Human Rights Watch reported in 1996 that Doboj was still vulnerable to shelling by ARBiH throughout the war due to its proximity to the front lines.

== Legal aftermath ==
According to Nezavisne novine, the Doboj Police Department and the Doboj District Public Prosecutor's Office previously informed governments about reports of war crimes and crimes against humanity against civilians during the Doboj shelling. High-level ARBiH officers were reported to the Prosecutor's Office of BiH. During a testimony before the International Criminal Tribunal for the former Yugoslavia (ICTY), a witness confirmed that the shelling was treated as a crime against the civilian population.

On December 26, 1995, the Doboj Police Department filed a criminal complaint against nine individuals under suspicion of war crimes to the Doboj District Public Prosecutor's Office. This was followed up on November 13, 2001, when they filed a special report in support of the previous criminal complaint against one individual. The Doboj Police Department reported crimes against humanity against two separate individuals on March 30, 2012, and December 15, 2017, respectively.

A case involving eight individuals who were previously investigated for war crimes against civilians related to the Doboj shelling was officially transferred to the Prosecutor's Office of BiH on January 10, 2012.

=== Prosecution of Džemal Jukan ===
On March 27, 2023, the District Court in Doboj confirmed the indictment of wartime commander of the 221st Mountain Brigade, Džemal Jukan, for war crimes. According to the indictment, during the Doboj shelling, Jukan ordered an anti-aircraft machine gun to shoot buses travelling towards Ozren, killing at least one civilian. The indictment also alleged that during the attack on Boljanić, shots were fired, killing a civilian. The indictment further claims that Jukan broke international law by ordering the use of weapons against civilians.

In January 2025, Jukan was acquitted of his crimes at first instance. The city of Gračanica officially supported the decision as a "step towards justice." However, following a successful appeal that overturned the acquittal, he was sentenced to a non-final seven years in prison on June 23, 2026.

== Plaque ==
In March 2000, a plaque was erected in the Park of National Heroes in Doboj, honoring the 99 civilians killed and 399 wounded by the shelling of Doboj from 1992-1995.
