= Manjača =

Mountain in Bosnia and Herzegovina

- Мањача
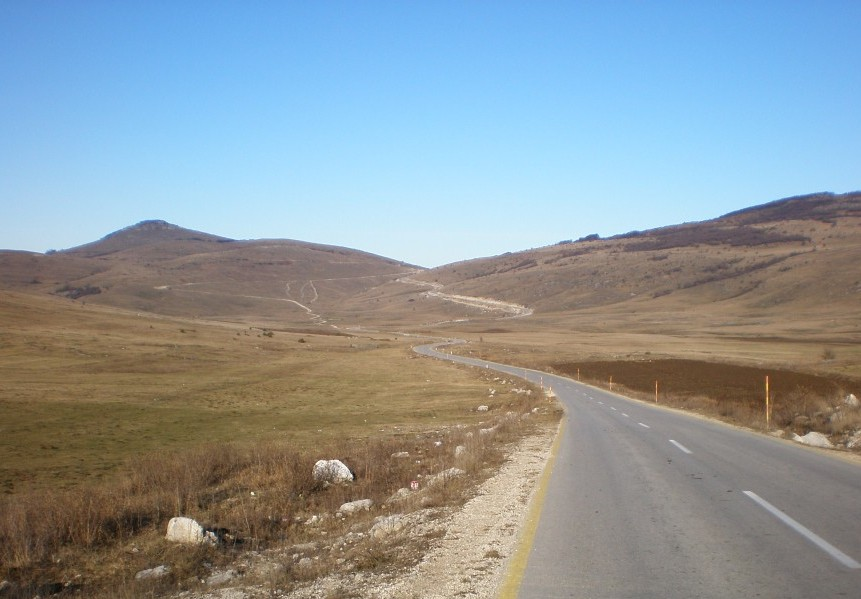
- Landscape of Manjača

Highest point
- Elevation: 1,239 m (4,065 ft)
- Coordinates: 44°34′04″N 17°03′24″E

Geography
- Location within Bosnia and Herzegovina
- Location: Bosnia and Herzegovina

Manjača (Serbian Cyrillic: Мањача) is a name of a mountain located 22 km south of the city Banja Luka, in the northern part of Bosnia and Herzegovina. Its highest peak is 1,239 m (4,065 ft) high peak Velika Manjača.

== History ==
The region was a stronghold during World War II for Serbian nationalist Chetnik fighters. After the climax of the war, the new communist government of Josip Broz Tito dispersed the local Serb population as retribution and established a large army base and firing range for the new Yugoslav People's Army (JNA).

It held a significant military base of the JNA in the second part of 20th century and was one of the military strongholds of the Army of Republika Srpska during the Bosnian War. The mountain became internationally renowned as it was the site of the Manjača Concentration camp run by Republika Srpska authorities.

Sometime in the 21st century a training center was established which would be used to train the Armed Forces of Bosnia and Herzegovina on a regular basis and additionally allied NATO forces during various exercises.
