= United Nations Association of the United States of America =

Pro-UN organization in the United States

- Abbreviation: UNA-USA
- Formation: 1943
- Type: NGO
- Headquarters: Washington, D.C., United States
- Executive Director: Rachel Bowen Pittman
- Senior Director: Farah Eck
- Senior Director Partnerships & Special Initiatives: Troy G. Wolfe
- Key people: Eleanor Roosevelt
- Main organ: National Council
- Parent organization: United Nations Foundation
- Website: unausa.org

The United Nations Association of the United States of America (UNA-USA) is the official United Nations Association of the United States, a nonprofit grassroots organization dedicated to promoting political and public support for the United Nations among Americans. It is a program of the United Nations Foundation. Its mission includes advocating for greater U.S. leadership at the UN, improving and enhancing the UN system, and implementing the Sustainable Development Goals and the UN Charter in both the U.S. and globally.

UNA-USA's activities include public outreach, political lobbying, and community organizing. It hosts youth programs, fellowships, and networking events both locally and nationally. Its flagship events include the Global Engagement Summit at the UN Headquarters in New York City and the Leadership Summit in Washington, D.C. UNA-USA is led by an executive director and governed by a thirty-member national council that meets semi-annually.

Along with its sister organization, the Better World Campaign, UNA-USA is the world's largest UN advocacy network. As of 2020, it has over 20,000 members across more than 200 chapters in cities and universities nationwide; the majority of members are under age of twenty-six. It is a member of the World Federation of United Nations Associations, which comprises other national UN advocacy organizations.

== History ==
The United Nations Association of the United States (UNA-USA) was founded during World War II to build American support for a new international organization designed to sustain the peace once the war was won. It considered itself the direct successor of the League of Nations Association, which was founded in 1923.
