= Better World Campaign =

- Formation: 1999
- Type: nonpartisan organization
- President: Peter M. Yeo
- Website: betterworldcampaign.org

The Better World Campaign (BWC) is a nonpartisan organization that works to strengthen the relationship between the United States and the United Nations through outreach, communications, and advocacy. Launched in 1999, BWC is a project of the Better World Fund. Together with the United Nations Foundation, they are a product of entrepreneur and philanthropist Ted Turner’s historic $1 billion gift in 1998 to support UN causes.

Led by Peter M. Yeo, the Campaign encourages U.S. leadership to enhance the UN’s ability to carry out its invaluable international work on behalf of peace, progress, freedom, and justice. In these efforts, BWC engages policy makers, the media, and the American public to increase awareness of and support for the United Nations.

BWC is a leading member of the U.S. Global Leadership Coalition.

== Key issues ==
The Better World Campaign builds support for U.S. policies that reinforce American engagement in the United Nations and educate people about the real benefits the U.S. receives through their relationships with the UN. BWC focuses on U.S.-UN relations, U.S. funding for the UN, peacekeeping, development, and global health issues.

=== US–UN relations ===
Headquartered in New York City, the United Nations is the primary forum for leaders across the globe to discuss the most serious challenges facing the world. The Better World Campaign believes that the UN is critical to enhancing American interests abroad, and with its help, the U.S. can share the burden with other countries and not have to go it alone in addressing the world’s problems.

According to a BWC 2014 poll conducted by the bipartisan research team of Public Opinion Strategies and Hart Research Associates, eighty seven percent of Americans agreed that it is important “for the United States to maintain an active role within the United Nations” and more than seven out of ten voters support the United States “paying our peacekeeping dues to the United Nations on time and in full.”

BWC hosts many events throughout the year on Capitol Hill and beyond to highlight the UN's work and cultivate close relationships between U.S. government officials and UN representatives.

=== US funding to the UN ===
The United Nations supports its activities through member countries' assessed dues as well as through voluntary contributions for funds and programs, such as the United Nations Children's Fund (UNICEF) and World Food Programme (WFP).

In the United States, the President requests funding for the UN in his annual budget proposal, and Congress refines his request and allocates funds in an annual appropriations bill under the oversight of the House and Senate Foreign Affairs Committees and the State, Foreign Operations and Appropriations subcommittees. The U.S. maintains significant financial contributions to the UN because leaders see significant return on the investment as the UN supports and advances many U.S. national interests. The formula that determines assessments is negotiated every three years by the U.S. and other member states and must be voted on.

The Better World Campaign works closely with Congress and the Administration to ensure that the U.S. is fulfilling its obligations by paying its dues to the UN.

=== UN peacekeeping ===
The United Nations oversees 14 peacekeeping operations around the world. With more than 100,000 troops and personnel deployed, UN peacekeepers make up the second largest deployed military presence in the world.

UN peacekeeping supports global and national security at a fraction of what it would cost to send in U.S. personnel – eight times more economical according to the Government Accountability Office (GAO). They draw upon the economic and human resources of UN Member States, allowing the U.S. to share the burden of protecting global peace and security and reducing the need for the U.S. to send their own military troops to volatile regions.

The Better World Campaign helps promote greater U.S. assistance to UN peacekeeping operations in order to strengthen each mission's capabilities in logistics, training, doctrine, and management expertise.

=== Global health ===
The Better World Campaign works to educate Members of Congress and their staff on key global health areas where the U.S. and the UN's work are complementary. BWC focuses most closely on issues like malaria, immunization and vaccinations, girls’ empowerment, voluntary family planning, and supports a variety of UN agencies including the World Health Organization, UNICEF, and UNFPA, among others.

== Leadership ==
Peter Yeo is the president of the Better World Campaign. Yeo leads the Campaign's strategic engagement with Congress and the Administration to promote a strong U.S.-UN relationship. He joined BWC in 2009 with over twenty years of legislative, analytical, and management experience, including senior roles on Capitol Hill and in the State Department. Under Yeo's leadership, BWC has helped ensure multibillion-dollar payments from the U.S. government to the UN and over $700 million in back dues. Yeo also serves as the Senior Vice President for the United Nations Foundation.

== Grassroots initiatives ==
The Better World Campaign works closely with the United Nations Association of the United States (UNA-USA)—together forming the largest grassroots network of UN supporters in the world—to inform, inspire and mobilize Americans to support the principles and vital work of the United Nations and to strengthen the United Nations system.

== Achievements ==
BWC has worked to generate support for achievements such as:

- Re-payment of $926 million in US debt to the UN, according to the terms of the 1999 Helms-Biden agreement. The final of 3 payments was released in September 2002.
- Full funding of US assessments for UN peacekeeping operations since 2001, preventing the accrual of new US arrears to the UN.
- Progress toward timely payment of US dues to the UN regular budget.
