= United Nations Foundation =

Charitable organization

- Formation: 1998
- Headquarters: Washington, D.C., U.S.
- Chairman: Ted Turner
- President and CEO: Elizabeth M. Cousens
- Revenue: $114,850,973 (2019)
- Expenses: $93,411,761 (2019)
- Website: unfoundation.org

The United Nations Foundation is a charitable organization headquartered in Washington, D.C., that supports the United Nations and its activities. It was established in 1998 with a $1 billion gift to the United Nations by philanthropist Ted Turner, who believed the UN was crucial for addressing the world's problems. Originally primarily a grantmaker, the UN Foundation has evolved into a strategic partner to the UN, mobilizing support to advance the Sustainable Development Goals (SDGs), and help the UN address issues such as climate change, global health, gender equality, human rights, data and technology, peace, and humanitarian responses. The UN Foundation's main work occurs through building public-private partnerships, communities, initiatives, campaigns, and alliances to broaden support for the UN and solve global problems. The UN Foundation has helped build awareness and advocate for action on, among others, antimicrobial resistance, regional action on climate change, local implementation of the SDGs, as well as global campaigns such as Nothing But Nets against malaria, the Measles & Rubella Initiative, the Clean Cooking Alliance, Girl Up, Shot@Life, and the Digital Impact Alliance, among others. In March 2020, the UN Foundation was also a key founder of the COVID-19 Solidarity Response Fund on behalf of the World Health Organization (WHO), helping to raise over $200 million USD within the first six weeks to support the global response to the COVID-19 pandemic.

The UN Foundation was founded with the intent to build support for UN causes and to advocate for the United States to honor its financial commitments to the UN. Since then, the UN Foundation and its U.S. advocacy sister organization, the Better World Campaign, have built advocacy campaigns, provided grants, connected experts, advocates, and decision-makers, and driven public awareness in order to support the UN and its priorities and programs worldwide. The UN Foundation is now supported by a variety of philanthropic, corporate, government, and individual donors, and it continues to serve as a substantial source of private funding to the United Nations. In conjunction with the UN, it established the United Nations Fund for International Partnerships to serve as the UN counterpart to the Foundation.

The UN Foundation has made a cumulative disbursement of more than $1.5 billion in grants to the UN system. The UN Foundation also works with UN partners in order to provide policy, advocacy, event, and communications recommendations and support. The UN Foundation's budgetary breakdown in 2019 was $95.8 million to program services, $5.7 million to fundraising, and $8.9 million going to management and overhead.

== History ==
In 1998, Ted Turner, an American media proprietor, producer, and philanthropist, announced his decision to make a $1 billion contribution to the United Nations at the annual United Nations Association of the USA gala dinner, with then UN Secretary-General Kofi Annan present. This $1 billion donation was used to establish the United Nations Foundation. In 1998, American media entrepreneur and philanthropist Ted Turner pledged US$1 billion to support the work of the United Nations. The donation led to the creation of the United Nations Foundation, an independent charitable organization that supports UN causes and activities.

Beyond his philanthropy work, Turner is best known for founding cable television network CNN, as well as the Turner Broadcasting System (TBS) and Turner Entertainment Company. Turner chose to donate to the UN and create the UN Foundation because he was a prior donor to similar causes and felt strongly that the UN was critical to solve the world’s most pressing challenges. Turner’s gift was also inspired by the fact that the UN was underfunded at the time because the U.S. government had not met its allocated financial contribution to the UN due to a lack of sufficient appropriations in the federal budget. Prior to his $1 billion donation to the UN, Turner was already an active philanthropist and had been a proponent for the protection of the environment, especially in combating global warming. Turner believed that his $100 million per year donation over the course of 10 years would make a difference to the United Nations, and that he could use this donation to encourage other wealthy members of society to make financial contributions to the work of the UN. In 1996, Turner was worth $3.2 billion due to his shares in Time Warner (which had bought TBS that year). By giving away nearly a third of his wealth while still living, Ted Turner became a noted participant in the Giving Pledge movement.

== Leadership ==
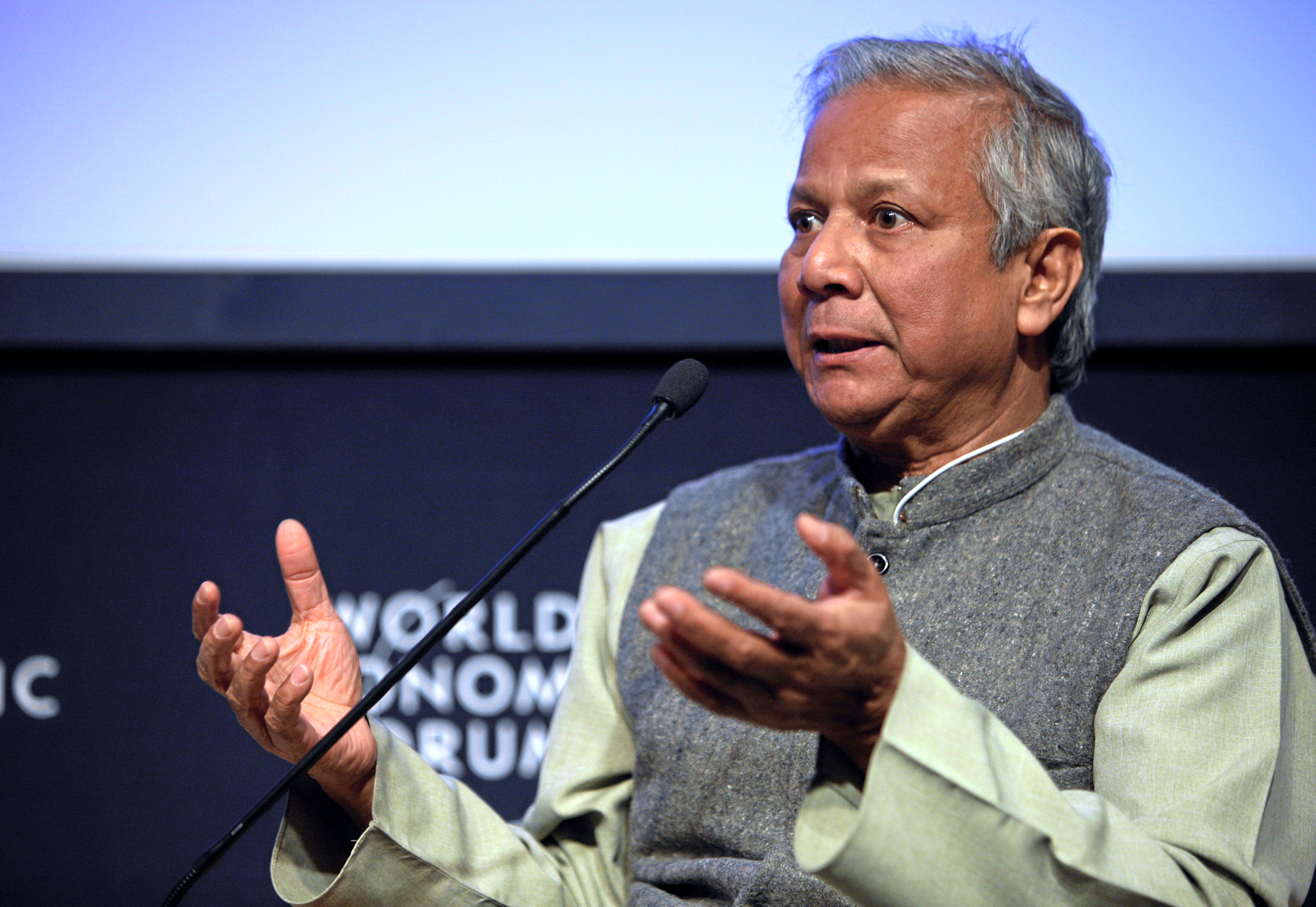
Muhammad Yunus, a member of the UN Foundation's board of directors

The UN Foundation is led by President and Chief Executive Officer Elizabeth Cousens, who stepped into the role in January 2020 after serving for four years as Deputy CEO. Prior to her time at the UN Foundation, Cousens served as U.S. Ambassador to the UN Economic and Social Council, and Alternate Representative to the UN General Assembly where she led U.S. negotiations on the SDGs. Kathy Calvin, the former President of AOL Time Warner Foundation, served as the UN Foundation’s prior President and CEO from 2013 through 2019. Timothy E. Wirth, a former United States Congressman, U.S. Senator, and the first Undersecretary of State for Global Affairs in U.S. President Bill Clinton's administration, served as the UN Foundation's first President from 1998 to 2013. Ted Turner serves as the chairman of the board. Other current board members include Queen Rania Al-Abdullah of Jordan, former Deputy Secretary-General of the UN Mark Malloch-Brown, Founder and Chairman Emeritus of Infosys N. R. Narayana Murthy, Master of University College Oxford Valerie Amos, CEO of Verizon Communications Hans Vestberg, Former Prime Minister of Norway Gro Harlem Brundtland, Nobel Peace Prize winner Muhammad Yunus, President of the University of Miami Julio Frenk, Chairman of Endeavor Brazil Fábio Colletti Barbosa, Senior Partner of the Southbridge Group Dr. Frannie Léautier, Chair of the Captain Planet Foundation Laura Turner Seydel, and former UN Foundation Presidents Timothy E. Wirth and Kathy Calvin.

== Background of Foundation's involvement with the UN ==
When the UN Foundation was founded, it was created to assist the UN with a variety of key issues, and bring attention to particular global problems. A top priority was to build upon previously-successful UN programs, including children's health, population and family planning issues, global environmental agreements, and the safe removal of land-mines. Additionally, it aimed to work with the private sector to raise funding for UN causes, and to raise awareness of the UN and its programs amongst the American population.

The UN Foundation has had a close relationship with the UN and its leadership from the beginning in order to set goals and provide funding for particular programs. Over time, the UN Foundation evolved from being a simple funding conduit to creating and fostering its own initiatives and communities, which enabled it to support UN priorities more deeply and diversely. At present, it continues to build and expand its role as a strategic partner to the UN across multiple sectors. The UN Foundation’s current main issue areas include the UN’s Sustainable Development Goals (SDGs), gender equality, climate and environment, global health, and enhancing global cooperation. The Foundation has also continued working in areas of US-UN engagement and advancing data and technology for the SDGs.

== Issue areas ==
=== Sustainable Development Goals ===
One of the UN Foundation’s overarching goals is to share awareness, advance progress, understand critical gaps, and activate communities in support of the Sustainable Development Goals. The SDGs, a set of 17 interlinked goals designed to be a "blueprint to achieve a better and more sustainable future for all," were adopted in 2015 by the United Nations General Assembly as a successor to the Millennium Development Goals. While all of the UN Foundation’s programs connect to at least one SDG (and often multiple), the Foundation also works to foster awareness and support of the SDGs among civil society, the private sector, academia, and engaged communities. The Foundation is also a key partner in Global Goals Week, which runs parallel to the UN General Assembly week and engages diverse partnerships for the SDGs. The Foundation also houses the Business Council for the United Nations, which creates connections between the private sector and the UN in support of the UN’s priorities and the SDGs.

=== Global Health ===
Global health, often with a focus on women and children, has been one of the UN Foundation’s key global issue areas. Over the Foundation’s first 20 years, 72% of grants fell under the issue area of global health. The Foundation works closely with private sector partners and UN agencies in order to address a variety of health issues including universal health coverage, antimicrobial resistance, and the response and recovery from COVID-19. In addition, the UN Foundation has built partnerships and campaigns to address issues such as measles and rubella, childhood vaccination, and malaria.

The Measles & Rubella Initiative, launched in 2001, is a partnership between the UN Foundation, the American Red Cross, UNICEF, the U.S. Centers for Disease Control and Prevention (CDC), and the World Health Organization (WHO) in order to provide measles vaccinations to children across the African continent. This campaign not only focuses on vaccinating children, but also putting into place health infrastructure, and promoting better access to health-care across the continent. In ten years, the initiative has protected more than 5.5 billion children from measles.

The UN Foundation also runs the Nothing But Nets Campaign, which is targeted at reducing malaria across the African continent. This campaign originally started when Sports Illustrated writer Rick Reilley published an article asking his readers to donate money to a campaign to buy mosquito nets for those in Africa suffering from malaria. With support from the UN Foundation, Reilley's project got off the ground, and has to-date provided over 13 million nets across Africa. Today, the campaign also encourages Americans to learn about, advocate for, and donate to malaria eradication efforts.

The UN Foundation's Shot@Life campaign educates, connects and empowers Americans to champion vaccines as one of the most cost-effective ways to save the lives of children in developing countries. The campaign encourages Americans to learn about, advocate for, and donate vaccines to decrease vaccine-preventable childhood deaths. As of 2019, Shot@Life had protected over $4.1 billion in U.S. funding for global childhood immunization programs and helped provide more than 82 million vaccines through direct grant support to UN partners.

The UN Foundation is a communications and advocacy partner for the Global Polio Eradication Initiative, a partnership that includes Rotary International, the Gates Foundation, UNICEF, CDC, and WHO. The initiative is dedicated to globally eradicating polio through vaccinations and has protected 2 billion children from polio.

Every Woman Every Child was launched by UN Secretary-General Ban Ki-moon during the United Nations Millennium Development Goals Summit in 2010 and aims to save and improve the lives of millions of women, children and adolescents around the world by 2030. It is a global effort to mobilize international and national action by governments, multilaterals, the private sector and civil society to address health challenges facing women and children around the world.

In March 2020, at the onset of the COVID-19 pandemic, the UN Foundation launched the COVID-19 Solidarity Response Fund in partnership with the Swiss Philanthropy Foundation to raise funds for WHO’s COVID-19 response. The fund raised over $200 million within six weeks, which went toward WHO’s efforts to track and understand the spread of the virus, to mobilize protective equipment to frontline health workers, and to develop vaccines, tests, and treatments. Beneficiaries of the fund were later expanded to include UNICEF, the Coalition for Epidemic Preparedness Innovations (CEPI), the World Food Programme (WFP), the UN Refugee Agency (UNHCR), and the United Nations Relief and Works Agency for Palestine Refugees in the Near East (UNRWA). The foundation also helped raise funds for the Access to COVID-19 Tools Accelerator campaign by accepting donations through the ACT Together Fund.

In September 2020, the UN Foundation launched its Unite for Health campaign, focused on the need for global collaboration amidst the disruption of health systems and services due to COVID-19, and the rollback of global health progress it brought. In September 2020, the United Nations Foundation launched the Unite for Health campaign to promote global collaboration in response to disruptions to health systems and services caused by the COVID-19 pandemic and to address setbacks in global health progress.

=== Girls and Women ===
Gender equality is another one of the Foundation’s key issue areas. The Foundation has several campaigns and initiatives that address gender issues; their work includes girls’ leadership and empowerment, family planning and contraceptive access, maternal health, and gender data. All its work on gender equality is represented by the Equal Everywhere brand and campaign that calls for all levels of society to make equality the reality of every girl and woman.

The UN Foundation launched the Girl Up campaign in September 2010. This "for girls, by girls" campaign offers leadership development and education opportunities for adolescent girls. Through Girl Up's support, girls create middle school, high school, or campus clubs, which then plan events to raise money and awareness for the importance of women's issues. Money raised by the clubs is often used to support girls in developing countries so that they have the opportunity to become educated, healthy, safe, counted, and positioned to be the next generation of leaders.

The Universal Access Project works to achieve universal access to reproductive health care by convening donors and advocates to protect and strengthen global sexual and reproductive health and rights. Its goal is to increase and maintain the U.S. involvement and funding for global family planning by protecting key investments.

Family Planning 2020, an outcome of the 2012 London Summit on Family Planning, addresses the policy, financing, delivery and socio-cultural barriers to women accessing contraceptive information, services and supplies. Led by an 23-member Reference Group, operated daily by a Secretariat, and hosted by the United Nations Foundation, FP2020 is based on the principle that all women, no matter where they live should have access to lifesaving contraceptives.

Data2X, a collaborative technical and advocacy platform, was formed after former U.S. Secretary of State Hillary Rodham Clinton called for its creation in a policy speech in July 2012 and cited the lack of reliable and regular data on the lives of women and girls. Through research, advocacy and communications, Data2X works to improve the availability, quality, and use of gender data to make a practical difference in the lives of women and girls worldwide.

=== Climate and Environment ===
The UN Foundation’s priorities include tackling global climate change, advancing climate diplomacy and negotiations, building cross-issue intersections, and communicating climate science to the public. The Foundation’s climate team works with partners in the NGO sector, the UN, governments, and private corporations to come up with solutions and provide funding to programs related to this issue. The UN Foundation also advocates for the Paris Agreement on climate change, particularly in the United States where it supports the U.S. Climate Alliance, a bipartisan coalition of states and unincorporated self-governing territories that are committed to upholding the objectives of the 2015 Paris Agreement.

The UN Foundation also fosters the Clean Cooking Alliance, an initiative supporting large-scale adoption of clean and safe household cooking solutions as a way to save lives, improve livelihoods, empower women, and reduce climate change emissions. The alliance works with public, private, and non-profit partners to overcome market barriers that hamper the production, deployment, and use of clean cookstoves and fuels in the developing world. It works to develop standards for cleaner stoves and to increase public and policymaker awareness of the health and environmental benefits of improved stoves.

== Global Leadership Awards ==
The We the Peoples Global Leadership Awards are awarded to seven people in various categories in New York City each year.

== Campaigns, alliances, initiatives, and communities ==
- +SocialGood, a global community of changemakers who connect with each other and the UN, share ideas, and advance solutions to achieve the SDGs in their communities.
- 3D Program for Girls and Women, a program addressing gender equality among local governments and through civil society and private sector partnerships.
- ACT Together Fund, a fundraising initiative to increase donations to the Access to COVID-19 Tools Accelerator program.
- Better World Campaign, the UN Foundation’s sister organization that advocates for Congress to ensure that the US maintains its financial and bipartisan support of the United Nations.
- Business Council for the United Nations, an initiative that connects forward-thinking companies with the UN to collaborate and solve global challenges.
- Clean Cooking Alliance, an alliance supporting the large-scale adoption of clean and safe household cooking solutions as a way to save lives, improve livelihoods, empower women, and reduce climate change emissions.
- Data2X, a platform working to improve the quality, availability, and use of gender data.
- Digital Impact Alliance, an alliance that identifies digital solutions to achieve the Sustainable Development Goals.
- Family Planning 2020, an initiative that works to expand global access to family planning and sexual and reproductive health resources.
- Girl Up, a campaign that provides leadership training, education, and opportunities for girls to get involved in organizing, advocacy, fundraising, and communication activities.
- Global Partnership for Sustainable Development Data, a network working to improve data to monitor and achieve the Sustainable Development Goals.
- Measles & Rubella Initiative, an initiative focusing on eradicating measles and rubella worldwide.
- Nothing But Nets, a campaign raising awareness and funding to fight malaria.
- Peace on Purpose, a partnership with lululemon to support the mental health and wellbeing of frontline workers through mindfulness.
- Shot@Life, a campaign raising awareness and funding to ensure that children around the world have access to lifesaving vaccines.
- United Nations Association of the United States of America, an association of U.S. based chapters that promote political and public support for the United Nations among Americans.
- The U.S. Climate Alliance, a bipartisan coalition of states and unincorporated self-governing territories in the U.S. that are committed to upholding the objectives of the 2015 Paris Agreement on climate change.
- Universal Access Project, an initiative that convenes U.S. foreign aid donors and non-governmental organizations to protect and strengthen global sexual and reproductive health and rights.
