= Bijeljina massacre =

Killing of civilians by Serb paramilitary groups in Bijeljina during Bosnian Civil War

- Part of the Bosnian War and the Bosnian genocide
- Ron Haviv's image showing Srđan Golubović (a member of the Serb Volunteer Guard) kicking Tifa Šabanović, a dying Bosnian Muslim woman
- Location: 44°45′27″N 19°13′03″E; Bijeljina, Bosnia and Herzegovina
- Date: 1–2 April 1992
- Target: Bosnian Muslims
- Attack type: Mass killing
- Deaths: 48–78 verified
- Perpetrators: Serb Volunteer Guard; White Eagles
- Motive: Establishment of homogenous Serb territory

The Bijeljina massacre involved the killing of civilians by Serb paramilitary groups in Bijeljina on 1–2 April 1992 in the run-up to the Bosnian War. The majority of those killed were Bosnian Muslims. Members of other ethnicities were also killed, as well as Serbs deemed disloyal by the local authorities. The killings were committed by a local paramilitary group known as Mirko's Chetniks and by the Serb Volunteer Guard (SDG, also known as Arkan's Tigers), a Serbia-based paramilitary group led by Željko "Arkan" Ražnatović. The SDG were under the command of the Yugoslav People's Army (JNA), which was controlled by Serbian President Slobodan Milošević.

In September 1991, Bosnian Serbs had proclaimed a Serbian Autonomous Oblast with Bijeljina as its capital. In March 1992, the Bosnian referendum on independence was passed with overwhelming support from Bosnian Muslims and Bosnian Croats. However, Bosnian Serbs either boycotted it or were prevented from voting by Bosnian Serb authorities. A poorly organised, local Bosnian Muslim Patriotic League paramilitary group had been established in response to the Bosnian Serb proclamation. On 31 March, the Patriotic League in Bijeljina was provoked into fighting by local Serbs and the SDG. On 1–2 April, the SDG and the JNA took over Bijeljina with little resistance; murders, rapes, house searches, and pillaging followed. These actions were described as genocidal by the historian Professor Eric D. Weitz of the City College of New York. Professor Michael Sells of the University of Chicago concluded that they were carried out to erase the cultural history of the Bosnian Muslim people of Bijeljina.

Around 3 April, Serb forces removed the bodies of those massacred in anticipation of the arrival of a Bosnian government delegation tasked with investigating what had transpired. The International Criminal Tribunal for the former Yugoslavia (ICTY) and the Serbian War Crimes Prosecutor's Office were able to verify between 48 and 78 deaths. Post-war investigations have documented the deaths of a little over 250 civilians of all ethnicities in the Bijeljina municipality during the war. After the massacre, a campaign of mass ethnic cleansing of non-Serbs was carried out, all mosques were demolished, and nine detention camps were established. Many deaths in Bijeljina were not officially listed as civilian war victims and their death certificates claim they "died of natural causes."

As of December 2014, local courts had not prosecuted anyone for the killings, and no members of the SDG had been prosecuted for any crimes the unit carried out in Bijeljina or elsewhere in Croatia or Bosnia and Herzegovina. Milošević was indicted by the ICTY and charged with carrying out a genocidal campaign that included Bijeljina and other locations, but died during the trial. Republika Srpska leaders Biljana Plavšić and Momčilo Krajišnik were convicted for the deportations and forcible transfers in the ethnic cleansing that followed the massacre. Radovan Karadžić, the former President of Republika Srpska, was convicted for the massacre and other crimes against humanity committed in Bijeljina. Jovica Stanišić and Franko Simatović, Serbian intelligence officers, were also convicted. At the end of the war, fewer than 2,700 Bosnian Muslims still lived in the municipality from a pre-war population of 30,000. The Serbs of Bijeljina celebrate 1 April as "City Defense Day", and a street in the city has been named after the SDG.

== Background ==
Location of the town of Bijeljina in Bosnia and Herzegovina.

According to the 1991 census, the municipality of Bijeljina had approximately 97,000 inhabitants. The demographic proportions were approximately 59% Bosnian Serbs, 31% Muslims and 10% belonged to other ethnicities. The town of Bijeljina itself had 36,414 inhabitants, 19,024 of whom were Muslims (or 52% of the town's population), while the Serbs were the second largest ethnic group in the town.

During 1990, a group of Serb Yugoslav People's Army (JNA) officers and experts from the JNA's Psychological Operations Department had developed the RAM Plan with the intent of organizing Serbs outside of Serbia, consolidating control of the Serbian Democratic Party (SDS), and preparing arms and ammunition. In 1990 and 1991, Serbs in Croatia and Bosnia and Herzegovina had proclaimed a number of Serbian Autonomous Oblasts with the intent of later unifying them into a homogeneous Serb territory. As early as September or October 1990, the JNA began arming Bosnian Serbs and organizing them into militias. That same year, the JNA disarmed the Territorial Defense Force of the Republic of Bosnia and Herzegovina (TORBiH). By March 1991, the JNA had distributed an estimated 51,900 firearms to Serb paramilitaries and 23,298 firearms to the SDS. Throughout 1991 and early 1992, the SDS heavily Serbianized the police force in order to increase Serb political control. In September 1991, Bijeljina was established by the Bosnian Serbs as the capital of the Serbian Autonomous Oblast of Northern Bosnia, later renamed in November as the Serbian Autonomous Oblast of Semberija, renamed again in December as the "Serbian Autonomous Oblast of Semberija and Majevica". In response, local Bosnian Muslims established the paramilitary Patriotic League of Bosnia and Herzegovina, shortened to the Patriotic League.

In January 1992, the SDS assembly proclaimed the "Republic of the Serbian People of Bosnia and Herzegovina" and Radovan Karadžić, its soon-to-be president, announced that a "unified Bosnia and Herzegovina no longer exists". In March, the Bosnian referendum on independence passed with overwhelming support from Bosnian Muslims and Bosnian Croats, having been boycotted by most Bosnian Serbs. The SDS, claiming that independence would result in the Serbs becoming "a national minority in an Islamic state", had used armed irregular units to block the delivery of ballot boxes, and dropped leaflets encouraging the boycott. Despite this, thousands of Serbs in larger cities did participate in the referendum and voted for independence, and several violent incidents were triggered across Bosnia and Herzegovina. According to historian Noel Malcolm, the "steps taken by Karadžić and his party – [declaring Serb] "Autonomous Regions", the arming of the Serb population, minor local incidents, non-stop propaganda, the request for federal army "protection" – matched exactly what had been done in Croatia. Few observers could doubt that a single plan was in operation." Bijeljina was strategically significant because of its location, which enabled the easy movement of military personnel, weaponry, and goods into Posavina and the Bosnian Krajina where Serb forces were gathered.

== Provocation, takeover, and massacre ==
Željko Ražnatović ("Arkan"), leader of the Serb Volunteer Guard (SDG), spent a month in Bijeljina devising battle plans prior to the attack. On 30 March 1992, Blagoje Adžić, Bosnian Serb chief-of-staff of the JNA, announced that the army was "ready to protect Serbs from open aggression". Fighting broke out in Bijeljina on 1 April, after local Serbs and SDG personnel threw grenades into shops, including a Bosnian Muslim-owned cafe, provoking the poorly organized Patriotic League into an armed conflict. About a thousand SDG members and Mirko's Chetniks, a paramilitary formation commanded by Mirko Blagojević, were involved and captured important structures in the town. According to journalist and political analyst Miloš Vasić, Bijeljina was defended by 35 or 38 Bosnian policemen. According to the International Criminal Tribunal for the former Yugoslavia (ICTY), Bijeljina was the "first municipality of Bosnia and Herzegovina to be taken over by the Bosnian Serbs in 1992". Despite the pro-Serb activities of the JNA during the Croatian War of Independence, the Chairman of the Presidency of Bosnia and Herzegovina, Alija Izetbegović apparently believed that the JNA would act differently in Bosnia and Herzegovina, and asked the JNA to defend Bijeljina against the SDG.

On 1–2 April 1992, the town was surrounded by JNA forces, ostensibly to keep the peace. According to Human Rights Watch (HRW), Serb paramilitaries wearing balaclavas took up positions around the city, including sniper positions in windows on the top floor of buildings. Meeting little resistance, the SDG, under JNA command and reporting directly to Serbian President Slobodan Milošević, swiftly captured Bijeljina. Artillery units shelled the town in coordination with the street fighting. According to photojournalist Ron Haviv, Serb forces struck first, with several busloads of soldiers arriving in the city, seizing the radio station, and forcing local Serbs to reveal the identities of the city's non-Serb residents. A paramilitary group led by Ljubiša "Mauzer" Savić, who was a founder of the SDS, also participated in the assault or arrived shortly after. Together with the SDG, they began a campaign of violence against local Bosnian Muslims and some of the Serb population, committing several rapes and murders, and searching residents' houses and pillaging their property. Subsequently, Bosnian President Izetbegović tasked the JNA with occupying Bijeljina and stopping the violence. At Karadžić's trial, the former Mayor of Bijeljina Cvijetin Simić, testified that the only real fighting that took place in the town on 1–2 April happened around the city hospital, where the most fatalities occurred.

As the fighting progressed, the SDS and the Bosnian Serbs created the Ministry of Interior of Republika Srpska (MUP RS), an independent Serb police force. According to HRW, a pattern of violence, fueled by "the strive to create a Greater Serbia", developed in Bijeljina that was later repeated in other municipalities in north-eastern Bosnia and Herzegovina by similar paramilitary groups from Serbia. This pattern was described by the United Nations Commission of Experts in the following terms:

First, Bosnian Serb paramilitary forces, often with the assistance of the JNA, seize control of the area. In many cases, Serbian residents are told to leave the area before the violence begins. The homes of non-Serb residents are targeted for destruction and cultural and religious monuments, especially churches and mosques, are destroyed. Second, the area falls under the control of paramilitary forces who terrorize the non-Serb residents with random killings, rapes, and looting. Third, the seized area is administered by local Serb authorities, often in conjunction with paramilitary groups. During this phase, non-Serb residents are detained, beaten, and sometimes transferred to prison camps where further abuse, including mass killings, have occurred. Non-Serb residents are often fired from their jobs and their property is confiscated. Many have been forced to sign documents relinquishing their rights to their homes before being deported to other areas of the country.

The exact number killed in the takeover is unknown. Several sources put the figure anywhere between several dozen and a thousand. According to the ICTY, at least 48 civilians were killed of which 45 were non-Serbs. Around 3 April, a local policeman was ordered to guard a hearse which was picking up bodies from the streets and houses of the town. The killings were eliticidal with the aim of erasing cultural history and included "political leaders, businessmen, and other prominent Bosnian Muslims", but also included women and children. Several Serbs who had attempted to stop the massacre were also killed. An investigation by the ICTY later stated that the victims had been shot "in the chest, mouth, temple, or back of the head, some at close range" and that none had been wearing military uniforms. According to the historian Professor Eric D. Weitz of the City College of New York, the killing of Bosnian Muslims in Bijeljina was a genocidal act. The acts against civilians in Bijeljina and those carried out by the JNA and special forces that followed were an attempt to intimidate and sidetrack the Bosnian government and general public from pursuing independence.

Haviv, whom Arkan had invited to take photographs, witnessed the killings and one of his pictures, which depicted an SDG member kicking a dying Muslim woman, was later published in the international media, prompting Arkan to put out a death warrant for Haviv. Meanwhile, the Serbian state-owned Radio Belgrade network reported that Bijeljina had been "liberated" with the help of "members of the Serbian National Guard of Semberija and Majevica, in cooperation with Serbian volunteers, Arkan's men, and the Serbian 'radicals'".

== Bosnian delegation investigation and response ==
Serb forces ordered the removal of the bodies of those killed, in anticipation of a delegation of high-ranking Bosnian officials due to arrive on 4 April. The delegation included Biljana Plavšić, a Serb representative of the Presidency; Fikret Abdić, a Muslim representative; the Croat Minister of Defence, Jerko Doko; and the chief-of-staff of the JNA 2nd Military District, General Dobrašin Praščević. They were sent by Izetbegović to investigate the alleged atrocities. On the same day, the JNA moved into Bijeljina, but the violence continued. On 4 April, the SDG established itself in the local headquarters of the SDS. Local police, who were engaged in arresting the town's Party of Democratic Action (SDA) presidency, joined them for several days, as did members of the White Eagles paramilitary group and local Territorial Defense (TO) members. Serb flags were mounted on two mosques in Bijeljina, and checkpoints and roadblocks were established, preventing journalists and European monitors from entering. The delegation visited the crisis staff and a military barracks, where they were made aware of the situation.

During the visit, Plavšić requested that Arkan transfer control of Bijeljina to the JNA. Arkan refused, citing unfinished business, and said he would target Bosanski Brod next. Plavšić consequently withdrew her request and commended Arkan for "protecting" Bijeljina's Serbs from the Muslims. She called him a "Serb hero ... who was prepared to give his life for his people", adding that "we need such people". She then thanked and kissed Arkan in public to which the local members of the SDS responded with "shouts of approval". In a conversation with Cedric Thornberry, a United Nations Protection Force (UNPROFOR) representative, she described Bijeljina as a "liberated" town. Abdić was initially turned back at gunpoint, but was later able to enter. He was then kept in custody by Arkan until Plavšić arrived to release him. "Bijeljina was practically empty," he recalled. "I met with the local authorities, they told me what had happened, but there wasn't a single Muslim there, so we couldn't discuss the problem as a whole. Muslims didn't answer our appeal. They were too scared to come out, and specially scared to talk about it at all." General Sava Janković, commander of the JNA's 17th Corps, reported that:

A big influence of the SDS and Arkan's propaganda is felt in the 38th [Partisan Division] and the 17th [Mixed Artillery Regiment], because of which some [conscripts] have left their units with arms. ... The situation in the territory is extremely complex. The town of Bijeljina is controlled by the SDS and Arkan's men, who do not even allow our anti-tank unit to reach certain positions in the town. There are about 3,000 refugees in the barracks and the Cooperative Hall area in Patkovača. A team from the BH Presidency led by Fikret Abdić, Biljana Plavšić, the chief-of-staff of the 2nd Military District and the commander of the 17th Corps, has been in Bijeljina barracks since 1200 hours.

"In the following days," he predicted, "further deterioration of the entire security and political situation is expected. There is a threat that interethnic conflicts in Posavina and Semberija might spread to other parts of the zone of responsibility ... Direct armed provocations by SDA, HDZ [Croatian Democratic Union], and SDS paramilitary units against commands and units are also possible, as well as attacks by them on military warehouses and isolated facilities." On the same day, Bosnian Defense Minister Ejup Ganić and Croat members of the coalition government urged Izetbegović to mobilize the TORBiH due to the inability of the JNA to stop the violence. Izetbegović described the images coming out of Bijeljina as "unbelievable". "I thought it was a photomontage," he explained. "I couldn't believe my eyes. I couldn't believe it was possible." He described the takeover as "criminal", and said he considered the JNA responsible for Bijeljina's fall because it "passively stood by and watched what was happening". Izetbegović mobilized the Territorial Defense later that day to "enable people to defend themselves ... from future Bijeljinas". The Serb members of the Bosnian Presidency, Plavšić and Nikola Koljević, denounced the mobilisation as illegal and resigned. On 8 April, Izetbegović announced a "state of imminent war danger". The JNA rejected requests from the Bosnian Presidency to return the TORBiH's weapons that they had confiscated in 1990. Karadžić and the Bosnian Serb leadership used Izetbegović's mobilisation order as a pretext to independence. They mobilised their Municipal Crisis Headquarters, reserve police units, and TO forces.

== Ethnic cleansing, mosque destruction, and detainment ==
The SDG stayed in Bijeljina until at least May 1992. General Manojlo Milovanović, chief-of-staff of the Army of Republika Srpska (VRS), commented on Arkan's activities in Bijeljina and Zvornik in April and May 1992: "The return of Serb voluntary units from the Republika Srpska and Republika Srpska Krajina was characterized by long formations consisting of both personnel carriers and tanks and a great number of trucks. This was a clear sign of looting." The ICTY concluded that Serb forces killed a minimum of 52 people, mostly Muslims, between April and September 1992 in the Bijeljina municipality. In April, an "organised campaign" had begun to remove the Muslim population of Bijeljina. The SDS in Bijeljina put forth a plan and proposed that a Muslim family be killed "on each side of town to create an atmosphere of fear". On 23 September 1992, the SDG and Mirko's Chetniks handed over control of Bijeljina to the SDS and the plan was carried out by Duško Malović's special police unit. On 24 and 25 September, in the village of Bukreš, 22 people including seven children were removed from their homes and taken to the village of Balatun where they were killed and thrown into the Drina river. It is suspected that they were killed by members of the Special Unit of the MUP RS under the supervision of local police and the former State Security. All were under the direct command of Mićo Stanišić the then Minister of MUP RS. Mass ethnic cleansing was committed and nine detention camps were established following the massacre. All seven mosques in Bijeljina were destroyed. They were systematically destroyed using explosives under the supervision of police and experts. After their collapse the remains were removed with military construction equipment. Trees were planted where they once stood.

A "State Commission for the Free transfer of the Civilian Population" or "Commission for the Exchange of Population" was created and headed by Vojkan Đurković, a major in the SDG, and included Mauzer's Panthers. Its purpose was to expel all non-Serbs from Bijeljina completely. Đurković claimed that the Muslims had left voluntarily and said Bijeljina was "sacred Serbian land". According to him "after a time, the [Bosnian Serb] People's Deputies, Milan Teslić and Vojo Kuprešanin, expanded the Commission in the name of the [Serb Democratic Party] Deputies Club, and later the Commission was approved by the Parliament of the Serbian Republic [of Bosnia and Herzegovina]." He explained that "travel [expulsion] was undertaken in the following manner: the State Commission for the Free Transfer of the Civilian Population had as its duty to inform the State Security Service of the Serbian Republic [of Bosnia and Herzegovina] (Republika Srpska) of that travel. The latter, by fax, would then pass that on to the ministry in the Republic of Serbia, which has jurisdiction. The transit [on to Hungary] would occur in broad daylight, at noon." Expulsions continued into 1994, and in July a "systematic program" was implemented with the goal of "expelling the remaining Muslims and extorting property and money from them". Đurković was promoted by Arkan to lieutenant colonel in 1995. Mauzer's Panthers later became a special unit of the VRS. Mauzer was killed in 2000.

== War crimes prosecution ==
"We live with the former war criminals, we see them every day in the streets."

— Branko Todorović, President of the Helsinki Committee for Human Rights in Bijeljina

Bosnian courts have not filed any war crimes indictments for the massacre. In 2008, Branko Todorović, the President of the Helsinki Committee for Human Rights in Bijeljina, criticised the "lethargic" and "unacceptable behaviour" of the Republika Srpska judiciary. However, since 2003, the prosecution of war crimes has mostly been under the jurisdiction of the Court of Bosnia and Herzegovina. In 2000, the International Crisis Group named three individuals from Bijeljina as "potentially indictable for war crimes":

- Mirko Blagojević: who is alleged to have led Mirko's Chetniks, which took part in the attack and the ethnic cleansing of Bijeljina. He served as the head of the Serbian Radical Party (SRS) in Bijeljina and is now a lawyer.
- Vojkan Đurković: who is suspected of forcing Muslim civilians "to hand over all their money, valuables and documents, and to sign away their property". He is also reported to have worked with the Panthers and other groups in the "forcible expulsion of the civilian population". He was arrested in November 2005, but released from police custody less than a month later.
- Jovan Aćimović: who is alleged to have played a major role in the last initiative to remove Muslims from Bijeljina shortly before the signing of the Dayton Agreement in November 1995. He reportedly continued to evict Muslims from their houses during peacetime. He later became a police member in Ugljevik.

In 1997, the ICTY secretly indicted Arkan for war crimes carried out in Sanski Most in 1995, but not for those in Bijeljina. In January 2000, he was killed in a Belgrade hotel lobby by masked gunmen, and did not face trial. In 1999, Milošević was indicted for carrying out a genocidal campaign that included Bijeljina and other locations in Bosnia and Herzegovina, among other charges, but he died mid-trial in March 2006. In February 2000, Biljana Plavšić and Momčilo Krajišnik, the speaker of the National Assembly of Republika Srpska, were indicted for the same genocidal campaign in Bosnia and Herzegovina, among other charges. On 2 October 2002, Plavšić pleaded guilty to persecuting the non-Serb populations in 37 municipalities in Bosnia and Herzegovina, including Bijeljina. This plea was entered under an agreement that involved the prosecution moving to dismiss the remaining charges. She was subsequently sentenced to 11 years' imprisonment. On 27 September 2006, Krajišnik was found guilty on five counts of crimes against humanity, including the same count as Plavšić regarding the persecution of non-Serb populations in municipalities including Bijeljina, but he was found not guilty of genocide. In 2009, he was handed a twenty-year prison sentence. After serving two-thirds of her sentence, Plavšić was released in October 2009. Krajišnik was released in August 2013, having served two-thirds of his sentence (including time spent in custody).

In 2010, the Serbian War Crimes Prosecutor's Office investigated Borislav Pelević, a former SDG member and a member of the Serbian National Assembly. The investigation was ultimately dropped due to lack of evidence. In 2012, former SDG member Srđan Golubović was arrested in Belgrade at the request of the Prosecutor's Office. Golubović was charged with an indictment listing the names of 78 victims. Clint Williamson, the lead prosecutor, said that other members of the SDG could not be identified because their faces had been covered with masks. Radovan Karadžić, the former President of Republika Srpska, was sentenced to a life in prison. In 2023, the follow-up International Residual Mechanism for Criminal Tribunals sentenced Serbian State Security officers Jovica Stanišić and Franko Simatović for aiding and abetting the crime of murder, as a violation of the laws or customs of war and a crime against humanity, and the crimes of deportation, forcible transfer, and persecution, as crimes against humanity in Bijeljina, included them in a joint criminal enterprise, and sentenced them each to 15 years in prison. The Tribunal concluded:

[Stanišić and Simatović] shared the intent to further the common criminal plan to forcibly and permanently remove the majority of non-Serbs from large areas of Croatia and Bosnia and Herzegovina.

As of December 2014 no member of the SDG has been prosecuted for the murders, rapes, or looting committed in Bijeljina, or any of the crimes allegedly committed by the unit elsewhere in Croatia or Bosnia and Herzegovina.

== Aftermath ==
The Research and Documentation Center in Sarajevo has recorded a total of 1,078 fatalities in the Bijeljina municipality during the war, including approximately 250 civilians of all ethnicities. Many deaths in Bijeljina were not officially listed as civilian war victims, and their death certificates claim they "died of natural causes." After the war ended, less than 2,700 people of the pre-war Muslim population of over 30,000 still lived in the municipality of Bijeljina (the town itself had 19,000 Muslim inhabitants). Many faced difficulties in returning to their homes, including discrimination from the police, being unable to receive an identification card, or reconnecting their phone lines. Local authorities prevented the Islamic community from reconstructing a mosque and, for a while, did not allow them to have their local meeting place. Meaningful Muslim participation in the politics and administration of the municipality was also blocked. As of 2012, 5,000 Muslims have returned to Bijeljina.

In 2007, the Bijeljina truth commission was created with a four-year mandate. It held two public hearings in 2008, but by March 2009, although it was not formally disbanded, the commission was effectively dissolved when most of its members resigned. Several factors have contributed to its failure, including the commander of the Batković concentration camp in its delegation, its limited legal standing, disputes over the commission's scope, and poor funding.

Local Serbs celebrate 1 April as "City Defence Day", and a street in the town is presently named after the Serbian Volunteer Guard. In 2012, the Bijeljina municipal veterans organization, municipal officials, and city leaders marked the occasion, stating that "on this day the Serbian people of Semberija were organised to defend against and prevent a new Jasenovac and notorious 13th Handschar division."

== See also ==
- List of massacres in the Bosnian War
- List of massacres of Bosnian Muslims
- Bosnian genocide
