= Erdut killings =

Massacre during the Croatian War of Independence

Coordinates: 45.525095°N 19.059371°E

- Erdut on the map of Croatia, JNA/Croatian Serb-held areas in late 1991 are highlighted in red
- Location: Erdut, Croatia
- Date: 10 November 1991 – 3 June 1992
- Target: Hungarian and Croat civilians
- Attack type: Mass murder, ethnic cleansing
- Deaths: 37
- Perpetrators: SAO SBWS Territorial Defence Forces, Serb Volunteer Guard

The Erdut killings were a series of murders of 37 Hungarian and Croat civilians in the village of Erdut, Croatia committed by Croatian Serb forces and Serb Volunteer Guard paramilitaries between November 1991 and June 1992, during the Croatian War of Independence. Twenty-two Hungarians and 15 Croats were killed. The first killings occurred on 10 November 1991, when twelve civilians died. Eight more were killed over the following several days. Five more civilians were killed on 10 December, and another seven on 16 December. Four others were killed on 21 February 1992 and the final one was killed on 3 June. The bodies of these victims were either buried in mass graves or thrown into nearby wells.

Most of the victims were exhumed in 1998, after the area reverted to Croatian control following the signing of the Erdut Agreement in 1995. The International Criminal Tribunal for the former Yugoslavia (ICTY) charged several Serbian and Croatian Serb officials, including Slobodan Milošević, Jovica Stanišić, Franko Simatović and Goran Hadžić, for their alleged involvement in the killings. Milošević and Hadžić died before their trials could be completed. Stanišić and Simatović were convicted for persecution and murder in Daljska Planina in June 1992.

== Background ==
In 1990, following the electoral defeat of the government of the Socialist Republic of Croatia by the Croatian Democratic Union (Croatian: Hrvatska demokratska zajednica, HDZ), ethnic tensions between Croats and Serbs worsened. The Yugoslav People's Army (Jugoslovenska Narodna Armija – JNA) confiscated the weapons of Croatia's Territorial Defence (Teritorijalna obrana - TO) forces to minimize resistance. On 17 August, tensions escalated into an open revolt by Croatian Serbs, centred on the predominantly Serb-populated areas of the Dalmatian hinterland around Knin, parts of the Lika, Kordun, Banovina and eastern Croatia. This revolt was followed by two unsuccessful attempts by Serbia, supported by Montenegro and Serbia's provinces of Vojvodina and Kosovo, to obtain the Yugoslav Presidency's approval for a JNA operation to disarm Croatian security forces in January 1991.

After a bloodless skirmish between Serb insurgents and Croatian special police in March, the JNA itself, supported by Serbia and its allies, asked the Federal Presidency to give it wartime authorities and declare a state of emergency. The request was denied on 15 March, and the JNA came under the control of Serbian President Slobodan Milošević. Milošević, preferring a campaign to expand Serbia rather than to preserve Yugoslavia, publicly threatened to replace the JNA with a Serbian army and declared that he no longer recognized the authority of the Federal Presidency. By the end of the month, the conflict had escalated into the Croatian War of Independence. The JNA stepped in, increasingly supporting the Croatian Serb insurgents and preventing Croatian police from intervening. In early April, the leaders of the Croatian Serb revolt declared their intention to integrate the area under their control, known as SAO Krajina, with Serbia. The Government of Croatia viewed this declaration as an attempt to secede. In May, the Croatian government responded by forming the Croatian National Guard (Zbor narodne garde - ZNG), but its development was hampered by a United Nations (UN) arms embargo introduced in September. On 8 October, Croatia declared independence from Yugoslavia.

== Prelude ==
Map of eastern Slavonia area between Osijek and Vukovar (Modern county lines provided for reference)

The first artillery attack against ZNG units in Erdut occurred on 25 July, when 24 mortar rounds were fired by the JNA from the Serbian province of Vojvodina on the opposite bank of the Danube. Besides the damage to the medieval Erdut Castle, the attack caused six deaths and resulted in the injury of 18 soldiers from the 1st Guards Brigade. The unit deployed approximately a hundred troops, stationed in a facility normally operated by Osijek water supply utility, earlier that month. The general area of the villages of Dalj, Erdut and Aljmaš was targeted by an artillery bombardment in the early morning of 1 August. Croatian sources indicate that the artillery fire came from the JNA 51st Mechanised Brigade on the left bank of the Danube and the Croatian Serb TO. The JNA denied taking part in the bombardment.

Shortly after the bombardment, as the Croatian Serb TO and Serbian Volunteer Guard (SDG) paramilitaries attacked the police station in Dalj, the Croatian police requested the JNA's assistance in terminating the TO attack. As the JNA deployed, it reported receiving gunfire from the ZNG 1st Company of the 1st Battalion of the 3rd Guards Brigade in Erdut as it moved towards 15 kilometres (9.3 miles) of road between Bogojevo and Dalj and returning fire before proceeding to Dalj. Conversely, the International Criminal Tribunal for the former Yugoslavia (ICTY) witness of the event claimed that the JNA fired against civilian homes in Erdut unprovoked. The same day, the JNA tanks entered Erdut. After the takeover, Croatian Serbs established the government of the SAO Eastern Slavonia, Baranja and Western Syrmia (SAO SBWS)—a breakaway territory in Croatia—in Erdut, and Serbia's Special Anti-Terrorist Unit, specifically its commander Radovan Stojičić, set up an SDG camp in the village, run by Željko Ražnatović. The second half of 1991 saw the fiercest fighting of the war, as the 1991 Yugoslav campaign in Croatia culminated in the Siege of Dubrovnik, and the Battle of Vukovar. At the same time, Croatian Serb authorities began systematically expelling non-Serb civilians in areas under their control. The expulsions in the area of Erdut and elsewhere in eastern Slavonia were primarily motivated by the aim of changing the ethnic composition in favour of Serbs and the resettling of Serb refugees who had fled western Slavonia following operations Swath-10 and Hurricane-91.

== Timeline ==
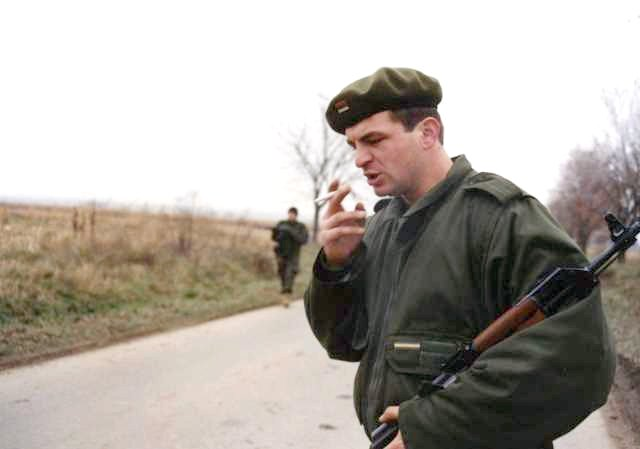
Serbian Volunteer Guard troops in Erdut in December 1991

On 9 November, the Croatian Serb TO and the SDG arrested ethnic Hungarian and Croat civilians in Erdut as well as in the nearby villages of Dalj Planina and Erdut Planina, and detained them in the SDG training camp. According to the ICTY prosecutor's office, twelve members of the group were killed the next day. The bodies of eight of the victims were buried in the village of Ćelije, one was buried in Daljski Atar and three bodies were thrown down a well in Borovo Selo. Five more non-Serb civilians were arrested by the Croatian Serb TO and the SDG in the village of Klisa on 11 November, one in Bijelo Brdo and one in Dalj, and taken to Erdut for interrogation. Two of the seven had Serb relatives and were released, while the remaining five were brutally treated, and were killed and buried in a mass grave in Ćelije after being interrogated. Three more civilians, including the family members of those killed on 10 November, were arrested and executed by Croatian Serb TO and SDG personnel in mid-November.

The killings continued the next month, when the Croatian Serb TO and the SDG arrested five more non-Serb civilians in Erdut. They were killed at the TO training centre in Erdut and the bodies of three were thrown down a well in Daljski Atar. Seven more Hungarian and Croat civilians were arrested by the Croatian Serb TO and police and the SDG in Erdut and detained in the Erdut training centre until 26 December, when they were killed. The bodies of six of them were also thrown into a well in Daljski Atar.

Further killings occurred on 21 February 1992, when four non-Serb civilians were arrested by Croatian Serb forces and the SDG and killed in the training centre after being interrogated. The four were subsequently buried in a mass grave in Daljski Atar. One more Hungarian civilian, Marija Senaši was murdered by the Serbian State Security Service—with SDG assistance—on 3 June 1992, after inquiring about her relatives who were killed in November 1991. Her body was thrown down a well in Dalj Planina. With her murder, the total number of civilians killed in Erdut between November 1991 and June 1992 reached 37, of which 22 were Hungarians and 15 were Croats.

== Aftermath ==
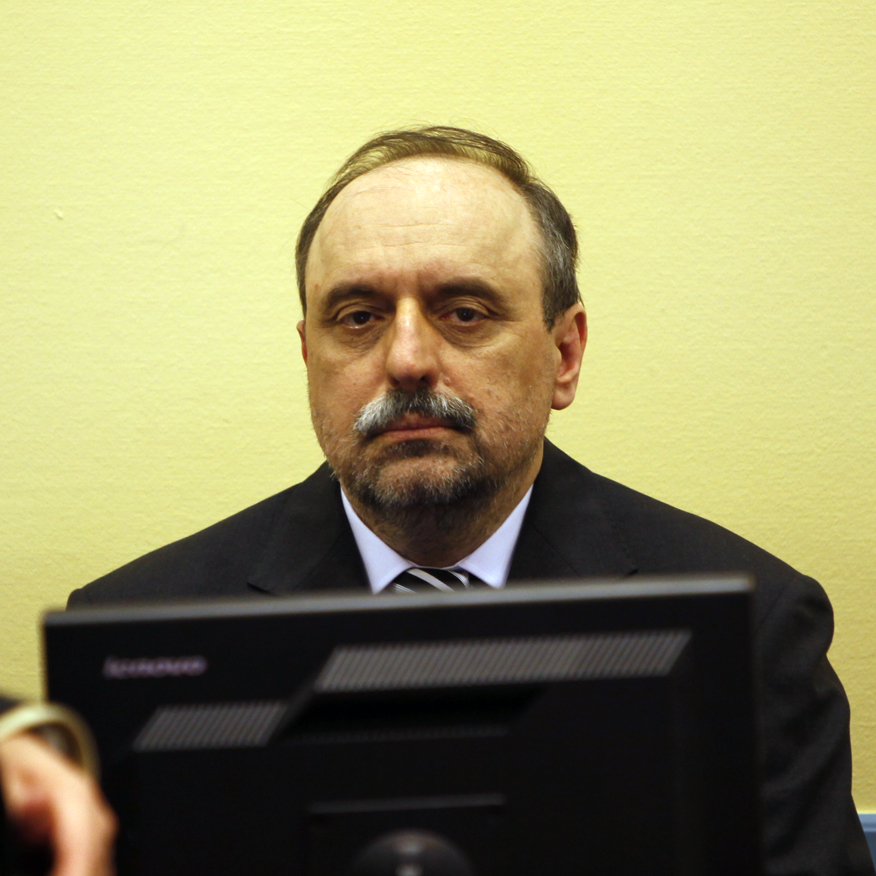
Goran Hadžić at the ICTY in 2011

In August 1995, following Operation Storm, Croatia regained control of territories previously held by Croatian Serb forces, with the exception of eastern Slavonia—the region around Erdut. Eastern Slavonia was gradually transferred to Croatian control based on the Erdut Agreement signed on 12 November 1995, and the transfer, facilitated by United Nations peacekeepers, was completed on 15 January 1998.

In October 1998, three bodies were retrieved from a well in Erdut. Days later, more bodies were retrieved from a well in Daljski Atar, where a total of 23 victims were found. A total of 32 sets of human remains were recovered in the village of Ćelije by 2012. The mass grave in Ćelije is toured annually by a procession commemorating the victims buried there and in several other locations in eastern Slavonia, while the site in Daljski Atar is marked by a monument to the civilian victims since 2013.

=== War crime charges ===
The ICTY charged Milošević with the extermination of non-Serb civilians in Erdut, the forcible transfer of at least 2,500 inhabitants of the village and destruction of their property. Milošević's trial commenced on 12 February 2002, but he died in March 2006 before a verdict could be reached. The SDG, which became the most powerful paramilitary formation in eastern Slavonia, and Ražnatović gained notoriety for war crimes and ethnic cleansing. The SDG systematically plundered villages in the region, turning the area into a source of oak lumber, crude oil and wine for Ražnatović to sell in Serbia, and in Erdut itself. Ražnatović was never charged for any war crimes committed by the SDG in Erdut. The ICTY only charged him with several war crimes committed in or near Sanski Most. He was assassinated in Belgrade on 15 January 2000 before he could stand trial.

The ICTY charged Jovica Stanišić, deputy head of Serbia's State Security Service in 1991, and Franko Simatović, head of the Special Operations Unit of the State Security Service and subordinate to Stanišić, in connection with the war crimes committed in Erdut and elsewhere. The indictment specifically charged them with facilitating communication between Milošević and various Serb forces in Croatia, as well as providing training, logistics and funding to those forces as part of a joint criminal enterprise, planning of war crimes and practical assistance to the physical perpetrators of various war crimes. According to an ICTY witness, Stanišić and Simatović provided assistance to the SDG throughout the war. The ICTY trial chamber acquitted both of them on 30 May 2013. The acquittals were overturned on 15 December 2015 and a new trial resumed. In 2023, the follow-up International Residual Mechanism for Criminal Tribunals sentenced Stanišić and Simatović for aiding and abetting murder and persecution (the case of Marija Senaši) as a crime against humanity in Daljska Planina in June 1992, as well as other crimes in Bosnia and Herzegovina, included them in a joint criminal enterprise, and sentenced them to 15 years each.

The ICTY also indicted Goran Hadžić, a Croatian Serb political leader at the time and the head of the SAO SBWS government, before the SAO SBWS merged into the Republic of Serbian Krajina. The charges include war crimes of persecutions, extermination, murder, imprisonment, torture, inhumane acts and cruel treatment, deportation, forcible transfer of population, wanton destruction and plunder of property in Erdut and elsewhere. He died of brain cancer in July 2016, aged 57, and judgement was never passed. On 31 July 2012, Croatian authorities indicted Božo Bolić, the commander of the police station in Erdut in late 1991 and 1992, and charged him with unlawful arrests and abuse of civilian population, who were later turned over to the SDG. As of 2014, Bolić remains at large.

== See also ==
- Dalj massacre
- List of massacres in Croatia
