= Mito =

Mito may refer to:

== Places ==
=== Japan ===
- Mito, Ibaraki, capital city of Ibaraki Prefecture
  - Mito Domain, a domain in the Edo period
- Mito, Aichi, a town
- Mito, Shimane, a town
- Mitō, Yamaguchi, a town

=== Elsewhere ===
- Mito (district), in central Ethiopia
- Mito District, in the province of Concepción, Peru

== People with the given name ==
- Mito Pereira (born 1995), Chilean golfer
- Tsukino Mito (月ノ美兎), Japanese VTuber affiliated with Nijisanji

== People with the surname ==
- Mito Natsume (三戸 なつめ; born 1990), Japanese model, television personality and singer

=== Fictional characters ===
- Mito (Hunter × Hunter), a character from the manga series Hunter × Hunter
- Anji Mito, a character from the video game Guilty Gear
- Ikumi Mito, a character from Shokugeki no Sōma

== Other ==
- Mitochondrial disease, a group of disorders caused by mitochondrial dysfunction
- Cagiva Mito, an Italian sports motorcycle made by Cagiva
- Alfa Romeo MiTo, a mini Italian sports car made by Alfa Romeo between 2008 and 2018
- Vasconcellea candicans, a South American plant
- Mito, a type of currency in the video game Drift City
- Mito Tokugawa family, a branch of the Tokugawa Gosanke clan in Japan
- Minimum Interval Take Off, an Air Force technique
- Space Pirate Mito, an anime series
- Nickname of former Brazilian president Jair Bolsonaro
- NHK Mito Broadcasting Station

== See also ==
- Art Tower Mito, an arts complex in Mito, Ibaraki, Japan
- Miko (disambiguation)
- Milo (disambiguation)
- MIMO (disambiguation)
- Miño (disambiguation)
- Mio (disambiguation)
- Miso (disambiguation)
- MIT (disambiguation)
- Mite (disambiguation)
- Mitu (disambiguation)
