= Doboj ethnic cleansing =

War crimes committed against Bosniaks and Croats in the Doboj area

Coordinates: 44°44′N 18°08′E

- Doboj municipality
- Date: May–September 1992
- Attack type: mass killing, ethnic cleansing, forced transfer
- Deaths: ~322 Bosniak civilians 86 Croat civilians
- Perpetrators: Bosnian Serb forces, JNA, White Eagles, Red Berets
- Motive: Serbianisation, Greater Serbia, Anti-Bosniak sentiment, Anti-Croat sentiment

The Doboj ethnic cleansing refers to war crimes, including murder, forced deportation, persecution and wanton destruction, committed against Bosniaks and Croats in the Doboj area by the Yugoslav People's Army and Serb paramilitary units from May until September 1992 during the Bosnian war. On 26 September 1997, Serb soldier Nikola Jorgić was found guilty by the Düsseldorf Oberlandesgericht (Higher Regional Court) on 11 counts of genocide involving the murder of 30 persons in the Doboj region, making it the first Bosnian Genocide prosecution. The International Criminal Tribunal for the former Yugoslavia (ICTY) classified it as a crime against humanity and sentenced seven Serb officials.

Out of over 40,000 Bosniaks recorded in the municipality, only around a 1,000 remained after the war. According to the Research and Documentation Center (IDC), 2,323 people were killed or went missing in the Doboj municipality during the war. Among them were 322 Bosniak civilians and 86 Croat civilians.

== Takeover of Doboj in 1992 ==
Doboj was strategically important during the Bosnian War. Before the war, in 1991, the population of the municipality had been 40.14% Bosniak (41,164), 38.83% Serb (39,820), 12.93% Croat (13,264), 5.62% Yugoslav (5,765) and others 2.48% (2,536). The town and surrounding villages were seized by Serb forces in May 1992 with the Serbian Democratic Party taking over the governing of the city. What followed was a mass disarming and mass arrests of all non-Serb civilians (namely Bosniaks and Croats).

Widespread looting and systematic destruction of the homes and property of non-Serbs commenced on a daily basis with the mosques in the town razed to the ground. Many of the non-Serbs who were not immediately killed were detained at various locations in the town, subjected to inhumane conditions, including regular beatings, rape, torture and strenuous forced labour. A school in Grapska and the factory used by the Bosanka company that produced jams and juices in Doboj was used as a rape camp. Four different types of soldiers were present at the rape camps including the local Serb militia, the Yugoslav Army (JNA), "Martićevci" (RSK police forces based in Knin, led by Milan Martić) and members of the "White Eagles" paramilitary group.

=== Crimes ===
It has been documented within the UN investigations of Doboj, the incarceration of Bosnian and Croat women in a former Olympic stadium housing complex was the site of the mass rapes. Several thousand women of non-Serb origin were systematically raped and abused. Buses from in and around Belgrade brought men to the complex for the purpose of systematic raping of these women. The payment of money for this cruelty was part of the funding process by the various Serb para-military groups operating in the area. It was well known that these paramilitary groups were an extension of the JNA. Many women died at the camp in Doboj due to abuse.

=== Shelling ===
Following the takeover and ethnic cleansing of non-Serbs in Doboj by Bosnian Serb forces, the city was heavily shelled by the Army of the Republic of Bosnia and Herzegovina (ARBiH). This resulted in the deaths of 99 Serb civilians, leaving hundreds more seriously injured.

== Legal cases ==
=== ICTY convictions ===
In its verdicts, the International Criminal Tribunal for the former Yugoslavia (ICTY) found that the Serb forces were found guilty of persecution of Bosniaks (through the commission of torture, cruel treatment, inhumane acts, unlawful detention, the establishment and perpetuation of inhumane living conditions, the appropriation or plunder of property during and after attacks on non-Serb parts of the town, the imposition and maintenance of restrictive and discriminatory measures), murder, forced transfer, deportation and torture as a crime against humanity in the Doboj area.

Radovan Karadžić was convicted for crimes against humanity and war crimes across Bosnia, including Doboj. He was sentenced to a life in prison.

Biljana Plavšić and Momčilo Krajišnik, acting individually or in concert with others, planned, instigated, ordered, committed or otherwise aided and abetted the planning, preparation or execution of the destruction, in whole or in part, of the Bosniak and Bosnian Croat national, ethnical, racial or religious groups, as such, in several municipalities, including Doboj. Plavšić was sentenced to 11 and Krajišnik to 20 years in prison.

Stojan Župljanin, an ex-police commander who had operational control over the police forces responsible for the detention camps, and Mićo Stanišić, the ex-Minister of the Interior of Republika Srpska, both received 22 years in prison each. The judgement read:

The trial chamber was satisfied beyond reasonable doubt that both Stanišic and Zupljanin participated in a joint criminal enterprise (JCE) with the objective to permanently remove non-Serbs from the territory of a planned Serbian state

In 2023, the follow-up International Residual Mechanism for Criminal Tribunals sentenced Serbian State Security officers Jovica Stanišić and Franko Simatović for aiding and abetting the crime of murder, as a violation of the laws or customs of war and a crime against humanity, and the crimes of deportation, forcible transfer, and persecution, as crimes against humanity in Doboj, included them in a joint criminal enterprise, and sentenced them each to 15 years in prison. The Tribunal concluded:

[Stanišić and Simatović] shared the intent to further the common criminal plan to forcibly and permanently remove the majority of non-Serbs from large areas of Croatia and Bosnia and Herzegovina.

It also concluded:

The Trial Chamber noted evidence that during the operation in Doboj, forces under Radojica Božović’s command acted in coordination with the JNA, which was under the authority of Slobodan Milošević at that time. Evidence considered by the Trial Chamber also shows that Milovan Stanković operated under JNA command, while holding a position of the Commander of the Doboj Territorial Defence and a JNA/Army of the Republika Srpska (“VRS”) commander. The Appeals Chamber therefore considers that the crimes of forcible transfer and persecution committed by the JNA, forces under Radojica Božović’s command, as well as forces under Milovan Stanković’s command during the takeover of Doboj can be attributed to Slobodan Milošević, a joint criminal enterprise member.

=== Other ===
On 26 September 1997, Nikola Jorgić was found guilty by the Düsseldorf Oberlandesgericht (Higher Regional Court) on 11 counts of genocide involving the murder of 30 persons in the Doboj region, making it the first Bosnian Genocide prosecution. However, ICTY ruled out that genocide did not occur. Jorgić's appeal was rejected by the German Bundesgerichtshof (Federal Supreme Court) on 30 April 1999. The Oberlandesgericht found that Jorgić, a Bosnian Serb, had been the leader of a paramilitary group in the Doboj region that had taken part in acts of terror against the local Bosniak population carried out with the backing of the Serb leaders and intended to contribute to their policy of "ethnic cleansing".

== See also ==
- Srebrenica massacre
- Foča ethnic cleansing
- List of Bosnian genocide prosecutions
- List of massacres of Bosniaks
- Bosnian genocide
