= Miko (surname) =

Miko is a surname. Notable people with this surname include:

- Izabella Miko (Izabella Anna Mikołajczak), Polish actress, dancer, producer, and environmental activist
- József Mikó, Hungarian cinematographer
- Ladislav Miko, Czech environmental expert and politician
- William Miko, Zambian artist

== See also ==
- Miko (disambiguation)
- Miko (name)
- Mito (name)
