= Bosanski Šamac ethnic cleansing =

Ethnic cleansing

- Part of the Bosnian genocide
- Šamac municipality
- Location: Bosanski Šamac, Serb-occupied Bosnia and Herzegovina
- Date: 17 April–November 1992
- Target: Bosniaks; Bosnian Croats
- Attack type: Murder, ethnic cleansing, forced transfer
- Deaths: ~126 civilians
- Perpetrators: Bosnian Serb forces, JNA, Special Operations Unit
- Motive: Greater Serbia, Islamophobia, Anti-Croat sentiment

The Bosanski Šamac ethnic cleansing refers to war crimes, including murder, looting, ethnic cleansing and persecution committed against Bosniaks and Croats in the Bosanski Šamac area by the Yugoslav People's Army and Serb paramilitary units from 17 April until November 1992 during the Bosnian war. The area was later incorporated into the newly formed proto-state Republika Srpska.

Out of over 17,000 Bosniaks and Croats recorded in the municipality, only around 300 remained after the war in 1995. According to the Research and Documentation Center (IDC), 639 people died or went missing in the municipality during the war, of which 126 were civilians. The UN-backed International Criminal Tribunal for the former Yugoslavia (ICTY) classified it as a crime against humanity and sentenced nine Serb officials, including Jovica Stanišić and Franko Simatović, who served in the State Security Service (SDB) within the Ministry of Internal Affairs of Serbia, making it the only case in the history of the tribunal for which officials from Serbia were sentenced for crimes in Bosnia and Herzegovina.

== Description ==
Bosanski Šamac was a strategically important municipality for the Bosnian Serb forces, who wanted to include it into its "Posavina Corridor" that would link Serb-coveted territories in Croatia and Bosnia and Herzegovina with Serbia. According to the 1991 census, the Bosanski Šamac municipality enumerated 32,960 people, of which 44.7% were Croats, 41.3% Serbs and 6.8% Bosniaks. The Serb Autonomous Regions for Northern Bosnia and Semberija and Majevica were proclaimed. The Bosnian Serb forces, led by Radovan Karadžić, established a Crisis Staffs and a "Variant A or B" protocol; to seize power in areas in which Serbs were in a majority (Variant A), or to form separate parallel institutions where they were a minority (Variant B).

Prior to the start of the Bosnian War, incidents of shootings, grenade explosions, sabotage and violence escalated in Bosanski Šamac. In Autumn 1991 and March 1992, in the context of the Croatian War of Independence, Croatian paramilitary attacked Yugoslav People's Army (JNA) barracks around Bosanski Šamac. In March 1992, several Serbs were sent to Ilok, Croatia, to train in a military camp run by Serbia.

On 17 April 1992, Serb paramilitary attacked Bosanski Šamac and took control of it without any significant resistance. They immediately started confiscating weapons from local populace. The newly established Crisis Staff of Republika Srpska issued several orders, including a ban on political activities and a ban of gathering more than three non-Serbs on public places. Non-Serbs had to wear white armbands. Serb police and paramilitary started arresting Bosniaks and Croats and sending them to unlawful detention facilities. There they were beaten and tortured with rifles, metal bars, baseball bats, metal chains, police batons, and chair legs. Some endured sexual assaults. Bosniak and Croat prisoners were given forced labor for which they were not paid, and were under armed supervision. Looting and plunder was limited exclusively to property owned by non-Serbs. Non-Serbs were forcibly transferred to Croatia or other parts of Bosnia, away from Bosanski Šamac.

Numerous non-Serb men aged between 18 and 60 were rounded up and summarily executed by local Serb forces and paramilitary forces from Serbia. At least 16 civilians were killed when 50 prisoners were rounded up in an internment camp by the Grey Wolves paramilitary group led by Slobodan Miljković.

== Legal prosecution ==
The UN-backed International Criminal Tribunal for the former Yugoslavia (ICTY) sentenced nine Serb officials for war crimes in Bosanski Šamac. Blagoje Simić was sentenced for crimes against humanity for persecutions based upon unlawful arrest and detention, cruel and inhumane treatment, forced labour, unlawful confinement under inhumane conditions, and deportation and forcible transfer. He was sentenced to 15 years in prison. His case was tried with Miroslav Tadić, who was sentenced to 8 years, and Simo Zarić, who was sentenced to 6 years in prison. Slobodan Miljković was indicted, but died before he could be arrested.

Stevan Todorović pleaded guilty for persecutions and was sentenced to 10 years in prison. Milan Simić also pleaded guilty, for torture as a crime against humanity, and was sentenced to five years in prison. Stojan Župljanin and Mićo Stanišić were sentenced to 22 years in prison, including for crimes of persecution, torture, unlawful detention, forcible transfer and deportation, and wanton destruction of towns and villages.

In 2021, the follow-up International Residual Mechanism for Criminal Tribunals sentenced Jovica Stanišić and Franko Simatović, former intelligence officers who served in the State Security Service (SDB) within the Ministry of Internal Affairs of Serbia, for aiding and abetting murder, deportation, forcible transfer and persecution as crimes against humanity perpetrated by their paramilitary groups, and sentenced them to 12 years in prison; making it the only conviction in the history of the tribunal in which officials from Serbia were sentenced for crimes in Bosnia and Herzegovina. The 2023 appeal increased Stanišić's and Simatović's sentence to 15 years, and included them in a joint criminal enterprise.
