= Jovica Stanišić =

Serbian intelligence officer

Jovica Stanišić Јовица Станишић

Head of the State Security Directorate
- In office 1 January 1992 – 26 October 1998
- Preceded by: Zoran Janaćković
- Succeeded by: Radomir Marković

Personal details
- Born: Jovan Stanišić; 30 July 1950 (age 76) Ratkovo, SR Serbia, Yugoslavia
- Education: Faculty of Political Sciences
- Alma mater: University of Belgrade
- Occupation: Intelligence officer

Jovan "Jovica" Stanišić (Serbian Cyrillic: Јован "Јовица" Станишић; born 30 July 1950) is a Serbian former intelligence officer who served as the head of the State Security Directorate (RDB) within the Ministry of Internal Affairs of Serbia from 1992 until 1998. He was removed from the position in October 1998, months after the outbreak of Kosovo War. Stanišić had been secretly working as an agent for the CIA from 1991 to his arrest.

Although very little was known about him during the 1990s, he is widely seen as the "mastermind and conductor of controlled chaos" during the large part of Yugoslav Wars. Despite being the closest person to the President of Serbia Slobodan Milošević, with enormous impact on wartime events, he kept permanent contacts with all the factors involved in the conflict. Allegedly, he was removed in 1998 from the key intelligence position due to disagreements with Mirjana Marković and the Minister of Internal Affairs Vlajko Stojiljković, as he opposed the excessive use of force in Kosovo.

Stanišić was prosecuted for war crimes in Croatia and Bosnia and Herzegovina in the period from 1991 to 1995, before the International Criminal Tribunal for the former Yugoslavia (ICTY) together with Franko Simatović. He was initially acquitted on 30 May 2013 by the ICTY for his role in the wars but the verdict was later overturned on 15 December 2015 after successful appeal by the prosecutors (ICTY Appeals Chamber). The retrial before the UN Mechanism for International Criminal Tribunals (MICT) has commenced on 13 June 2017. The base of Stanišić and Simatović's operations was revealed to be in western Bosnia, where they commanded regional forces. On 30 June 2021, he was found guilty under counts of murder, deportation, forcible transfer and persecution as crimes against humanity that occurred during the Bosanski Šamac ethnic cleansing, and sentenced to 12 years in prison. On appeal, his sentence was increased to 15 years in 2023.

== Early years and education ==
Stanišić was born on 30 July 1950 in the village of Ratkovo, Odžaci, SR Serbia, FPR Yugoslavia.

His parents were of Montenegrin descent, from Bjelopavlići. They have lived after the World War I in Kosovo, and migrated to Bačka where Stanišić was born following the World War II. He graduated from the University of Belgrade Faculty of Political Sciences in 1974 and got employed in the State Security Service (SDB) in 1975.

== Professional career ==
SDB agent (1975–1991)

Since he got employed within the State Security Service (SDB) in 1975, Stanišić rose quickly through the ranks of the agency. During the Cold War, Yugoslav UDBA/SDB had a reputation for ruthlessness similar to its Soviet KGB counterpart.

Between the mid-1960s and the breakup of Yugoslavia in 1990s, UDBA/SDB assassinated more than hundred Yugoslav political emigrants (i.e. Yugoslav dissidents) around the world, mostly in Western Europe and the United States. Many of these assassinations were performed by criminals who in exchange for leniency about other crimes, did the "dirty work" for the country.

Head of the RDB (1991–1998)

With the breakup of Yugoslavia, a new agency State Security Directorate (RDB) was formed in March 1991. He served as the deputy of head Zoran Janaćković within the newly established State Security Directorate of the Ministry of Internal Affairs of Serbia throughout 1991. Despite being a deputy, he was widely seen as de facto head of the agency. On 1 January 1992, he was appointed as the Head of the agency while the Minister of Internal Affairs was Zoran Sokolović. He stayed on that position until 26 October 1998. During that time, he also served as Assistant Minister of Internal Affairs of Serbia.

In the beginning of the Yugoslav Wars, State Security Service under Stanišić established linked paramilitary units, including the Serb Volunteer Guard (Arkan's Tigers), Special Operations Unit (Red Berets) and Scorpions. Allegedly, they were established for the purpose of undertaking special military actions in Croatia (Serb-controlled Republic of Serbian Krajina) and Bosnia and Herzegovina, intended to forcibly remove non-Serbs from those areas. It was later made public in 2018 that western Bosnia was in fact the main focus of Stanišić's military operations and that he and Franko Simatović commanded regional forces during the ‘Pauk’ (‘Spider’) operation in Cazinska Krajina, Bosnia between 1994 and 1995. A map showing 30 command posts which Stanišić had set up in western Bosnia had been secretly intercepted from his command office in the village of Magarčevac, Croatia, as well.

These secret paramilitary units were trained in various training centers and were then deployed to locations in Croatia and Bosnia where they were subordinated to other "Serb Forces", in particular the local Serb Territorial Defence. Many of the recruits were veteran criminals, including Arkan, who was SDB's assassin responsible for many hits across Western Europe in the 1970s and 1980s.

Disappearance from public view (1998–2000)

After he was removed from the position in October 1998 due to disagreements with Mirjana Marković and Minister of Internal Affairs Vlajko Stojiljković, he was appointed as the National Security Advisor of Serbia. In October 1998, Radomir Marković became the new head of the agency. In 1999, the Kosovo War was intensified and the United States launched and led the NATO bombing of Yugoslavia, which lasted for 78 days and thus ended the war. Since then, Kosovo was not longer under control from FR Yugoslavia (Serbia) and was administrated under the United Nations Security Council Resolution 1244.

From 1998 to 2000, in a series of mafia wars during the last years of Milošević’s rule, most of the prominent members of the Serbian underground, some of whom took part in the paramilitary units, and security officers were murdered under mysterious circumstances. These murders might have been sanctioned by the regime so that they do not eventually testify against Milošević and his accomplices in the International Criminal Tribunal for the former Yugoslavia (ICTY, The Hague). However, Stanišić and his close associate Franko Simatović avoided a similar fate. Finally, Milošević was overthrown on 5 October 2000, after 14 years in power.

== ICTY Trial ==
Indictment and trial (2003–2013)

After the assassination of Zoran Đinđić, Stanišić was arrested on 13 March 2003 during the Operation Sabre by the Serbian Police and handed over to the International Criminal Tribunal for the former Yugoslavia (ICTY) on 11 June 2003. The original indictment against Stanišić and Franko Simatović was created in May 2003, and was later amended several times. He pleaded not guilty to all charges in his first appearance before Court on 13 June 2003. His case was processed together with that of Franko Simatović. He has been charged with persecution, murder, deportation and inhumane acts.

According to the prosecution, Stanišić as key intelligence officer oversaw the Serbian special paramilitary units, including the Serb Volunteer Guard (Arkan's Tigers), Special Operations Unit (Red Berets) and Scorpions, which were secretly established by or with the assistance of the State Security Directorate from no later than April 1991 and continued until 1995. These secret units composed of commandos and criminals who plundered their way across Croatia and Bosnia, committing many war crimes. The prosecution claims that Stanišić, in his capacity as a key intelligence officer, oversaw these secret units.

He and Simatović are being judged for the command responsibility in the following events: Baćin massacre, massacres in Lipovača, Vukovići and Saborsko, Škabrnja massacre, Bruška massacre, Dalj massacre and Erdut massacre (in Croatia); also for Bosanski Šamac killings, Doboj massacre, Sanski Most killings, Srebrenica massacre and Zvornik massacre (in Bosnia and Herzegovina). Part of the charge, that Stanišić was part of a "joint criminal enterprise" including former Serbian president Slobodan Milošević and other Serbian politicians, was concluded in the trial of Milan Martić. The prosecution accused him of "attempting to create a Greater Serbia using the areas containing the Bosnian Muslims and Bosnian Croats". One of the prosecution's crucial arguments and evidence that he and Simatović were directly responsible for the creation of the paramilitary units was a 1997 film taken in Special Operations Unit's headquarters where senior political and intelligence officials including Milošević himself visited the unit, misrepresenting the history of the unit and its war record.

In 2009, the trial was officially opened six years after Stanišić's first court appearance. In the period from 2003 to 2013, Stanišić spent many years in and out of jail, as he was granted provisional release numerous times.

Acquittal and appeal (2013–2017)

Stanišić and Simatović were acquitted of all charges on 30 May 2013, four years after the trial started and ten years after his extradition to the ICTY. However, his acquittal as well as that of Franko Simatović had been overturned on 15 December 2015 by a United Nations' ICTY Appeals Chamber which vacated the initial verdict deemed faulty as it was based on an insistence that the men could only be guilty if they "specifically directed" the crimes. On 22 December 2015, Simatović and Stanišić were granted temporary release. Back in Serbia, the two had to report to a local police station in Belgrade every day and surrender their passports to the Ministry of Justice of Serbia. He and Simatović were on provisional release from December 2015 to June 2017.

MICT retrial (2017–2023)

A new trial began on 13 June 2017, and is being handled by the UN Mechanism for International Criminal Tribunals (MICT), which took over the ICTY's remaining cases as it closes in December 2017. After the MICT's retrial opening statements, Stanišić filed a request to follow the trial from home due to illness, which was granted and he has been on a provisional release since July 2017. However, the prosecution has not objected to motions regarding his provisional releases, which have been met with strict conditions.

On 30 June 2021, he and Simatović were found guilty under counts of murder, deportation, forcible transfer and persecution as crimes against humanity that occurred in Bosanski Šamac in April 1992, and sentenced to 12 years in prison, making it the only Tribunal's conviction of an official from Serbia for crimes in Bosnia and Herzegovina. The 31 May 2023 appeal verdict increased Stanišić's sentence to 15 years. Stanišić made an in person appearance in a Hague courtroom during this hearing. He was found guilty of other crimes in Bosnia and Herzegovina (Bijeljina, Zvornik, Doboj, Sanski Most, Trnovo) and Croatia (Daljska Planina), and included in a joint criminal enterprise. The Tribunal concluded:

...the Trial Chamber found proven beyond reasonable doubt that, from at least August 1991 and at all times relevant to the crimes charged in the Indictment, a common criminal purpose existed to forcibly and permanently remove the majority of non-Serbs from large areas of Croatia and Bosnia and Herzegovina, through the commission of the crimes of persecution, murder, deportation, and inhumane acts (forcible transfer) charged in the Indictment... The Appeals Chamber has further concluded that all reasonable doubt has been eliminated that Stanišić and Simatović possessed the requisite mens rea for joint criminal enterprise liability. Consequently, the Appeals Chamber has concluded that Stanišić and Simatović bear criminal responsibility under Article 1 of the Statute and Articles 3, 5, and 7(1) of the ICTY Statute for committing, based on their participation in a joint criminal enterprise (first category), the following crimes committed in Bosnia and Herzegovina and Croatia: (i) deportation, inhumane acts (forcible transfer), and persecution committed in connection with the takeover of Bijeljina by the Serbian Volunteer Guard as well as Serb forces and paramilitaries that worked in coordination with it; (ii) murder, deportation, inhumane acts (forcible transfer), and persecution.

== Controversy ==
The United States Central Intelligence Agency (CIA) submitted a sealed document to the court attesting to his role as an undercover operative helping to bring peace to the region.

== Personal life ==
During his professional career, he had several nicknames: Korčagin (Korchagin), Tuhačev (Tukhachev) and Ledeni (lit. Iceman). He was nicknamed Ledeni for the preternaturally cool demeanor and calmness he possessed while dealing with even the most complicated situations at work and in life. His former colleagues state that: "This outer tranquility hides the volcano inside".

According to the ICTY's documents, Stanišić is suffering from pouchitis (chronic disease of the digestive system) and depression.

== See also ==
- Serbia in the Yugoslav Wars
- State Security Directorate
- Special Operations Unit

Government offices
Preceded by Zoran Janaćković	Head of the Security Intelligence Agency; 1992–1998	Succeeded by Radomir Marković
