= University of Theatre and Film Arts in Budapest =

Art school in Budapest, Hungary

Coordinates: 47°29′43″N 19°03′58″E

University of Theatre and Film Arts
- Színház- és Filmművészeti Egyetem (Hungarian)
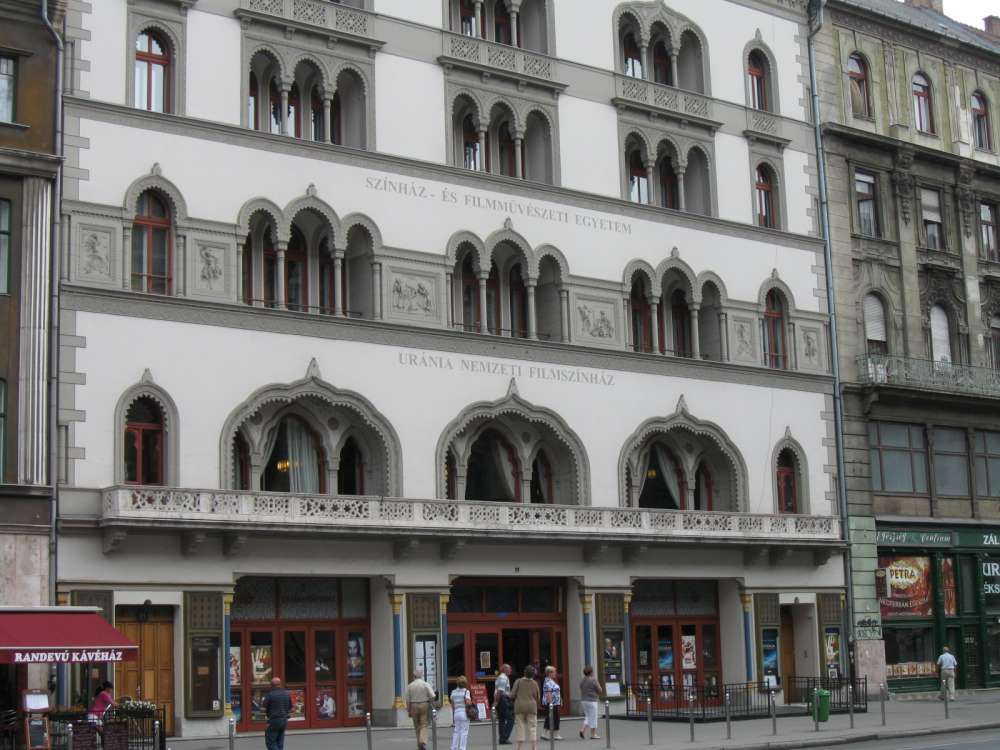
- Other names: Academy of Drama and Film in Budapest
- Type: Public
- Established: 1865
- Rector: Zoltán Rátóti (2022−)
- Location: Budapest, Hungary
- Campus: Urban
- Website: www.szfe.hu

The Academy of Drama and Film in Budapest (Hungarian: Színház- és Filmművészeti Egyetem, SZFE) is an educational institution founded in 1865 in Budapest, Hungary. It became a university in 2000 and the name was changed to University of Theatre and Film Arts.

== History ==
On 31 August 2020, the university's management resigned in protest at the imposition of a government-appointed board of trustees which they saw as limiting the university's autonomous status. A group of students took over the school building in protest and barricaded themselves inside. Several artists signed an open letter in defense of the autonomy of the school.

In 2021, the University announced that its film institute would operate under the name Zsigmond Vilmos Institute for Motion Picture, housed in a building on Szentkirályi Street within the former Duna Television headquarters in Buda. Its theater institute, renamed the Sinkovits Imre Institute for the Theatrical Arts, and theoretical studies institute, renamed the Antal Németh Institute of Drama Theory, are housed in the former Károlyi Palace on Szentkirályi Street and Rákóczi Street.

== Notable alumni ==
=== Directors ===
- István Szabó – Academy Award-winning (1981) (also nominated in 1963, 1980, 1985 and 1988), BAFTA Award–winning (1985) and Golden Globe Award–nominee (1985 and 1988) director
- Miklós Jancsó – Cannes Film Festival Award-winning (1972) and Kossuth Prize–winning director (1973, 2006)
- Béla Tarr – Kossuth Prize (2003) and Silver Bear Grand Jury Prize–winning director (2011)
- Kristóf Deák – Academy Award–winning director (2016)
- Ildikó Enyedi – Academy Award–nominee (2017) and Golden Bear-winning director (2017)
- Dénes Nagy – Silver Bear–winning director (2021)
- Kornél Mundruczó – Prix Un Certain Regard–winner director (2014)
- László Lugossy – Silver Bear Grand Jury Prize–winning director (1985)
- Károly Makk – Kossuth Prize–winning director (1973)
- Nimród Antal – director
- Gábor Bódy – director

=== Cinematographers ===
- Vilmos Zsigmond – Academy Award–winning (1977) (also nominated in 1978, 1984 and 2006), BAFTA Award-winning (1979) (also nominated in 1972 for three different films and 1978) and Emmy Award–winning (1993) (also nominated in 2002) cinematographer; Pierre Angénieux Excellens in Cinematography (2014)
- László Kovács – cinematographer
- Lóránt Lukács – cinematographer
- József Mikó – cinematographer
- Lajos Koltai – Kossuth Prize–winning and Academy Award-nominee (2001) cinematographer
- Mátyás Erdély – Kossuth Prize–winning cinematographer (2016)
- Marcell Rév – Emmy Award–winning (2022) (also nominated in 2021) cinematographer

=== Actors ===
- Mari Törőcsik – Cannes Film Festival (1976) and three–time Kossuth Prize–winning actress (1973, 1999 and 2019)
- Alexandra Borbély – European Film Award-winning actress (2017)
- Géza Röhrig – Kossuth Prize–winning actor (2016)
- Hilda Gobbi – Kossuth Prize–winning actress (1949)
- Károly Eperjes – Kossuth Prize–winning actor (1999)
- Cecília Esztergályos – Kossuth Prize–winning actress (2018)
- Miklós Benedek - actor
- Imre Sinkovits - Kossuth Prize-winning actor who was named an "Actor of the Nation"
- Attila Lőte - actor

=== Editor ===
- Dávid Jancsó - Academy Award-nominated (2024) editor

=== Playwright ===
- Miklós László – playwright
