= Mitu (disambiguation) =

Mitú is the capital city of the Vaupés Department, Colombia.

Mitu may also refer to:

- Mitu (bird), a genus of curassows, native to South America
- Mitu (given name)
- Mitu (surname)
- Mitu, Iran, a village in Tamugheh Rural District, Saqqez County, Kurdistan Province, Iran
- Mitú (entertainment), Latino digital media company and digital content publisher
- The Truth (2008 TV series) (Chinese: 谜图; pinyin: mítú), a Singaporean TV series

== See also ==
- Mithu (disambiguation)
- Mittu (disambiguation)
- Mitsu (disambiguation)
