= Mitu (surname) =

Mitu is the surname of the following notable people:

- Andreea Mitu (born 1991), Romanian tennis player
- Anna Mitus, British-American medical researcher
- Cédric Mitu (born 1995), Congolese football forward
- Dumitru Mitu (born 1975), Romanian former footballer
- Gogea Mitu (1914–1936), Romanian boxer
- Mahmuda Mitu, Bangladeshi politician and physician
- Marius Mitu (born 1976), Romanian footballer
- Nasreen Sultana Mitu (born 1987), Bangladeshi political cartoonist and science educator
- Petre Mitu (born 1977), Romanian rugby union player
- Radu Mîțu (born 1994), Moldovan football goalkeeper
- Zahara Mitu, Bangladeshi film actress and presenter

== See also ==
- Mitu (disambiguation)
- Mito (name)
