= Thomas Peebles =

Thomas Peebles may refer to:

- Thomas Peebles (glazier), Scottish craftsman who worked for the royal palaces
- Thomas Peebles (American football) (1857–1938), first college football head coach for the University of Minnesota in 1883
- Thomas C. Peebles (1921–2010), American physician
