= Mikow =

Mikow may refer to:

- Mików, a village in Podkarpackie Voivodeship, Poland
- Mikow, the local Upper Sorbian name for Mücka, a village in Saxony, Germany

== See also ==
- Miko (disambiguation)
