= Mittu =

Mittu may refer to,

- Mittu language, Sudan (extinct)

== See also ==
- Mittu Khedi, a village in Madhya Pradesh, India
- Mitu (disambiguation)
- Mithu (disambiguation)
- Mitsu (disambiguation)
