= Mico =

Mico may refer to:

== People ==
- MICO (singer), Canadian singer-songwriter
- Mićo Janić (born 1979), Croatian sprint canoer
- Mićo Ljubibratić (1839–1889), Serbian revolutionary
- Mico Palanca (1978–2019), Filipino actor
- Mićo Smiljanić (born 1974), Serbian/Montenegrin footballer
- Mićo Stanišić (born 1954), Bosnian Serb politician
- Mićo Vranješ (born 1975), Serbian footballer
- Mieko Hirota (born 1947), Japanese singer
- Mitso Asen of Bulgaria (fl. 1256–1278), Bulgarian tsar
- Irma Mico (1914–2022), French resistance fighter
- Richard Mico (1590–1661), English composer

== Other uses ==
- MICO (Motor Industries Company), a former name of Bosch India
- Mico (band), Canadian rock band
- Mico (genus), genus of monkey
- Mico, Texas
- Mico (Copilot assistant), a virtual assistant for use with the Microsoft Copilot chatbot
- Mico University College, Jamaica

== See also ==
- Miko (disambiguation)
