= Mito (name) =

Mito, Mit'o and Mitó is a nickname and surname. Mito is a Georgian and Slovene masculine diminutive form of the names Dimitrij, Demetre and Dimitri. Mito is a Japanese name. Mitó is a short form of the feminine Portuguese blended name Maria Antonia. Mit'o is a diminutive form of the Bulgarian masculine given name Dimitar.

== Nickname ==
- Mito Croes, nickname of Antonito Gordiano Croes (1946–2016), Aruban politician
- Mito Elias, nickname of Fernando Hamilton Barbosa Elias, (born 1965), Cape Verdean artist, plastic artist and a poet

== Japanese name ==
- Mito Isaka (born 1976), Japanese football player
- Mito Kakizawa (born 1971), Japanese politician
- Mito Natsume (born 1990), Japanese model, presenter, and singer,
- Mito Yorifusa, nickname of Tokugawa Yorifusa (1603–1661), Japanese daimyō
- Kōzō Mito (born 1979), Japanese voice actor
- Masashi Mito (born 1962), Japanese politician
- Mitsuko Mito (1919–1981), Japanese actress
- Satsue Mito (1914–2012), Japanese school teacher and primate researcher

== See also ==
- Mito (disambiguation)
- Miko (name)
- Miko (surname)
- Milo (name)
- Mio (given name)
- Mita (name)
- Mitt (name)
- Mitu (surname)
- Jair Bolsonaro, nicknamed "El Mito"
