= Dalj massacre =

Killing of 56 or 57 Croats

Coordinates: 45.486132°N 18.983002°E

- Dalj on the map of Croatia
- Location: Dalj, Croatia
- Date: 1 August 1991—June 1992
- Target: Croatian police and Croatian National Guard prisoners of war, Croat civilians
- Attack type: Mass murder, ethnic cleansing
- Deaths: 56–57 (1 August 1991); Up to 135 or more killed by June 1992
- Perpetrators: SAO Eastern Slavonia, Baranja and Western Syrmia Territorial Defence Forces, supported by the Yugoslav People's Army and the Serb Volunteer Guard paramilitaries

The Dalj massacre was the killing of Croats in Dalj, Croatia from 1 August 1991 until June 1992, during the Croatian War of Independence. In addition to civilian victims, the figure includes 20 Croatian policemen, 15 Croatian National Guard (Zbor narodne garde – ZNG) troops and four civil defencemen who had been defending the police station and water supply building in the village on 1 August 1991. While some of the policemen and the ZNG troops died in combat, those who surrendered were killed after they became prisoners of war. They tried to fight off an attack by the Croatian Serb SAO Eastern Slavonia, Baranja and Western Syrmia (SAO SBWS) Territorial Defence Forces, supported by the Yugoslav People's Army (Jugoslovenska Narodna Armija – JNA) and the Serb Volunteer Guard paramilitaries. The SAO SBWS was declared an autonomous territory in eastern Croatia following the Battle of Borovo Selo just to the south of Dalj.

After the attack on 1 August 1991, the non-Serb civilian population in the village and the surrounding area was persecuted up to June 1992. They were forced to flee their homes, as they would have been imprisoned, physically abused or killed if they did not. After the war, the International Criminal Tribunal for the former Yugoslavia (ICTY) charged high-ranking SAO SBWS and Serbian officials, including Slobodan Milošević and Goran Hadžić, with war crimes committed in Dalj. Two Serbian State Security officials, Jovica Stanišić and Franko Simatović, were convicted for a murder in Daljska Planina in June 1992. The killings were extensively covered by German media leading to forming of a public opinion in support of Croatia. By the end of 1991, Germany adopted support for diplomatic recognition of Croatia as its policy and duty.

== Background ==
In 1990, following the electoral defeat of the government of the Socialist Republic of Croatia, ethnic tensions in the republic worsened. The Yugoslav People's Army (Jugoslovenska Narodna Armija – JNA) confiscated Croatia's Territorial Defence (Teritorijalna obrana – TO) weapons to minimize the possibility of resistance following the elections. On 17 August, the tensions escalated into an open revolt of the Croatian Serbs, centred on the predominantly Serb-populated areas of the Dalmatian hinterland around Knin, parts of the Lika, Kordun, Banovina and eastern Croatia. They established a Serbian National Council in July 1990 to coordinate opposition to Croatian President Franjo Tuđman's policy of pursuing independence for Croatia. Milan Babić, a dentist from the southern town of Knin, was elected president. Knin's police chief, Milan Martić, established paramilitary militias. The two men eventually became the political and military leaders of the SAO Krajina, a self-declared state incorporating the Serb-inhabited areas of Croatia. In March 1991, the SAO Krajina authorities backed by the Serbian government started to consolidate control over Serb-populated areas of Croatia. The move resulted in a bloodless skirmish in Pakrac and the first fatalities in the Plitvice Lakes incident. By early May, the conflict also escalated in the region of eastern Slavonia, culminating in the Battle of Borovo Selo, just to the south of the village of Dalj. On 25–26 June, Croatian Serbs in the eastern Slavonia established the SAO Eastern Slavonia, Baranja and Western Syrmia (SAO SBWS), declaring it an autonomous political entity.

In the beginning of 1991, Croatia had no regular army and in an effort to bolster its defence, it doubled the number of police personnel to about 20,000. The most effective part of the force was the 3,000-strong special police deployed in twelve battalions adopting military organisation. In addition there were 9,000–10,000 regionally organised reserve police. The reserve police was set up in 16 battalions and 10 companies, but they lacked weapons. By July, the Croatian National Guard (Zbor narodne garde – ZNG) was established, absorbing a part of the special police force reorganised into four professional brigades, and police reserve force of 40,000 ZNG troops. The reserve units did not possess sufficient heavy or small arms to arm all of their personnel.

== Timeline ==
Map of eastern Slavonia area between Osijek and Vukovar (Modern county lines provided for reference)

The general area of the villages of Dalj, Erdut and Aljmaš was targeted by an artillery bombardment between 3:00 a.m. and 4:30 a.m. on 1 August 1991. Croatian sources indicate that the artillery fire was coming from units assigned to the JNA 51st Mechanised Brigade deployed on the left bank of the Danube River, on the territory of Serbia, as well as the Croatian Serb TO. The JNA report on the events prepared for Croatian authorities denies that the JNA artillery took part in the bombardment, and indicates a somewhat later time of the initial fighting, placing it at 4:10 a.m. Witness testimony given at the International Criminal Tribunal for the former Yugoslavia (ICTY) trial of Slobodan Milošević supports the timeline placing the initial combat at 3:00 a.m.

After the artillery fire ceased, the Croatian Serb TO, supported by the Serb Volunteer Guard (SVG) led by Željko Ražnatović, began an infantry assault of Dalj, organised in three groups, from its base in Borovo Selo. One of the groups attacked the police station in Dalj, the second assaulted ZNG positions around water supply building in the village, while the third group remained in reserve. The heaviest fighting took place around the Dalj police station defended by the Croatian police and ZNG personnel. At 6:20 a.m., the Croatian police requested assistance from Osijek police administration and the JNA in terminating the TO attack, citing considerable casualties. The JNA decided to intervene and was ordered to Dalj at 6:50 a.m. The JNA reported receiving gunfire from the ZNG 1st Company of the 1st Battalion of the 3rd Guards Brigade in Erdut as it moved towards 15 kilometres (9.3 miles) of road between Bogojevo and Dalj and returning fire before proceeding to Dalj. Conversely, the ICTY witness of the event claimed the JNA fired against civilian homes in Erdut unprovoked. The JNA units reached the Dalj police station at 9:30 a.m.

JNA and Croatian sources disagree on events immediately following arrival of the JNA in Dalj. While the JNA claimed it requested a cessation of the fire only to be refused by the defenders of the police station, Croatian sources claim the JNA demanded the unconditional surrender of the police and the ZNG, and were refused by the Croatian force. Both versions agree that the combat resumed until approximately 10 a.m., when three tank main gun rounds, fired by the JNA, hit the police station. While the JNA reported there were no Croatian policemen or ZNG troops captured alive, contradicting its own report stating that the Croatian force located outside the police station accepted cessation of hostilities, the Croatian sources claim that those who surrendered were killed after their capture. Overall, 39 were killed in the fighting for the police station in Dalj—20 policemen, 15 ZNG troops and four civil defencemen.

Refugees were evacuated to Osijek by Drava River barges

The same day, several non-Serb civilians were killed in Dalj. In a subsequent round of negotiations with Croatian authorities, the SAO SBWS representatives reported 56 or 57 Croats were killed in Dalj on 1 August. Twenty-five bodies of the victims, including two civilians, were transferred to ZNG-held Osijek. Post-mortem examinations indicated some of the victims were beaten and then executed.

The Croat population felt intimidated and forced to leave Dalj, as the events of 1 August marked the beginning of a series of attacks against the Croat civilian population in ethnically mixed areas. The bulk of the refugees travelled to Aljmaš, and then were taken by boats and barges along the Drava River to Osijek. Persecution of the non-Serb population of Dalj and other nearby villages started in the immediate aftermath of the attack. The persecution included beatings, arbitrary arrests and war rape. The TO units arrested a number of Croat civilians and imprisoned them in Dalj. On 21 September, eleven prisoners were killed by the TO personnel led by Ražnatović, and buried in a mass grave in the village of Ćelije. A further 28 civilians held in Dalj detention facility were tortured and killed by the TO and Ražnatović on 4 October. The bodies of the victims were then dumped in the Danube River. At least 135 Croat and non-Serb civilians were killed in this region by May 1992.

In one case, the Serbian Volunteer Guard and the Serbian National Security had beaten and killed Marija Senaši on 3 June 1992.

After the JNA captured Vukovar, it transferred a large number of the inhabitants of the city to the detention facility in Dalj on 20 November. The transfer occurred on the basis of a request by Goran Hadžić, political leader of the SAO SBWS. Those suspected of involvement in the fighting were interrogated and tortured, and at least 35 were executed.

== Aftermath ==
The SAO Krajina was renamed the Republic of Serbian Krajina (RSK) on 19 December, and the SAO SBWS formally joined the RSK on 26 February 1992. After the merger, Hadžić, who had been appointed president of the SAO SBWS on 25 September 1991, assumed the role of the president of the RSK. The events of 1 August 1991 were extensively covered by German media at the time, leading to a public outcry over the massacre. Germany subsequently advocated quick recognition of Croatia, as a means to stop further violence. By late 1991, Germany presented its decision to recognize Croatia as its policy and duty, lobbying the European Economic Community (EEC) diplomats. On 19 December, the German government decided to grant diplomatic recognition to Croatia as the first EEC member state to do so.

In 2013, the Dalj police station was awarded the Order of Nikola Šubić Zrinski for heroism. A memorial to the 39 police officers, ZNG troops and civil defencemen killed in Dalj on 1 August 1991 was unveiled at the station on the 22nd anniversary of their death. On 26 November 2013, a memorial to the killed civilians was completed in Dalj.

== War crimes trials ==
Human Rights Watch alleged war crimes in Dalj consisting of summary executions, enforced disappearances, indiscriminate and disproportionate attacks against civilians and civilian targets, forced displacement, and robbery.

Slobodan Milošević, President of Serbia in 1991, and Hadžić were charged by the International Criminal Tribunal for the former Yugoslavia (ICTY) at The Hague for war crimes, including ordering of the murder, extermination, imprisonment, deportation and torture of non-Serbs in Dalj through the paramilitaries. Milošević died in 2006, four years after his ICTY trial started, before a verdict was reached. Hadžić also died before his verdict was reached, in 2016.

The ICTY also charged Jovica Stanišić, head of the State Security Service run by Serbia's Ministry of Internal Affairs, and Franko Simatović, head of the Special Operations Unit of the State Security Service, with war crimes. The charges include complicity in the torture of a group of seven non-Serb civilians, including two arrested in Dalj on 11 November 1991. Five of those arrested were killed by the SVG paramilitaries in Erdut and buried in a mass grave in the village of Ćelije. Stanišić and Simatović were charged with control and training of the SVG. The trial began in 2008, and resulted in acquittal of the two by the ICTY trial chamber on 30 May 2013. The ICTY prosecutor appealed the verdict. In 2023, the follow-up International Residual Mechanism for Criminal Tribunals sentenced Stanišić and Simatović for aiding and abetting murder and persecution (the case of Marija Senaši) as a crime against humanity in Daljska Planina in June 1992, as well as other crimes in Bosnia and Herzegovina, included them in a joint criminal enterprise, and sentenced them to 15 years.

In 2010, the commanding officer of the JNA 51st Motorised Brigade, Enes Taso, was charged with war crimes and crimes against humanity committed in Dalj in August–December 1991. Taso is charged with the deaths of two policemen in the JNA attack on the Dalj police station, nine prisoners of war captured in Dalj, eleven captured in Vukovar, and 90 non-Serb civilians. In May 2012, Croatian authorities in Osijek started a trial of two Croatian Serbs charged with war crimes against Croatian civilians, including the gang rape of a 20-year-old woman and forcing her parents and siblings to watch the rape. Both of them were convicted in September 2013 and sentenced to 12 years in prison. In 2013, the Croatian Veterans' Affairs Minister stated that Croatian authorities have filed 150 indictments for war crimes committed during the Dalj massacre and war crimes perpetrated in Dalj area during the war.

== See also ==
- Erdut massacre
- List of massacres in Croatia
