= Mithu =

Mithu is an Indian feminine given name. Notable people with the name include:

== Given name ==
- Mithu Alur (born 1943), Indian social worker
- Mithu Chakrabarty, Indian film and television actress
- Mithu Mukherjee (cricketer), former Indian cricketer
- Mithu Mukherjee (actress) (born 1953), former Indian actress in Bengali and Hindi cinema
- Mithu Sanyal (born 1971), German writer, essayist, and academic of Indian descent
- Mithu Sen (born 1971), Indian conceptual artist

== Nickname ==
- Mithali Raj (born 1982), Indian cricketer, nicknamed Mithu
  - Shabaash Mithu, a 2022 biographical film about her by Srijit Mukherjee
- Priyanka Chopra (born 1982), Indian actress and film producer, sometimes nicknamed as Mithu

== See also ==
- Mitu (disambiguation)
- Mittu (disambiguation)
- Mitsu (disambiguation)
