= Miso (disambiguation) =

Miso is a traditional Japanese seasoning.

MISO or Miso may also refer to:

- MISO, short for Multiple Inputs, Single Output in system analysis
- Master Input, Slave Output, a data line in the Serial Peripheral Interface Bus
- Psychological operations (United States), also known as Military Information Support Operations in the U.S. military
- Midcontinent Independent System Operator, formerly known as Midwest Independent Transmission System Operator
- Misophonia, a neurological and hearing disorder characterized by fear or anxiety over certain sounds

== See also ==
- Misoprostol, a medication used to start labor, induce abortions, prevent and treat stomach ulcers, and treat postpartum bleeding
- Misso, a place in Estonia
- Mizo (disambiguation)
