= Ann Holloway =

American medical researcher

Ann Holloway was an American technician and member of the team that developed the measles vaccine and the polio vaccine. She was an associate of John Enders. Prior to her work on the measles vaccine, Holloway helped Enders develop the polio vaccine, for which Enders won the Nobel Prize.
