= Anna Mitus =

Medical researcher

Anna Mitus was a British-American medical researcher best known for her work on the measles vaccine as a part of the John Enders lab. Her most significant contribution to the research was her research on human amnion cells with Dr. Milan V. Milovanovic and how they supported the growth of the measles virus.

== Work on the measles vaccine ==
In 1957, with Dr. Milan V. Milovanovic and John Enders, Anna Mitus published their research “Cultivation of Measles Virus in Human Amnion Cells and in Developing Chick Embryo”. It was published in the journal of Experimental Biology and Medicine. In this research, the team was able to propagate the measles virus throughout 28 serial passages in human amnion cells. After the 28th passage in human amnion cells, the measles virus was then inoculated into chick embryos. This procedure was key because no viral activity inside of an egg had yet been detected at this point.

In 1959, Mitus was the lead author of an article entitled “Persistence of Measles Virus and Depression of Antibody Formation in Patients with Giant-Cell Pneumonia after Measles” published in The New England Journal of Medicine. She collaborated with John F. Enders, John M. Craig and Ann Holloway. The main conclusion from this paper was that in a proportion of giant-cell pneumonia cases, the measles virus was found to be an etiologic agent.

Overall, Mitus published at least 9 peer-reviewed journal articles on measles and the measles virus.

On October 1, 1961, John Enders wrote a letter to the editor of the New York Times in which he made sure that his six other lab members received just as much credit as him saying “To me it seems most desirable that the collaborative character of these investigations should be understood, not solely for personal reasons but because much of all modern medical research is conducted in this way.”

== Personal life ==
Mitus and her husband, Dr. W. Jack Mitus, immigrated to the United States in 1953. Anna Mitus became an Assistant Physician at Children's Hospital and Children's Cancer Research Center in Boston. Her husband worked as a professor at Tufts University. Together they had two daughters; her daughter (A. Jacquline Mitus) became a doctor.
