= Eliticide =

Killing of the leadership, the educated, and the clergy of a group

Eliticide or elitocide is "the killing of the leadership, the educated, and the clergy of a group." It is usually carried out during the beginning of a genocide to cripple a possible resistance movement against its perpetrators. Genocide scholars and sociologists frequently analyze the targeted destruction of a group's intelligentsia, leadership, and clergy not as a distinct legal category of crime, but as a crucial tactical phase designed to dismantle social cohesion and resistance during broader campaigns of mass violence. Eliticide occurred in the Armenian genocide, the German–Soviet occupation of Poland, the Cambodian genocide, the Isaaq genocide, Bolshevik Red Terror in Russia and instances of eliticide during the Yugoslav Wars. The term was first used in 1992 by British reporter Michael Nicholson to describe the Bijeljina massacre in Bosnia and Herzegovina: during the Bosnian War, local Serbs would point out prominent Bosniaks to be killed afterwards by Serb soldiers.

Eliticide is also carried out in cases of political revolutions supported by the people and targeted against the elites of the overthrown establishment, rather than being unpopular and indiscriminatory, as in the above cases of genocide. For example, during the French Revolution the revolutionaries executed members of the feudal Ancien Régime by the public use of the guillotine.

== See also ==
- Bibliography of genocide studies
- Classicide
- Politicide
- Great Purge
- Katyn massacre
- Kristallnacht
