= Franko Simatović =

Serbian intelligence officer

- Франко Симатовић
- Born: 1 April 1950 (age 76); Belgrade, PR Serbia, FPR Yugoslavia
- Military career
- Allegiance: SFR Yugoslavia; FR Yugoslavia
- Service years: 1978–2001
- Rank: Commander
- Nickname: Frenki
- Unit: Special Operations Unit (1991–1998)

Franko "Frenki" Simatović (Serbian Cyrillic: Франко "Френки" Симатовић; born 1 April 1950) is a Serbian former intelligence officer and commander of the elite special forces police unit Special Operations Unit (JSO) from 1991 to 1998.

Simatović is, along with former head of the State Security Directorate (RDB) Jovica Stanišić being prosecuted for war crimes in Croatia and Bosnia and Herzegovina in the period from 1991-1995, before the International Tribunal for the Former Yugoslavia (ICTY). He was initially acquitted on 30 May 2013 by the ICTY for his role in the wars but the verdict was later overturned on 15 December 2015 after successful appeal by the prosecutors (ICTY Appeals Chamber). The retrial before the UN Mechanism for International Criminal Tribunals (MICT) commenced on 13 June 2017. On 30 June 2021, he was found guilty under counts of murder, deportation, forcible transfer and persecution as crimes against humanity that occurred during the Bosanski Šamac ethnic cleansing, and sentenced to 12 years in prison. On appeal, his sentence was increased to 15 years in 2023.

== Background ==
Simatović was born in Belgrade into a Croatian family. His father Pero Simatović was born in Dubrovnik, his mother Neda (née Winter) in Bjelovar. Pero Simatović was a Yugoslav Partisan who after the war became a high-ranking officer in the Yugoslav Army, and was one of the founders of Partizan. Neda belonged to the influential family Winter in Bjelovar, and was the daughter of Franko Winter (whom Simatović is named after), the founder of a law firm in Bjelovar. The family has lived in Belgrade since after World War II.

Franko Simatović studied at the Higher Police School and University of Belgrade Faculty of Political Sciences. His mentor, colleague and personal friend was Jovica Stanišić. Both were recruited into the State Security Service (SDB) immediately after studies, where they quickly rose in rank. During Slobodan Milošević's rise to power, Simatović was the head of the department dealing with affairs of American agencies in Yugoslavia. Simatović kept an office at Stanišić's command center in the village of Magarcevac, Croatia and both men had assumed command of regional forces in western Bosnia. They also led the ‘Pauk’ (‘Spider’) operation in Cazinska Krajina, Bosnia between 1994 and 1995.

== ICTY trial ==
=== Indictment and trial (2003–2013) ===
After the assassination of Zoran Đinđić, Stanišić was arrested on 13 March 2003 during Operation Sabre by the Serbian Police and handed over to the International Criminal Tribunal for the former Yugoslavia (ICTY) on 30 May 2003. The original indictment against him and Jovica Stanišić was created in May 2003, and was later amended several times. He pleaded not guilty to all charges.

Simatović was accused of committing atrocities against non-Serbs during the Yugoslav wars including persecution and murder. As part of Milan Martić's trial at the ICTY, Simatović was found to be part of a "joint criminal enterprise which aimed to create a Greater Serbia including parts of Croatia and Bosnia and Herzegovina."

=== Acquittal and appeal (2013–2017) ===
Simatović and Stanišić were acquitted of all charges on 30 May 2013.

However, his acquittal as well as that of Jovica Stanišić, had been overturned on 15 December 2015 by the appeals chamber, which vacated the initial verdict deemed faulty as it was based on an insistence that the men could only be guilty if they "specifically directed" the crimes. On 22 December 2015, Simatović and Stanišić were granted temporary release. Back in Serbia, the two had to report to a local police station in Belgrade every day and surrender their passports to the Ministry of Justice of Serbia. He and Stanišić were on provisional release from December 2015 to June 2017.

=== MICT retrial (2017–2023) ===
A new trial began on 13 June 2017, and is being handled by the UN Mechanism for International Criminal Tribunals (MICT), which took over the ICTY's remaining cases as it closes in December 2017. In December 2017, he was granted a provisional release until 19 January 2018. In August 2018, only his co-defendant Stanišić was reported to still be on provisional release. As of November 2019, Simatović was still in The Hague attending the trial, while Stanistic remained on provisional release. However, Simatovic was later granted provisional release from 12 March 2020, to 13 August 2020. After his provisional release ended, Simatović was returned to his UN-run detention unit and again appeared in person for an appeal hearing held at a Hague court on 28 August 2020.

On 30 June 2021, he and Stanišić were found guilty under counts of murder, deportation, forcible transfer and persecution as crimes against humanity that occurred in Bosanski Šamac in April 1992, and sentenced to 12 years in prison, making it the first case of the Tribunal in which an official from Serbia was convicted for crimes in Bosnia and Herzegovina. On appeal, Simatović's sentence was increased to 15 years on 31 May 2023. He was found guilty of other crimes in Bosnia and Herzegovina (Bijeljina, Zvornik, Doboj, Sanski Most, Trnovo) and Croatia (Daljska Planina), and included in a joint criminal enterprise. The Tribunal concluded:

...the Trial Chamber found proven beyond reasonable doubt that, from at least August 1991 and at all times relevant to the crimes charged in the Indictment, a common criminal purpose existed to forcibly and permanently remove the majority of non-Serbs from large areas of Croatia and Bosnia and Herzegovina, through the commission of the crimes of persecution, murder, deportation, and inhumane acts (forcible transfer) charged in the Indictment... The Appeals Chamber has further concluded that all reasonable doubt has been eliminated that Stanišić and Simatović possessed the requisite mens rea for joint criminal enterprise liability. Consequently, the Appeals Chamber has concluded that Stanišić and Simatović bear criminal responsibility under Article 1 of the Statute and Articles 3, 5, and 7(1) of the ICTY Statute for committing, based on their participation in a joint criminal enterprise (first category), the following crimes committed in Bosnia and Herzegovina and Croatia: (i) deportation, inhumane acts (forcible transfer), and persecution committed in connection with the takeover of Bijeljina by the Serbian Volunteer Guard as well as Serb forces and paramilitaries that worked in coordination with it; (ii) murder, deportation, inhumane acts (forcible transfer), and persecution.

=== Release ===
Simatović was released early on 1 September 2023, due to seriously deteriorating health.

== See also ==
- State Security Directorate
- Special Operations Unit
