= Mitsu =

Mitsu may refer to:

- Mitsubishi Motors, a Japanese multinational automotive manufacturer

== Places ==
- Mitsu, Hyōgo, former town in Hyogo Prefecture, Japan
- Mitsu, Okayama, former town in Okayama Prefecture, Japan

== People ==
- Mitsu Arakawa (1927 – 1997), American professional wrestler
- Mitsu Dan (born 1980), Japanese actress and writer
- Mitsu Kōro (1893 – 1980), Japanese politician
- Mitsu Murata (born 1977), Japanese actor and music producer
- Okita Mitsu (1833 – 1907), eldest daughter of a Japanese samurai family
- Mitsu Shimojo (born 1955), Japanese politician
- Mitsu Tanaka (born 1945) Japanese feminist and writer
- Mitsu Yashima (1908 – 1988), Japanese artist, author, and activist
- Mitsu Kusabue, a fictional character in the manga series Rozen Maiden

== Others ==
Mitsu-gusoku (Japanese: 三具足) in Japanese Buddhism is a traditional arrangement of three articles

== See also ==
- Mitu (disambiguation)
- Mittu (disambiguation)
- Mithu (disambiguation)
