= Lóránt Lukács =

Hungarian cinematographer and motorcycle racer

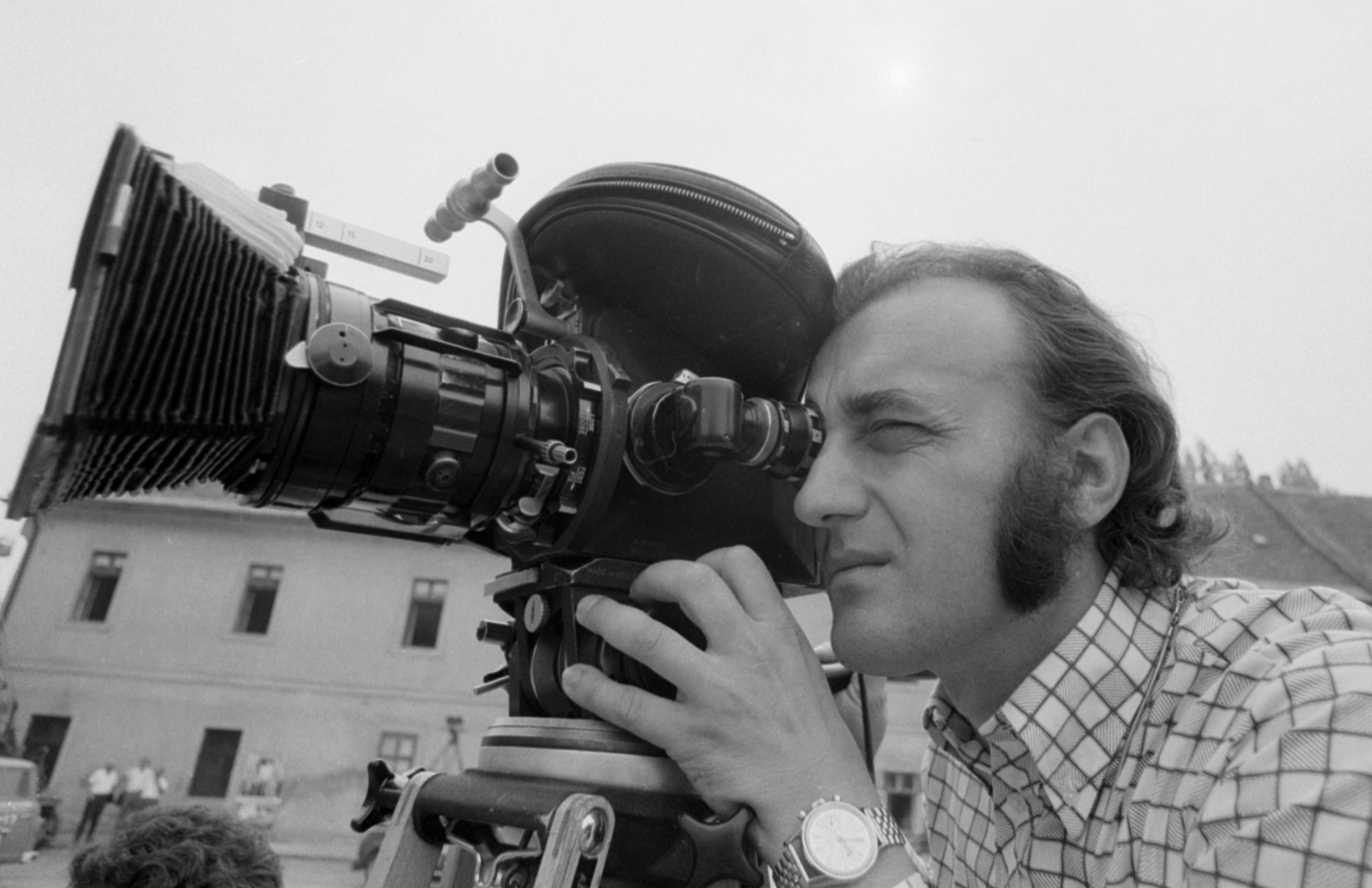
- Lukács in 1964
- Born: 27 November 1934; Budapest, Kingdom of Hungary
- Died: 26 February 2025 (aged 90)
- Education: University of Theatre and Film Arts in Budapest
- Occupations: Cinematographer, motorcycle racer

Lóránt Lukács (27 November 1934 – 26 February 2025) was a Hungarian cinematographer and motorcycle racer. He was a recipient of the Béla Balázs Award (1977).

Lukács died on 26 February 2025, at the age of 90.
