= Miko (disambiguation) =

A miko is a shrine maiden or a supplementary princess in Shinto religion.

Miko may also refer to:

== People ==
- Miko (name), a given name in several cultures
- Miko (surname)
- DJ Miko, an Italian DJ

== Fictional characters ==
- Miko, an alien from a 1987 film Nukie
- Miko Kubota, a character from the animated series Glitch Techs
- Miko Nakadai, a character from the animated series Transformers: Prime
- Koyori, also known as Miko, a video game character by Psikyo

== Other ==
- Miko (song), a song written by American electronic rock musician Kamtin Mohager
- Miko Coffee, a brand of Belgian coffee
- Miko, a French ice cream manufacturer by Unilever.

== See also ==
- Mico (disambiguation)
