= Thomas C. Peebles =

American physician

Thomas Chalmers Peebles (June 5, 1921 – July 8, 2010) was an American physician who made multiple discoveries in the field of medicine, including being the first to isolate the measles virus. Peebles also did research that led to the development of fluoridated vitamins and did research that showed that tetanus vaccine could be given once every ten years, rather than annually as had been the widespread practice.

== Early life ==
Peebles was born on June 5, 1921, in Newton, Massachusetts, and graduated from Harvard University in 1942 with a major in French language. He enlisted in the United States Navy and served as a bomber pilot in the Pacific Theater of Operations, earning the Distinguished Flying Cross. He had been recruited by KLM as a pilot after completing his military service but chose to apply to Harvard Medical School, which rejected him because he had received a D in college biology. He attended Boston University for a year, taking the pre-med courses he had not taken as an undergraduate. He was finally accepted by Harvard Medical School but spent an intervening year teaching at an elementary school in South Carolina. He worked at a laundry to help pay for those medical school costs not covered by the G.I. Bill.

== Career ==
After completing medical school he did an internship and residency in pediatrics at Massachusetts General Hospital, where he later became a Chief Resident of Pediatrics. He was also a Fellow at Children's Hospital Boston, where he worked with Dr. John Franklin Enders, known as "The Father of Modern Vaccines", who earned the Nobel Prize in 1954 for his research on cultivating the polio virus that led to the development of a vaccination for the disease. Switching to study measles, Peebles was sent to a Fay School where an outbreak of the disease was underway and was able to isolate the virus from some of the blood samples and throat swabs he took from students. Even after Enders had taken him off the study team, Peebles was able to cultivate the virus and show that the disease could be passed on to monkeys inoculated with the material he had collected. Enders was able to use the cultivated virus to develop a measles vaccine in 1963 based on the material isolated by Peebles. In the late 1950s and early 1960s, nearly twice as many children died from measles as from polio. The vaccine for measles has led to the near-complete elimination of the disease in the United States and other developed countries.

In a study he performed on the tetanus vaccine, he found that people were getting as much as 2,500 times the amount needed to provide protection, showing that the booster doses could be given once every ten years, rather than yearly, while substantially reducing the risk of allergic reactions caused by the higher dosages in common use. In his private practice, he noticed that patients from towns where the water was fluoridated had fewer cavities. He conducted research and determined a dosage that was included as part of a regular vitamin.

== Personal life ==
Peebles died at age 89 on July 8, 2010, in his home in Port Charlotte, Florida. He was survived by his wife, the former Annie Diffley, as well as by a daughter, two sons, and five grandchildren.
