= Mitu, Iran =

Mitu ميتو
- Village
- Location within Iran
- Coordinates: 36°11′55″N 46°05′12″E
- Country: Iran
- Province: Kurdistan
- County: Saqqez
- Bakhsh: Central
- Rural District: Tamugheh

Population (2006)
  - Total: 120
- Time zone: UTC+3:30 (IRST)
  - Summer (DST): UTC+4:30 (IRDT)

Mitu (Persian: ميتو, also Romanized as Mītū; also known as Matru) is a village in Tamugheh Rural District, in the Central District of Saqqez County, Kurdistan Province, Iran. At the 2006 census, its population was 120, in 22 families. The village is populated by Kurds.
