= John Franklin Enders =

American medical researcher (1897-1985)

John Franklin Enders ForMemRS
- Enders in 1954
- Born: February 10, 1897; West Hartford, Connecticut
- Died: September 8, 1985 (aged 88); Waterford, Connecticut
- Education: St. Paul's School; Yale University; Harvard University
- Known for: culturing poliovirus, isolating measlesvirus, developing measles vaccine
- Awards: Albert Lasker Award for Basic Medical Research (1954); Nobel Prize in Physiology or Medicine (1954); Cameron Prize for Therapeutics of the University of Edinburgh (1960)

John Franklin Enders (February 10, 1897 – September 8, 1985) was an American biomedical scientist and Nobel Laureate. Enders has been called "The Father of Modern Vaccines."

== Life and education ==
Enders was born in West Hartford, Connecticut, on February 10, 1897. His father, John Ostrom Enders, was CEO of the Hartford National Bank and left him a fortune of $19 million upon his death. He attended the Noah Webster School in Hartford, and graduated from St. Paul's School in Concord, New Hampshire in 1915. After attending Yale University a short time, he joined the United States Army Air Corps in 1918 as a flight instructor and a lieutenant.

After returning from World War I, he graduated from Yale, where he was a member of Scroll and Key as well as Delta Kappa Epsilon. He went into real estate in 1922, and tried several careers before choosing the biomedical field with a focus on infectious diseases, gaining a PhD at Harvard in 1930. He later joined the faculty at Children's Hospital Boston.

Enders died at his summer home in Waterford, Connecticut, aged 88, on 8 September 1985. His wife died in 2000.

== Biomedical career ==
In 1949, Enders, Thomas Huckle Weller, and Frederick Chapman Robbins reported successful in vitro culture of an animal virus—poliovirus. The three received the 1954 Nobel Prize in Physiology or Medicine "for their discovery of the ability of poliomyelitis viruses to grow in cultures of various types of tissue".

Meanwhile, Jonas Salk applied the Enders-Weller-Robbins technique to produce large quantities of poliovirus, and then developed a polio vaccine in 1952. Upon the 1954 polio vaccine field trial, whose success Salk announced on the radio, Salk became a public hero but failed to credit the many other researchers that his effort rode upon, and was somewhat shunned by America's scientific establishment.

In 1954, Enders and Thomas C. Peebles isolated measlesvirus from an 11-year-old boy, David Edmonston. Disappointed by polio vaccine's development and involvement in some cases of polio and death—what Enders attributed to Salk's technique—Enders began development of measles vaccine. In October 1960, an Enders team began trials on 1,500 intellectually disabled children in New York City and on 4,000 children in Nigeria. Refusing credit for merely himself when The New York Times announced the measles vaccine effective on September 17, 1961, Enders wrote to the newspaper to acknowledge the work of various colleagues and the collaborative nature of the research. In 1963, a deactivated measles vaccine and an attenuated measles vaccine were introduced by Pfizer and Merck & Co., respectively.

He continued to work in virology research till the late 1970s and retired from the laboratory at the age of 80.

== Honors ==
Honors

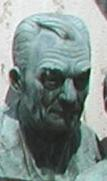
Bust of Enders in the Polio Hall of Fame

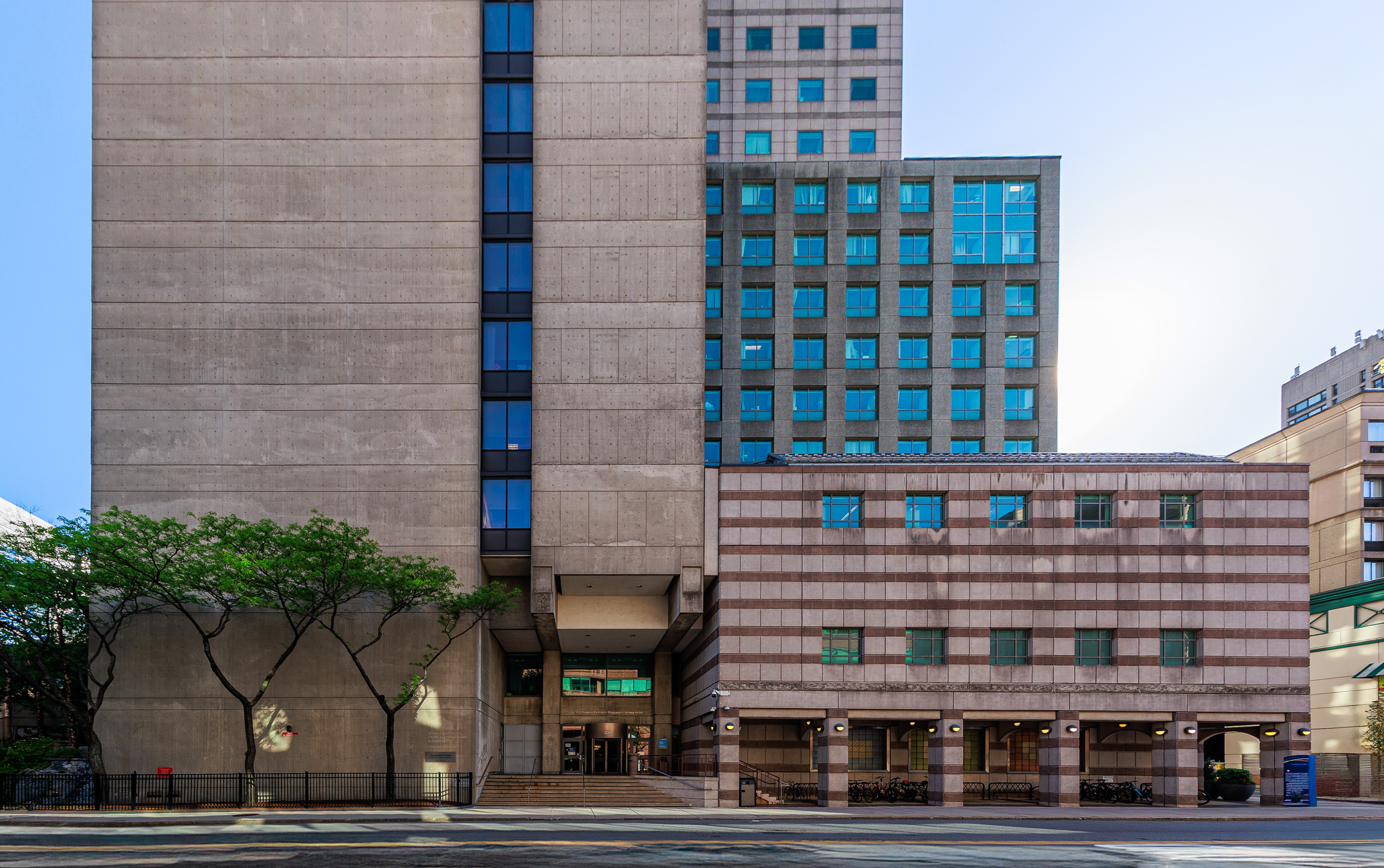
John F. Enders Pediatric Research Laboratories at Boston Children's Hospital

- 1946: Fellow of the American Academy of Arts and Sciences
- 1953: Member of the American Philosophical Society
- 1954: Nobel Prize in Physiology or Medicine (together with Frederick Chapman Robbins and Thomas Huckle Weller)
- 1954: Albert Lasker Award for Basic Medical Research
- 1955: Kyle Award from the U.S. Public Health Service
- 1955: Member of the American Philosophical Society
- 1958: inducted into the Polio Hall of Fame
- 1960: Cameron Prize for Therapeutics of the University of Edinburgh
- 1962: Robert Koch Prize
- 1963: Presidential Medal of Freedom
- 1963: Science Achievement Award from the American Medical Association
- 1967: Foreign Member, The Royal Society
- 1970: John F. Enders Pediatric Research Laboratories dedicated

Enders also held honorary doctoral degrees from 13 universities.

== See also ==
- Anna Mitus
