= Mitu (given name) =

Mitu is a given name of the following notable people:

- Mitu Khandaker, a British game designer and engineer
- Mitu Khurana, Indian pediatrician
