= Mittu Khedi =

- village
- Location within Madhya Pradesh Location within India
- Coordinates: 23.144338°N 77.323058°E
- Country: India
- State: Madhya Pradesh
- District: Bhopal
- Tehsil: Huzur

Population (2011)
  - Total: 112
- Time zone: UTC+5:30 (IST)
- ISO 3166 code: MP-IN
- Census code: 482514

Mittu Khedi is a village in the Bhopal district of Madhya Pradesh, India. It is located in the Huzur tehsil and the Phanda block.

== Demographics ==
According to the 2011 census of India, Mittu Khedi has 29 households. The effective literacy rate (i.e. the literacy rate of population excluding children aged 6 and below) is 70.93%.

Demographics (2011 Census)
	Total	Male	Female
Population	112	57	55
Children aged below 6 years	26	11	15
Scheduled caste	17	10	7
Scheduled tribe	19	8	11
Literates	61	38	23
Workers (all)	33	29	4
Main workers (total)	32	29	3
Main workers: Cultivators	24	24	0
Main workers: Agricultural labourers	6	3	3
Main workers: Household industry workers	0	0	0
Main workers: Other	2	2	0
Marginal workers (total)	1	0	1
Marginal workers: Cultivators	1	0	1
Marginal workers: Agricultural labourers	0	0	0
Marginal workers: Household industry workers	0	0	0
Marginal workers: Others	0	0	0
Non-workers	79	28	51
