= Mizo =

Mizo may refer to:

- Mizo people, an ethnic group native to Mizoram, north-eastern India, western Myanmar (Burma) and eastern Bangladesh
- Mizo language, a language spoken by the Mizo people
- Mizoram, a state in Northeast India, known as 'The Silent City', 'The Land of Blue Mountains', 'The Songbird of India'.
- Lushai Hills, a mountain range in Mizoram and Tripura, part of a Patkai range
- Mizo Union the first political party in Mizoram, northeast India
- Mizo National Front (MNF), a regional political party in Mizoram, India
- Mizo Accord an accord signed between the Mizo National Front and the Government of India on June 30, 1986
