= József Mikó =

Hungarian cinematographer

Joseph S. Miko (József S. Mikó)
- Born: August 6, 1920; Hungary
- Died: April 28, 2008 (aged 87); Los Angeles, California
- Other name: Joseph Miko
- Occupation: Camera operator
- Spouse: Eva Miko - Victoria Miko
- Children: Joe Miko
- Awards: Hungarian Government’s Award for Excellence in Achievement; Hero of Freedom Award; Cross of the Order of Merit

József S. Mikó (Joseph S. Miko) Joseph Miko was a cinematographer in Hungary when the 1956 revolution against the Russian occupation broke out. Miko grabbed the opportunity to film the revolution in hopes of getting the films out of Hungary so the rest of the world could see the brutality of the Soviet Union. The Soviet government found out about his activities and they wanted him and the films he shot. Joseph Miko with wife Eva and Joe jr. fled the country to avoid capture, imprisonment and possible execution.

The films Miko shot of the revolution were smuggled out of Hungary in the U.S. diplomatic pouch. In return for providing the American government copies of the films for intelligence purposes, the Miko family was granted passage on the U S Military airlift to the United States.

Joseph Miko was one of three Hungarian cinematographer who immigrated to the United States as a result of the 1956 Hungarian Revolution. Joe Miko’s close friend, Vilmos Zsigmond eventually become very successful in Hollywood. Zsigmond received an Academy Award for Close Encounters of the Third Kind and was again nominated for the Black Dahlia.

After working on a couple of low budget movies with Vilmos Zsigmond such as The Sadist, Joseph Miko left the industry and became a successful businessman in Santa Monica, California. 80% of the movies that exist in the world of the 1956 Hungarian revolution were shot by Miko who has since donated them back to Hungary. The films are archived as “The Miko Collection” as part of the official historical record of that event. They have been featured on numerous television shows including The Twentieth Century with Walter Cronkite and the History channel’s Caught on Film and in recently completed documentaries Freedom's Fury and Torn from the Flag.

Joseph S. Miko and cinematographer, Laszlo Kovacs, were also close friends after they both emigrated to the U.S. in 1956. Regrettably their friendship became strained over the years after Kovacs tried to claim credit for the footage of the Hungarian revolution shot by Miko. However, the original Agfa stock footage is held in storage by the Miko family and is available for authentication.

After the restoration of democracy in Hungary, he was awarded the Hungarian Government’s Award for Excellence in Achievement and the Hero of Freedom Award as well as the Cross of the Order of Merit.

== Sources ==
- Biography for Joseph Miko
- Noted cameraman Miko dead at 87
- Emlékezés az 1956-os forradalomra
- Elhunyt Joseph Mikó, 1956 operatőre
- Elhunyt Joseph Mikó
- Meghalt Joseph Mikó, az 56-os forradalom operatőre - Népszabadság Online, 11 May 2008
- J. S. Miko – Filmed Hungarian Revolution – The Washington Post May 15, 2008
- Joe Miko - Hungry for Freedom
