= Miko (given name) =

Given name

Miko is a given name found in several cultures. It can be a Japanese female name. It can be an eastern European name, with origins in Slovakia, sometimes short for Mikolaj. Miko can also be a variant of the name Michael, which has Hebrew origins.

The name Miko may refer to:

- Miko Doyle (1911–1980), Irish sportsman
- Miko Golubovic (born 1982), Montenegrin basketball player
- Miko Hughes (born 1986), American actor
- Miko Lim (born 1980), American photographer
- Miko Mälberg (born 1985), Estonian swimmer
- Miko Marks, American singer-songwriter
- Miko Mayama (born 1939), Japanese-American actress
- Miko Mission (born 1945), Italian musician
- Miko Peled (born 1961), Israeli political activist
- Miko Rwayitare (1942–2007), Rwandan businessman
- Miko Sotto (1982–2003), Filipino actor
- Miko Tavares (born 1981), Cape Verdean football player
- Miko Tripalo (1926–1995), Croatian politician
- Miko Weaver (born 1957), American guitarist
- Yae Miko, a character in 2020 video game Genshin Impact
- Sakura Miko, a vtuber from Hololive Production
- Toyosatomimi no Miko, a character from Ten Desires in the Touhou Project series

also Mikó:

- Mikó (archbishop of Kalocsa), 12th-century Hungarian prelate

== See also ==
- Mika
- Mikko
- Mito (name)
