= Mićo Stanišić =

Bosnian politician (born 1954)

Mićo Stanišić (born 30 June 1954) is a Bosnian Serb politician.

Stanišić was born in the village of Ponor, Bosnia and Herzegovina. He graduated from the Sarajevo Law School. From 21 December 1991, Stanišić was Minister Without Portfolio of the Council of Ministers of Bosnia-Herzegovina. From 1 April 1992, he was the Minister of the Republika Srpska Ministry of Internal Affairs.

During the Yugoslav wars he organized the Pahuljice Special Police Unit (Snowflakes) that battled in Republika Srpska under commander Dušan Malović, a notable Serbian mafioso connected with the Voždovac Clan. The unit is suspected of committing a massacre of 22 people, among them children, on 25 November 1992 in Bijeljina.

Stanišić surrendered himself to the Hague Tribunal on 11 March 2005. He stood trial for persecution of non-Serbs of 20 municipalities in Bosnia and Herzegovina. On 27 March 2013 Stanišić was sentenced to 22 years in jail by the war crimes tribunal in The Hague.
