= Joint criminal enterprise =

Concept in international criminal law

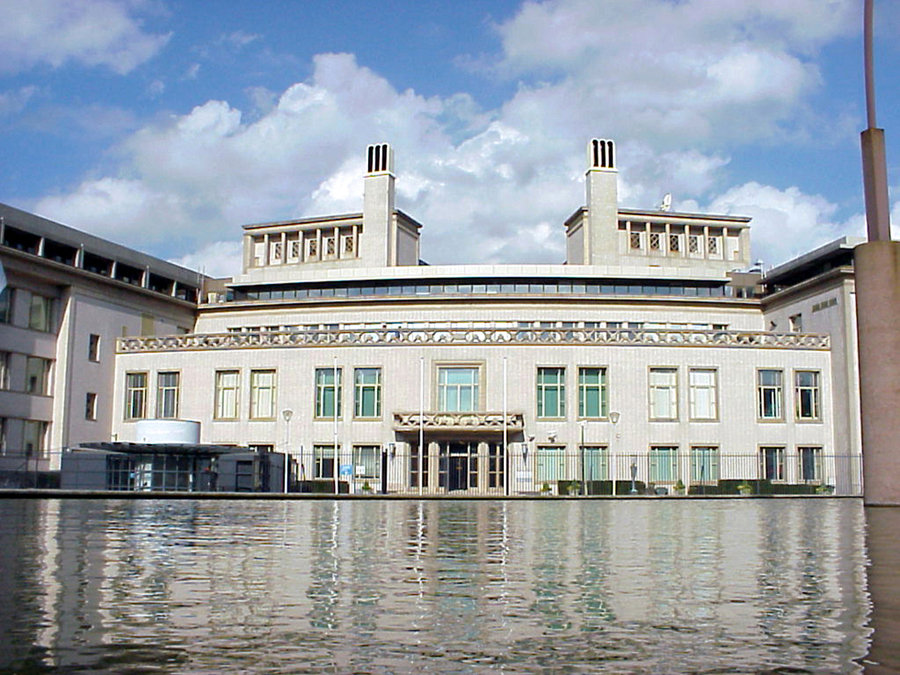
Building of International Criminal Tribunal for the former Yugoslavia in The Hague.

Joint criminal enterprise (JCE) is a legal doctrine that has been used during war crimes tribunals to prosecute individuals in a group for the actions of said group. This doctrine considers each member of an organized group individually responsible for crimes committed by the group within its common plan or purpose.

The legal doctrine specifically arose through the application of the idea of common purpose and has been applied by the International Criminal Tribunal for the former Yugoslavia (ICTY) to prosecute political and military leaders for mass war crimes, including genocide, committed during the Yugoslav Wars from 1991 to 1999.

For example, "if three people commit a bank robbery and one fatally shoots a person in the process, the law considers all guilty of murder" via the concept of "collective liability" where more than one person can share liability and punishment for the actions of another person. The idea of "collective liability," however, has not been universally accepted and is considered by some to be a form of human rights abuse, while others believe it is just.

== Definition ==
=== Early usages ===
The first usages of joint criminal enterprise doctrine have been identified in post-World War II cases in which the doctrine was used under the name common purpose (or joint enterprise), or without specific naming.

Without a certain degree of cooperation and coordination of actions, it is virtually impossible to perpetrate atrocities such as genocide or crimes against humanity.

However, the origins of the doctrine may also be influenced by the common law of England, which introduced the principle into criminal law in the U.K. and other Commonwealth nations such as Australia. A similar legal principle can also be found in Texas, United States, where it is known as the law of parties. However, the notion of collective liability and shared punishment for the actions of others, as if all perpetrated the same deed, may be much older; for instance, it was used to justify extermination of religious and cultural groups, such as the Albigensian "Heretics" and those who harbored them.

The doctrine has also been used at the International Criminal Tribunal for Rwanda and the Special Court for Sierra Leone. Meanwhile, the International Criminal Court uses a similar but different doctrine of co-perpetratorship, which some ICTY judges attempted to introduce instead of joint criminal enterprise.

=== ICTY definition ===
The first reference to joint criminal enterprise and its constituent elements was provided in the Tadić case of 1999 in Yugoslavia. The Appeals Chamber of the ICTY decided on 21 May 2003 on the following definitions:

The Tribunal's jurisdiction ratione personae: in order to fall within the Tribunal's jurisdiction ratione personae, any form of liability must satisfy four preconditions: (i) it must be provided for in the Statute, explicitly or implicitly; (ii) it must have existed under customary international law at the relevant time; (iii) the law providing for that form of liability must have been sufficiently foreseeable at the relevant time to anyone who acted in such a way; and (iv) such person must have been able to foresee that he could be held criminally liable for his actions if apprehended.

Joint criminal enterprise and the Tribunal's Statute: the reference to that crime or to that form of liability does not need to be explicit to come within the purview of the Tribunal's jurisdiction. The Statute of the ICTY is not and does not purport to be a meticulously detailed code providing for every possible scenario and every solution thereto. It sets out in somewhat general terms the jurisdictional framework within which the Tribunal has been mandated to operate. The list in Article 7(1) appears to be non-exhaustive in nature as the use of the phrase 'or otherwise aided and abetted' suggests.

The nature of joint criminal enterprise: insofar as a participant shares the purpose of the joint criminal enterprise (as he or she must do) as opposed to merely knowing about it, he or she cannot be regarded as a mere aider and abettor to the crime which is contemplated. Joint criminal enterprise is a form of 'commission' pursuant to Article 7(1) of the Statute.

Joint criminal enterprise and conspiracy: joint criminal enterprise and 'conspiracy' are two different forms of liability. While mere agreement is sufficient in the case of conspiracy, the liability of a member of a joint criminal enterprise will depend on the commission of criminal acts in furtherance of that enterprise.

Joint criminal enterprise and membership in a criminal organisation: criminal liability pursuant to joint criminal enterprise is not a liability for mere membership or for conspiring to commit crimes but a form of liability concerned with the participation in the commission of a crime as part of a joint criminal enterprise, a different matter.

=== Criticism ===
Writing about this finding in the Journal of International Criminal Justice in 2004, Steven Powles—a barrister who appeared as defense counsel in matters before the ICTY and the Special Court for Sierra Leone—states that the Appeals Chamber was obliged to make this declaration because there was no specific mention of "joint criminal enterprise" in the court's statutes and that "this is not ideal [because] criminal law, especially international criminal law, requires clear and certain definitions of the various bases of liability, so as to enable the parties, both the prosecution and, perhaps more importantly, the defence to prepare for and conduct the trial."

Critics have argued that joint criminal enterprise can lead to excessive legal process and punishments, that it lowers the evidential bar in favor of prosecution, and that it runs counter to the spirit of Blackstone's formulation. Supporters, however, argue that it ensures those contributing to or instigating a criminal act are properly held accountable for their involvement.

== Post-World War II trials ==
In the aftermath of World War II, the courts established by the United Kingdom and the United States in Germany applied an early vision of the joint criminal enterprise doctrine in the trials against Nazis. Additionally, the Italian Supreme Court applied a similar doctrine in the trials against fascists.

=== Concentration camp cases ===
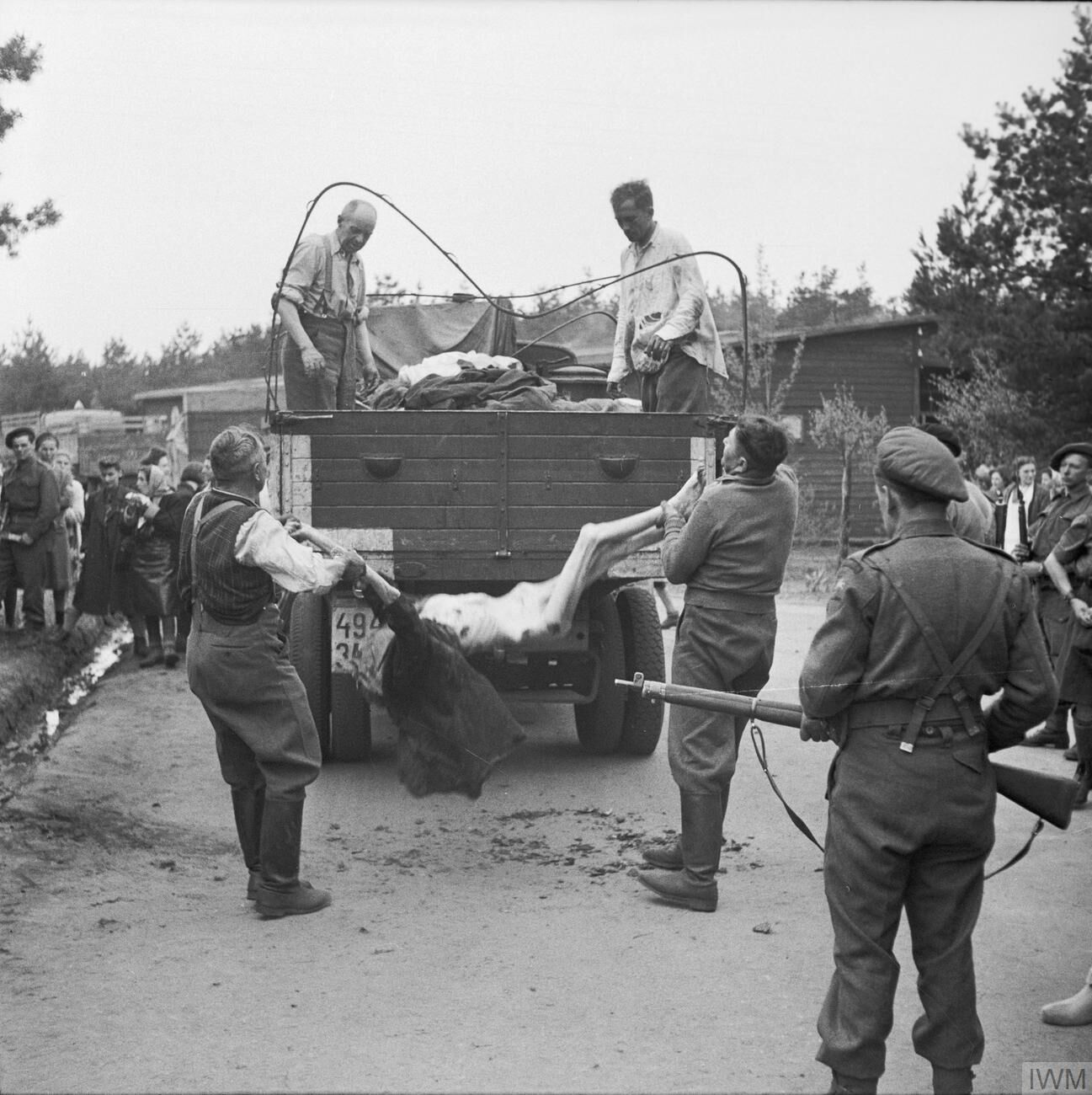
Former guards of Belsen Concentration Camp load the bodies of dead prisoners onto a lorry for burial (April 1945).

In the post-World War II Dachau Concentration Camp case, decided by a United States court, and the Belsen case, decided by a British military court, both in Germany, the accused held positions of authority within the hierarchy of the Nazi concentration camps. As such, they were found guilt insofar as they had acted in pursuance of a common plan to kill or mistreat prisoners even if they had not personally committed the acts.

=== Essen lynching case ===
The Essen lynching case, conducted before a British military court, bears the closest link to the joint criminal enterprise doctrine. In that case, three British airmen (prisoners of war) had been lynched by a mob of Germans in Essen on 13 December 1944.

Seven persons were charged with committing a war crime, including a German captain who had placed prisoners under the escort of a German soldier. While the escort was leaving, the captain ordered the soldier not to interfere if German civilians harassed the prisoners. This order was given in a loud voice so that the gathering crowd could hear. When the prisoners of war were marched through one of the main streets of Essen, the crowd grew bigger, after which they started hitting the prisoners of war and throwing stones at them. When the escort reached the bridge, the prisoners were thrown over its parapet; one of the airmen was killed by the fall, while the two others were killed by members of the crowd.

Ultimately, seven of the 10 people considered to have been involved in the case were convicted.

== Post-Yugoslav War trials ==
The use of joint criminal enterprise as an actual criminal investigation and prosecution theory first appeared at the ICTY through a written proposal to Chief Prosecutor Carla Del Ponte which had been developed and authored by American prosecutor Dermot Groome (at the time, the legal officer for the Bosnia case) and American Investigator John Cencich, head of the Milosevic investigation for crimes allegedly committed in Croatia. (Cencich provides an in-depth look at the actual development of the investigation and prosecution theory of the JCE in his doctoral dissertation at the University of Notre Dame, in the International Criminal Justice Review, and in his book, The Devil's Garden: A War Crimes Investigator's Story.)

=== Indictments to Serb leaders ===
The ICTY prosecutor indicted Slobodan Milošević on three separate indictments which, upon appeal, were successfully considered as one indictment. As the prosecution had not used the same language in all three indictments, it was left to the Court of Appeal to decide if the alleged criminal enterprises in the three indictments were the same by determining what was common between the allegations. The ICTY Appeals count decided that:

A joint criminal enterprise to remove forcibly the majority of the non-Serb population from areas which the Serb authorities wished to establish or to maintain as Serbian controlled areas by the commission of the crimes charged remains the same transaction notwithstanding the fact that it is put into effect from time to time and over a long period of time as required. Despite the misleading allegation in the Kosovo indictment, therefore, the Appeals Chamber is satisfied that the events alleged in all three indictments do form part of the same transaction.

Milošević died during the trial, but he was still found to have been a part of a joint criminal enterprise in the verdicts against Milan Martić and Milan Babić, the latter of whom publicly admitted his own (and Milošević's) guilt.

According to the ICTY prosecutor's indictment, Milutinović et al., Nikola Šainović, Nebojša Pavković, and Sreten Lukić, along with others, participated in a joint criminal enterprise to modify the ethnic balance in Kosovo in order to ensure continued control by the FRY and Serbian authorities over the province. On 26 February 2009, the court returned the following verdicts:

- Nikola Šainović, "had substantial de facto powers over both the MUP and the VJ operating in Kosovo, and that he was the political co-ordinator of these forces. It is convinced that he made a significant contribution to the joint criminal enterprise and that, indeed, he was one of the most crucial members of that common enterprise. He was found guilty "of counts 1 to 5 of the Indictment, by commission as a member of a joint pursuant to Article 7(1) of the Statute".
- Nebojša Pavković "had substantial de jure and de facto command authority over VJ forces in Kosovo in 1998 and 1999, and that he was in a position of influence, including through his participation in the Joint Command. There is no doubt that his contribution to the joint criminal enterprise was significant, as he utilised the VJ forces at his disposal to terrorise and violently expel Kosovo Albanian civilians from their homes." He was found guilty of "counts 1 to 5 of the Indictment, by commission as a member of a joint criminal enterprise pursuant to Article 7(1) of the Statute".
- Sreten Lukić "had substantial authority over MUP units deployed in Kosovo ... the Chamber finds that Lukić was indeed an important participant in the joint criminal enterprise, and made a significant contribution through his control of the MUP forces involved in its execution." He was found guilty of "counts 1 to 5 of the Indictment, by commission as a member of a joint criminal enterprise pursuant to Article 7(1) of the Statute".

On 27 May 2009, the Prosecution filed its notice of appeal in respect of all of the accused except Milan Milutinović. On the same day, all Defence teams filed their notices of appeal.

=== Indictments to Croat leaders ===
Former Yugoslavia during war

The ICTY found, in a first-instance verdict, that General Ante Gotovina along with Ivan Čermak and Mladen Markač participated in a joint criminal enterprise with Croatian President Franjo Tuđman with the goal to do "the forcible and permanent removal of the Serb population from the [territory occupied by the forces of the] Republic of Serbian Krajina". Nevertheless, ICTY's appeals chamber acquitted Gotovina, Čermak, and Markač of all charges, including the one of participation in the joint criminal enterprise. In April 2001, ICTY chief prosecutor Carla Del Ponte stated that she was preparing to indict Tudjman prior to his death in December 1999.

In May 2013, Jadranko Prlić and others were found guilty for taking part in the joint criminal enterprise with Tudjman for crimes committed in the Croatian Republic of Herzeg-Bosnia against Muslims. However, on 19 July 2016, the Appeals Chamber concluded that the "Trial Chamber made no explicit findings concerning [Tuđman's] participation in the joint criminal enterprise and did not find [him] guilty of any crimes." In November 2017, the ICTY reaffirmed the first-instance verdict that Tudjman, as well as some other senior Croatian officials, had participated in a joint criminal enterprise with the defendants with the aim of persecuting Bosniaks.

=== Indictments to Kosovar Albanian leaders ===
In September 2026, former Kosovo President and head of the Kosovo Liberation Army (KLA) Hashim Thaci, along with politicians and former KLA leaders Jakup Krasniqi, Kadri Veseli and Rexhep Selimi were found guilty of war crimes and sentenced to prison sentences by the Kosovo Specialist Chambers. The court ruled that they were part of a joint criminal enterprise which targeted perceived opponents of the KLA, including Albanian, Serb and Roma people.

== Rwandan genocide trials ==
The International Criminal Tribunal for Rwanda (ICTR) was an international court established in November 1994 by the United Nations Security Council in order to judge people responsible for the Rwandan genocide and other serious violations of international law in Rwanda, as well as similar crimes committed by Rwandan citizens in nearby states in 1994.

At the Rwanda trials, the prosecution originally alleged that the genocidal common plan had been drawn up in 1990, but this theory was dismissed in December 2008 when the defendants in the mammoth "Military I" trial were acquitted of conspiracy to commit genocide.

== See also ==
- Common purpose
- Command responsibility
- Role of the media in the Yugoslav wars
- International Criminal Tribunal for the former Yugoslavia
- International Criminal Tribunal for Rwanda
