= List of Bosnian genocide prosecutions =

This is a comprehensive list of prosecutions brought against individuals for the crime of genocide in Bosnia and Herzegovina, and international cases brought against states for the same crime. Additionally, civil law cases brought against individuals and states seeking damages, in relation to the crime of genocide, are also listed.

== Bosnian Genocide Case ==
The Application of the Convention on the Prevention and Punishment of the Crime of Genocide (Bosnia and Herzegovina v. Serbia and Montenegro), case 91, International Court of Justice (ICJ) Judgement returned on 26 February 2007.

The case before the International Court of Justice (ICJ), the United Nations's highest judicial body, which exclusively hears disputes between states, related to Serbia's alleged attempts to wipe out the Bosnian Muslim population of Bosnia. It was filed by Dr. Francis Boyle, an adviser to Alija Izetbegović during the Bosnian War. The case was heard in the ICJ court in The Hague, Netherlands, and ended on 9 May 2006.

The ICJ presented its judgment on 26 February 2007, in which it confirmed the ICTY judgment that the Srebrenica massacre was genocide, stating:

The Court concludes that the acts committed at Srebrenica falling within Article II (a) and (b) of the Convention were committed with the specific intent to destroy in part the group of the Muslims of Bosnia and Herzegovina as such; and accordingly that these were acts of genocide, committed by members of the VRS in and around Srebrenica from about 13 July 1995.

The Court found that Serbia was neither directly responsible for Srebrenica genocide, nor that it was complicit in it, but it did rule that Serbia had committed the breach the Genocide Convention by failing to prevent the Srebrenica genocide, for not cooperating with the ICTY in punishing the perpetrators of the genocide, in particular in respect of General Ratko Mladić, and for violating its obligation to comply with the provisional measures ordered by the Court.

== Individual indictment and convictions for the crime of genocide ==
=== International Criminal Tribunal for the former Yugoslavia ===
As of 9 May 2007 the International Criminal Tribunal for the former Yugoslavia (ICTY) had passed legally binding verdicts against six people indicted for genocide and crimes committed in Srebrenica since 1993. Trials against seven indictees are ongoing, and three are still to start. The overview of the case-law indicates that most of the convictions were done under the joint criminal enterprise doctrine and aiding and abetting mode of liability, and comparatively less under the command responsibility doctrine.

==== Krstić case ====
In 1998 General-Major Radislav Krstić was indicted for genocide, crimes against humanity and violations of the laws or customs of war, based on his alleged role in the events in and around the Bosniak enclave of Srebrenica between 11 July 1995 and 1 November 1995 at the ICTY. On August 2, 2001, after the Trial Chamber was convinced beyond any reasonable doubt that a crime of genocide was committed in Srebrenica, it had convicted Krstić of genocide, who became the first person thus convicted before the Tribunal, and sentenced him to 46 years in prison. The Appeals Chamber had, after upholding the Trial Chamber's finding that Bosnian Serb forces had carried out genocide in Srebrenica, among other things, reduced Krstić's responsibility for genocide and for the murder of the Bosnian Muslims from that of a direct participant to that of an aider and abettor, and shortened his sentence to 35 years in prison. Krsić was subsequently transferred to the United Kingdom to serve his prison sentence at Wakefield Prison, but was later transferred to Long Lartin Prison.

==== Popović et al. case ====
At the ICTY, the trial of several senior Serb military and police officers facing charges ranging from genocide to murder and deportation for the crimes committed in Srebrenica began 14 July 2006. Their names are:

- Ljubiša Beara, was charged with one count of genocide or alternatively, complicity to commit genocide, four counts of crimes against humanity and One count of violations of the laws or customs of war. As Chief of Security of the Main Staff of the Bosnian Serb Army (VRS) he "had responsibility for dealing with captured Bosnian Muslim prisoners from Srebrenica from 11 July 1995 until 1 November 1995". He was transferred to the ICTY on 10 October 2004 and made an initial appearance on 12 October 2004, when did not enter a plea. On further appearances on 9 November 2004 and 11 November 2004, he pleaded not guilty to the counts of the Indictment.
- Ljubomir Borovčanin, was charged with one count of complicity in genocide, four counts of crimes against humanity and one count of violations of the laws or customs of war, because the Prosecutor of the ICTY "alleges that Ljubomir Borovcanin was present in and around the areas of Bratunac, Potocari, Sandici, Kravica, Srebrenica and Zvornik from 11 July to 18 July 1995. Units under his command were deployed in and around the areas of Potocari, Sandici, Kravica and Zvornik from 12 July to 18 July 1995. In the several days following the attack on Srebrenica, the VRS and Ministry of the Interior ("MUP") forces captured, detained, summarily executed, and buried over 7,000 Bosnian Muslim men and boys from the Srebrenica enclave, and forcibly transferred the Bosnian Muslim women and children of Srebrenica out of the enclave. The Indictment against Ljubomir Borovcanin refers to his alleged involvement in: opportunist killings in Potocari, opportunistic killings in Bratunac, wide-scale and organised killings in Potocari and Tisca, killings and mistreatment of prisoners captured along the Bratunac/Milici road and wide-scale and organised killings in the Zvornik area, as well as other opportunistic killings. Ljubomir Borovcanin, together with other VRS and MUP officers and units as identified in this Indictment, was a member of and knowingly participated in a Joint Criminal Enterprise, the common purpose of which was, among other things: to forcibly transfer the women and children from the Srebrenica enclave to Kladanj on 12 July and 13 July 1995; and to capture, detain, summarily execute by firing squad, bury, and rebury thousands of Bosnian Muslim men and boys aged 16 to 60 from the Srebrenica enclave from 12 July 1995 until and about 19 July 1995". He was transferred to the ICTY in the Hague on 1 April 2005.
- Drago Nikolić, was a 2nd Lieutenant who served as Chief of Security for the Zvornik Brigade of the VRS and reported to Vinko Pandurevic. He was accused by the prosecutor at the ICTY of aiding and abetting genocide, extermination, murder, persecutions, forcible transfer, deportation. He surrendered on 15 March 2005 and was transferred to the ICTY on 17 March 2005. On 23 March 2005, did not enter a plea. On 20 April 2005 he pleaded not guilty to all charges and again on 4 April 2006.
- Vinko Pandurević, was a Lieutenant Colonel in command of the Zvornik Brigade of the Drina Corps of the VRS. He was accused by the prosecutor at the ICTY for aiding and abetting genocide, extermination, murder, persecutions, forcible transfer, deportation. He surrendered on 15 March 2005 and was transferred to the ICTY on 17 March 2005. On 23 March 2005, he did not enter a plea. On 20 April 2005, pleaded not guilty to all charges; and again on 4 April 2006, pleaded not guilty to all charges.
- Vujadin Popović, was charged "with Genocide or Complicity in Genocide; Murder, Persecutions, Forcible Transfer and Inhumane Acts as Crimes Against Humanity; and Murder as a Violations of the Laws or Customs of War ... During the VRS attack on the Srebrenica enclave and the subsequent killings and executions of Bosnian Muslim men, Vujadin Popovic was a Lieutenant Colonel and was the Assistant Commander of Security on the staff of the Drina Corps. He was present and on duty in the Drina Corps zone of responsibility, which included Srebrenica, Potocari, Bratunac and Zvornik, from 11 July to 31 August 1995".

===== Trial verdicts =====
The Trial Chamber made its ruling on 10 June 2010, by which it stated that "[t]he scale and nature of the murder operation, the targeting of the victims, the systematic and organized manner in which it was carried out, and the plain intention to eliminate every Bosnian Muslim male who was captured or surrendered proves beyond reasonable doubt that members of the Bosnian Serb Forces, including members of the VRS Main Staff and Security Branch, intended to destroy the Muslims of Eastern Bosnia as a group."

As for the individual criminal responsibility the Chamber made the following rulings:

- Vujadin Popović - found guilty, of genocide, conspiracy to commit genocide, and crimes against humanity: commissioned murder (also a war crime), commission of extermination, commission of the crime of persecution through murder and cruel and inhumane treatment (the commission of murder, extermination and persecution were all carried out as part of a Joint Criminal Enterprise). He was found not guilty of the following crimes against humanity: inhumane acts (forcible transfer) and deportation. He was sentenced to life imprisonment.
- Ljubiša Beara - found guilty of genocide, conspiracy to commit genocide, and crimes against humanity: commission of extermination, commission of extermination, and commission of murder (the last was also a war crime). He was found not guilty of the following crimes against humanity: inhumane acts (forcible transfer) and deportation. He was sentenced to life imprisonment.
- Drago Nikolić - found guilty of aiding and abetting genocide, and guilty of crimes against humanity: extermination, persecution and murder (the last also a war crime). He was found not guilty on counts of conspiracy to commit genocide, and the crimes against humanity of: inhumane acts (forcible transfer) and deportation. He was sentenced to 35 years of imprisonment.
- Ljubomir Borovčanin - found guilty of aiding and abetting crimes against humanity: extermination, persecution, inhumane acts (forcible transfer) and murder (the last also a war crime). He was found guilty, under his superior responsibility, on counts of murder, as a crime against humanity and murder, as a violation of the laws or customs of war. He was found not guilty on counts of genocide, conspiracy to commit genocide and deportation, a crime against humanity. He was sentenced to 17 years imprisonment.
- Radivoje Miletić - found guilty, through committing, on counts of murder, as a crime against humanity, persecution, as a crime against humanity and inhumane acts (forcible transfer), a crime against humanity. He was found not guilty on counts of murder, as a violation of the laws or customs of war and deportation, a crime against humanity. He was sentenced to 19 years imprisonment.
- Milan Gvero - found guilty, of two counts of crimes against humanity (persecution and inhumane acts (forcible transfer)). He was found not guilty on counts of murder, as a crime against humanity, murder, as a violation of the laws or customs of war and deportation, a crime against humanity. He was sentenced to 5 years imprisonment.
- Vinko Pandurević - found guilty, of two counts of aiding and abetting crimes against humanity (persecution and inhumane acts (forcible transfer)). He was found guilty of aiding and abetting murder as a crime against humanity and as a breach of the laws of war. He was also found guilty as a superior, of murder as a crime against humanity and as a breach of the laws of war. He was found not guilty on counts of genocide, conspiracy to commit genocide, and of extermination and deportation (crimes against humanity). He was sentenced to 30 years imprisonment.

==== Appeal verdicts ====
The Appeals chamber issued its judgment on 30 January 2014. Ljubomir Borovčanin did not appeal the trial judgement and was transferred to Denmark in 2011 to serve his 17-year sentence, while Milan Gvero died, and thus the Appeals chamber terminated proceedings against him in March 2013 and held the Trial Judgement to be final in his regard. Regarding the rest, the chamber made the following rulings:

- Vujadin Popović and Ljubiša Beara - found guilty of genocide, conspiracy to commit genocide, violations of the laws or customs of war, and crimes against humanity, through their participation in a joint criminal enterprise. The chamber granted their appeal regarding the killing of six Bosnian Muslim men near Trnovo by the Scorpions paramilitary unit, and consequently it reversed their convictions with regard to that killing. It also granted in part the prosecution's appeal to enter convictions for conspiracy to commit genocide against both Popović and Beara, and thus entered a conviction against the two appellants for this crime. Their sentences of life imprisonment were affirmed.
- Drago Nikolić - his convictions for aiding and abetting genocide, and crimes against humanity and violations of the laws or customs of war through his participation in a joint criminal enterprise were upheld. The chamber reversed his convictions for the killing of six Bosnian Muslim men near Trnovo. His sentence of 35 years of imprisonment was affirmed.
- Radivoje Miletić - found guilty of crimes against humanity and violations of the laws or customs of war, through his participation in a joint criminal enterprise. The chamber also reversed his convictions for persecution and inhumane acts (forcible transfer) as crimes against humanity in connection with the forcible transfer of the Bosnian Muslim men who crossed the Drina River, fleeing Žepa. It also granted in part his ground of appeal concerning sentencing, recognizing that the trial chamber erred in law by considering his use of authority within the VRS Main Staff as an aggravating circumstance. The chamber also granted the prosecution's ground of appeal regarding "opportunistic" killings in Potočari, and entered a conviction against Miletić for murder as a violation of the laws or customs of war for these killings. His sentence of 19 years of imprisonment was reduced to 18 years of imprisonment.
- Vinko Pandurević - found guilty of aiding and abetting violations of the laws or customs of war and crimes against humanity. He was also found guilty of failing to prevent and punish the crimes of his subordinates. The chamber granted the prosecution's appeal regarding a variety of incidents, and entered a number of new convictions. Pandurević was thus found guilty as an aider and abettor or through command responsibility, in relation to various criminal acts, of murder as a violation of the laws or customs of war, extermination as a crime against humanity, and persecution through murder and through cruel and inhumane treatment as a crime against humanity. The chamber entered new convictions for these crimes, and also set aside some of Pandurević's convictions at trial. In dismissing one of Pandurević's challenges regarding aiding and abetting, the chamber recalled that "specific direction" is not an element of aiding and abetting under customary international law. His sentence of 13 years of imprisonment was affirmed.

==== Karadžić case ====
Radovan Karadžić (accused of genocide and complicity in genocide in several municipalities within Bosnia and Herzegovina, initially including: Bijeljina, Bratunac, Bosanski Šamac, Brčko, Doboj, Foča, Ilijaš, Ključ, Kotor Varoš, Bosanski Novi, Prijedor, Rogatica, Sanski Most, Srebrenica, Višegrad, Vlasenica, Zavidovići and Zvornik, but later excluding Brčko, Kotor Varoš and Višegrad). Karadžić was arrested in Belgrade on 21 July 2008, and was transferred into the ICTY custody in the Hague nine days later on 30 July. Karadžić declined to enter a plea at his first appearance before the war crimes tribunal on 31 July 2008, a formal plea of "not guilty" was then made on his behalf by the judges. His trial commenced on 26 October 2009. Karadžić insists on defending himself (as he is entitled to under the United Nations court's rules) while at the same time is setting up a team of legal advisers.

On 28 June 2012 the Trial Chamber made its oral ruling on motion for a judgement of acquittal, pursuant to Rule 98 bis of the Tribunal's Rules of Procedure and Evidence, where it granted Karadžić's motion in relation to count one of the indictment in which he was charged with genocide for the crimes committed between 31 March 1992 and 31 December 1992 in several municipalities of Bosnia and Herzegovina, leaving only the case of Srebrenica as a count of genocide. On 11 July 2013 the Appeals Chamber reversed the Trial Chamber's acquittal of Karadžić for genocide under Count 1 of the Indictment, and remanded the matter to the Trial Chamber. The Appeals Chamber found that the Trial Chamber erred in fact in concluding that there was no evidence, taken at its highest, based upon which a reasonable trier of fact could be satisfied that Karadžić and other alleged JCE members possessed genocidal intent, and that this error resulted in a miscarriage of justice.

===== Trial verdict =====
On 24 March 2016 the Trial Chamber of the ICTY delivered its first-instance verdict against the accused. With regards to the counts of genocide, it found Karadžić not guilty on count 1, since it was not satisfied that genocide was committed in the seven municipalities, namely Bratunac, Foča, Ključ, Prijedor, Sanski Most, Vlasenica, and Zvornik, where the alleged persecutory campaign included or escalated to include conduct and intent which amounted to genocide. In relation to count 2, the Trial Chamber found Karadžić responsible for genocide on the basis of his participation in the Srebrenica joint criminal enterprise.

It has been argued that the first-instance verdict against Karadžić, in relation to his conviction for the crime of genocide, "demonstrates an evolution in judicial interpretation of the [Genocide] Convention, as ICTY judges in Karadžić appear more willing to infer genocidal intent and to embrace a generally broader view of the Convention".

==== Mladić case ====
Ratko Mladic was indicted On July 24, 1995 (amended on 10 October 2002) by the Prosecutor ICTY and accused of genocide and complicity in genocide in several municipalities within Bosnia and Herzegovina, including Ključ, Kotor Varoš, Prijedor, Sanski Most, Srebrenica, Banja Luka, Bosanska Krupa, Bratunac, Vlasenica and Zvornik. On May 31, 2011, Mladić was extradited to The Hague, where he was processed at the detention center that holds suspects for the International Criminal Tribunal for the former Yugoslavia (ITCY). On 4 July 2011 Mladić failed to enter a plea, after which a plea of not guilty was entered on his behalf, while on 8 December 2011 he pleaded not guilty (to the new charge in the third amended indictment). His trial commenced on 16 May 2012. On 15 April 2014 the Trial Chamber I rejected in their entirety Mladić's submissions for acquittal made under Rule 98 bis of the Tribunal's Rules of Procedure and Evidence, relating to two counts of genocide and charges relating to a number of individual crimes in various other counts of the indictment.

==== Tolimir case ====
On 31 May 2007, Zdravko Tolimir (aka: 'Chemical Tolimir'), long time fugitive and a former Assistant Commander for Intelligence and Security of the VRS Main Staff who reported directly to the Commander of the Main Staff, Ratko Mladic, and who had been indicted by the Prosecutor of the ICTY on genocide charges in the 1992–95 Bosnia war was arrested by Serbian and Bosnian police. Tolimir is infamous for issuing request to use chemical weapons during genocide to gas civilians so Bosnian troops could surrender. Tolimir is thought to be one of the main organizers of the network helping top war crimes indictee Ratko Mladić elude justice.

On 3 July 2007 Tolimir did not enter a plea, after which a plea of not guilty was entered on his behalf, while on 16 December 2009 he pleaded not guilty to new charges. His trial commenced on 26 February 2010. The trial chamber issued its judgment on 12 December 2012 by which it found Tolimir guilty, among other things, of genocide and conspiracy to commit genocide. He was sentenced to life imprisonment.

==== Genocide convictions overturned on appeal ====
- Vidoje Blagojević (Srebrenica) is a former commander of the Bratunac Brigade of the Republika Srpska Army. He was captured on August 10, 2001, and soon interned at the ICTY at the Hague. Blagojević was tried along with Dragan Jokic. Both pleaded not guilty. In January 2005 Blagojević was acquitted of the charge of extermination as a crime against humanity, however he was found guilty of the other charges, including complicity to commit genocide by aiding and abetting genocide. He was sentenced to 18 years in prison. On May 9, 2007, the ICTY's appeals court reversed the genocide conviction and reduced his sentence to 15 years which he is currently serving in prison.

==== Plea bargains ====
Individuals indicted by ICTY for genocide in which such charges were withdrawn, with the accused pleading guilty to crimes against humanity:

- Momir Nikolić was indicted by the Prosecutor of the ICTY 26 March 2002 charged with genocide or alternately complicity in genocide and persecutions, and Violations of the Laws or Customs of War. He was arrested by SFOR on 1 April 2002 and transferred to ICTY custody the following day. Nikolic made his initial appearance on 3 April 2002, pleading not guilty on all counts. A plea agreement was reached on 7 May 2003, and Nikolic pleaded guilty to Count 5 of the indictment - Crimes against humanity.
- Dragan Obrenović was indicted by the International Criminal Tribunal for the Former Yugoslavia in The Hague on 1 November 1998 for complicity in genocide, extermination, persecution, and two counts of murder. On 15 April 2001, he was arrested by SFOR personnel, and was transferred that same day to the Hague, he entered not-guilty pleas across the board at his arraignment on the 18th. On 20 May 2003, Obrenovic entered a plea agreement with the ICTY prosecutor's office. He pleaded guilty to one count of persecution, and in exchange for truthful allocation to his role in the Srebrenica Massacre and his testimony against his co-accused (his indictment was to be joined with that of four others on 27 May) he was promised a reduced sentence. On 10 December 2003, Obrenovic was sentenced to 17 years in prison, with 969 days credit for time served. He is currently serving out his sentence in Norway and will be eligible for release in April 2018.
- Biljana Plavšić The ICTY indictment charged her with two counts of genocide, five counts of crimes against humanity, and one count of war crimes. She voluntarily surrendered to the ICTY on 10 January 2001, and was provisionally released on 6 September. On 16 December 2002, she plea bargained with the ICTY to enter a guilty plea to one count of crimes against humanity for her part in directing the war and targeting civilians and expressed "full remorse" in exchange for prosecutors dropping the other charges. She was later sentenced to 11 years in prison, and started her sentence on 26 June 2003. After serving six years of her sentence at the women's prison Hinseberg in Örebro, Sweden, she was released on 27 October 2009.

==== Other outcomes and pending cases ====
Died while on trial

- Slobodan Milošević was accused of genocide or complicity in genocide in territories within Bosnia and Herzegovina, including: Bijeljina, Bosanski Novi, Brčko, Ključ, Kotor Varoš, Prijedor, Sanski Most and Srebrenica. On 16 June 2004 the trial chamber has, after the Prosecution had closed its case, made a Decision on Motion for Judgment of Acquittal in which it had dismissed the Motion of Amici Curiae filed pursuant to the Rule 98bis of the Rules of Procedure and Evidence, which asked the trial chamber to acquit the accused because prosecution did not present sufficient evidence on which a court could reach a guilty verdict in relation to genocide charges. Thus the proceedings continued with defense presenting its argument, however Milošević died on 11 March 2006 during his trial.
- Milan Kovačević was accused of genocide, complicity to commit genocide and several counts of crimes against humanity, violations of the laws of war and grave breaches of the Geneva conventions of 1949. He died of natural causes in detention in 1998.

Found guilty of other crimes

- Goran Jelisić, in 1999, pleaded guilty to the charges of crimes against humanity and violating the laws and customs of war and pleaded not guilty to genocide. The Trial Chamber found that, despite discriminatory intent and the commission of acts within the definition of the actus reus of genocide, Jelisić did not have the requisite intent to destroy in whole or in part the Muslim group from Brčko. He was sentenced to 40 years imprisonment. The Appeals Chamber, among other things, held that the Trial Chamber's erroneous application of the standard under Rule 98 bis(B) led to an incorrect assessment of the evidence as insufficient to sustain a conviction for genocide, but it did not consider it appropriate to reverse the acquittal and to remit the case for further proceedings, since a retrial would only be limited to the question of whether Jelisić possessed the genocidal intent, and thus it affirmed the sentence. On 29 May 2003, Jelisić was transferred to Italy to serve the remainder of his sentence with credit for time served since his arrest on 22 January 1998.
- Momcilo Krajišnik was indicted by the ICTY and accused of genocide, complicity in genocide, crimes against humanity (namely extermination, murder, persecution, deportation, and forced transfer), and various war crimes, in relation to acts committed in 1992 in Bosnia and Herzegovina. He was arrested on April 3, 2000, by SFOR. After the death of Slobodan Milosevic, Krajisnik was the highest-ranking politician on trial at the ICTY. On 27 September 2006, Krajisnik was convicted of the following crimes against humanity: extermination, murder, persecution, deportation, and forced transfer. He was acquitted of the charges of murder as a war crime, genocide, and complicity in genocide. He was sentenced to 27 years imprisonment. On 17 March 2009 the ICTY Appeals Chamber reversed some of the Trial Chamber's convictions for crimes against humanity and reduced Krajisnik's sentence to 20 years. Krajisnik was transferred to the United Kingdom to serve his sentence.
- Milomir Stakić (Prijedor). In ICTY indictment Stakić was charged with genocide, or alternatively complicity in genocide, murder as a crime against humanity, extermination, murder as a violation of the laws or customs of war, persecutions, deportation, and inhumane acts. On 31 July 2003 the Trial Chamber found him not guilty of genocide, complicity in genocide, or forcible transfer (a crime against humanity). He was found guilty of: extermination, (a crime against humanity); murder, (a violation of the laws and customs of war); and persecutions (crimes against humanity, incorporating murder, and deportation both of which were also crimes against humanity). He was sentenced to life imprisonment with a minimum term of 20 years. The Appeals Chamber affirmed the Trial Chamber's decision to convict Stakić for his responsibility in exterminating, murdering and persecuting the non-Serb population in Prijedor. The Appeals Chamber also found that the Trial Chamber incorrectly failed to convict him for deporting and forcibly transferring the non-Serb population. The Appeals Chamber agreed with the Trial Chamber's decision to acquit Milomir Stakić of genocide and complicity in genocide. The Appeals Chamber indicated that "[w]ithout question, the Trial Chamber made factual findings which could, in principle, be taken as evidence that the Appellant intended to destroy the Bosnian Muslim group in part, including those identified by the Prosecution", but that it "cannot conclude that the evidence in this case is so unambiguous that a reasonable Trial Chamber was obliged to infer that intent was established beyond a reasonable doubt". The Appeals Chamber found that Stakić participated in a joint criminal enterprise whose purpose was to commit crimes against the Bosnian Muslim and Bosnian Croat populations of Prijedor. These crimes were part of a campaign to persecute the non-Serb population of Prijedor, with the final goal of creating a Serbian municipality eventually to form part of an envisaged pure Serbian state. He was sentenced to 40 years' imprisonment.

=== Judiciary in Bosnia and Herzegovina ===
Before the establishment of the State Court of Bosnia and Herzegovina, there were several indictments for the crime of genocide, however only one inductee, Borislav Herak, has been found guilty of genocide. Since 2003 no indictments were filed for genocide before the local courts of Bosnia and Herzegovina, other than the Court of Bosnia and Herzegovina.

==== Rulings before the establishment of the Court of Bosnia and Herzegovina ====
- Borislav Herak and Sretko Damjanović - on 7 February 1993 the District Military Prosecutor's Office in Sarajevo filed an indictment with the District Military Court in Sarajevo against Herak, for genocide, war crimes against civilian population and war crimes against POWs, for crimes committed while he was a member of "Bioča Company" and "Kremeš Company", Damjanović (for genocide, war crimes against civilian population), for crimes committed while he was a member of "Kremeš Company" and Nada Tomić (for concealment of crime). In March 1993, by a judgment of District Military Court they were found guilty of all the offenses and Herak and Damjanović were sentenced to death. In July 1993, the second instance court partially accepted the appeals of defense lawyers, but upheld the first instance judgment with regards the finding of guilt for all the crimes and the penalties made. The third instance court, in December 1993, rejected the appeals of the defense layers and confirmed the judgment of the second instance court. After further procedural process, a retrial of Damjanović was ordered pursuant to the decision of the Human Rights Chamber for B&H and during the retrial Damjanović was acquitted of the charges of genocide. On appeal the court upheld the acquittal for genocide with regards Damjanović, as well as the sentence of 9 years imprisonment for other crimes. All the requests for retrial of Herak were rejected, making him the only person convicted of genocide by the local court in B&H before the establishment of the Court of Bosnia and Herzegovina,. Herak's death penalty was altered to 20 years imprisonment, and he was released from prison in August 2012.
- Tešić Tešo and Borović Dušan - on 22 July 1996 Tešić, a member of paramilitary Vlasenica Brigade, and Borović, a member of volunteer units from Serbia, were indicted by the Higher Public Prosecutor's Office in Sarajevo since it was alleged that they "participated and organized systematic destruction of people, members of non-Serbian nationality", and thus committed the crime of genocide (under the Criminal Code of SFRY, or FBiH as adopted by the decree law) in northern part of Vlasenica Municipality and Bijeljina and Zvornik respectively. The Cantonal Court in Tuzla, on 19 September 1997, acquitted the accused of the charges since the charges were not proven, and this judgment was confirmed by the Supreme Court of the Federation of Bosnia and Herzegovina on 1 August 2000.
- Čančar Veselin - on 11 November 1996 Čančar, a reserve captain of the JNA, was indicted by the Higher Public Prosecutor's Office in Sarajevo for, among other things, allegedly committing genocide on the territory of Foča. On 9 January 1998 the genocide charge was removed from the indictment, and the accused was finally found guilty of committing war crimes against civilian population.

==== The Court of Bosnia and Herzegovina ====
So far the Prosecutor's office of Bosnia and Herzegovina has only filed indictments for the crime of genocide relating to the Srebrenica massacre, stating that "investigations have not shown elements of genocide for any other areas [than Srebrenica]". Many analysts, indicate that the reasons for that lie in the fact that prosecutors are not willing to stray from the case law of ICTY, but Erna Mackic writing in BIRN BiH in November 2009 stated that "some rights activists believe this may change" once the ICTY trial of Radovan Karadžić is over.

===== Arrested =====
- Marko Boškić - on 25 August 2004, United States Immigration and Customs Enforcement agents arrested and charged Boškić with fraud and misuse of visas, permits and other documents. In 2006, he was sentenced to 63 months in prison for immigration fraud offenses. Subsequently, on 29 April 2010, he was extradited to Bosnia and Herzegovina and handed over to members of SIPA (State Investigation and Protection Agency) and is to be charged for the alleged participation in Srebrenica genocide. In July 2010, he was sentenced to 10 years in prison for crimes against humanity.
- Dragan Nešković - On 25 August 2010, State Investigation and Protection Agency had arrested Nešković in Bijeljina on suspicion of participation in Srebrenica genocide.
- Branko Popić - was detained by United States Immigration and Customs Enforcement (ICE) Enforcement and Removal Operations (ERO) officers for suspicion of participating in Srebrenica genocide. He was deported to Bosnia and Herzegovina.
- Dejan Radojković - was arrested in January 2009 in USA, and was deported in 2012 to Bosnia and Herzegovina to face the charges of his alleged participation in the Srebrenica genocide.
- Milorad Obradovic - was arrested in Munich, Germany in January 2018 for suspected activity in the numerous kidnappings, illegal imprisonments and murders of Bosnian Muslims in the Prijedor region of Bosnia in the spring and summer of 1992.
- Nine former Bosnian Serb military officers and troops were arrested in Bosnia on September 16, 2020, for suspected of involvement in the killings of 44 Muslim Bosniak civilians during the 1992-95 Bosnian War.
- Dusan Culibrk- was arrested in Bosnia in November 2020 on charges of taking part in the killing of 51 non-Serb civilians in northwestern Bosnia and Herzegovina early in the war in the 1990s
- Seven former Bosnian Serb military and police officials were arrested in Bosnia on December 8, 2020, on charges of unlawfully imprisoning and torturing 150 Bosniak and Croat civilians around the central Bosnian town of Donji Vakuf in the spring and summer of 1992.

===== Indicted to stand trial =====
- Nedeljko Milidragović and Aleksa Golijanin - on 19 July 2012, the Court of Bosnia and Herzegovina confirmed the indictment under which both of the accused were charged with the criminal offense of genocide committed in Srebrenica in the period from 10 to 19 July 1995. At the relevant period Milidragović was a commander of the 2nd platoon of the 1st Company, Jahorina Training Center of the Special Police Brigade of the RS Ministry of Interior (SBP of the RS MUP), while Golijanin was a Deputy Commander of the 3rd Platoon of the 1st Company, Jahorina Training Center of SBP of the RS MUP. Neither of the accused were in custody, and the available data suggested that Milidragović lived in Belgrade, while Golijanin resided in Sremska Kamenica, both in Serbia. On 18 March 2015 both were arrested in Serbia.
- Srećko Aćimović - the Court of Bosnia and Herzegovina confirmed the indictment against the accused on 28 December 2015, charging him with the criminal offense of genocide in Srebrenica, through aiding and abetting.
- Tomislav Kovač - the Prosecutor's Office of Bosnia and Herzegovina indicted the accused for genocide in Srebrenica on 29 December 2017. The indictment was sent to the Court of Bosnia and Herzegovina for confirmation.
- On 28 December 2017, 14 Bosnian Muslims were indicted the Bosnian government for crimes against Serbs.
- Former Bosnian-Serb general Milomir Savcic was indicted on charges of genocide near Srebrenica on December 31, 2019.
- Ranko Radulovic - the Montenegrin citizen and former Bosnian Serb fighter was charged in September 2020 with crimes against humanity for involvement in attacking Bosniaks, rape, hostage-taking and property destruction in the Foca area of Bosnia in 1992.

===== Mitrović and others case ("Kravice") =====
====== The First Instance Verdict ======
On 29 July 2008, after a two-year trial, the Section I for War Crimes of the Court of Bosnia and Herzegovina found seven men guilty of genocide for their role in the Srebrenica massacre including the deaths of 1000 Bosniak men in a single day. In the trial verdict the Court found that the accused Milenko Trifunović, Aleksandar Radovanović, Brano Džinić, Slobodan Jakovljević and Branislav Medan, by their actions as co-perpetrators (not as members of JCE), committed the criminal offence of Genocide in violation of Article 171(a) in conjunction with Articles 29 and 180(1) of the Criminal Code of BiH (CC of BiH), while the Accused Miloš Stupar was found guilty of the criminal offence of Genocide under the command responsibility, in violation of Article 171(a) in conjunction with Article 180 (2) of the CC of BiH, since he acted with genocidal intent when failing to punish his subordinates. The court found that Bosniak men trying to escape from Srebrenica had been told they would be kept safe if they surrendered. Instead, they were transported to an agricultural co-operative in the village of Kravica, and latter executed en masse.

Found guilty of genocide (29 July 2008)

- Milos Stupar (commander of the 2nd Special Police Šekovići Squad) – found guilty, sentenced to 40 years.
- Milenko Trifunovic (commander of the 3rd "Skelani" Platoon, part of the 2nd Special Police Šekovići Squad) – found guilty, sentenced to 42 years.
- Brano Dzinic (a special police force officer of the 2nd Special Police Šekovići Squad) – found guilty, sentenced to 42 years.
- Slobodan Jakovljevic (special police force members of the 3rd "Skelani" Platoon) – found guilty, sentenced to 40 years.
- Branislav Medan (special police force members of the 3rd "Skelani" Platoon) – found guilty, sentenced to 40 years.
- Petar Mitrovic (special police force members of the 3rd "Skelani" Platoon) – found guilty, sentenced to 38 years.
- Aleksandar Radovanovic (special police force members of the 3rd "Skelani" Platoon) – found guilty, sentenced to 42 years.

Acquitted

- Velibor Maksimovic (special police force members of the 3rd "Skelani" Platoon) – acquitted.
- Milovan Matic (a member of RSA) – acquitted.
- Miladin Stevanovic (special police force members of the 3rd "Skelani" Platoon) – acquitted.
- Dragisa Zivanovic (special police force members of the 3rd "Skelani" Platoon) – acquitted.

====== The Appellate Panel verdict, decisions of the Constitutional Court and retrial ======
- Milovan Matić - the Appellate Panel upheld the trial verdict, and thus refused as unfounded the appeal filed by the Prosecutor.
- Miloš Stupar - the Appellate Panel revoked the trial verdict and ordered a retrial before the panel of the Appellate Division of Section I of the Court of Bosnia and Herzegovina.
- Milenko Trifunović, Brane Džinić, Aleksandar Radovanović, Slobodan Jakovljević, Branislav Medan - the Appellate Panel ruled that trial verdict is altered in the sense that the accused, being aware of the existence of the genocidal plan of others, performed the actions by which they considerably contributed to the commission of that offense, and therefore they participated in the criminal offense of Genocide as accessories (not as co-perpetrators), since it was not proven beyond reasonable doubt that the accused themselves acted with genocidal intent. Hence, Trifunović was sentenced to 33 years, Džinić to 32 years, Radovanović to 32 years, Jakovljević to 28 years and Medan to 28 years.

Finally, the Appellate Panel underlined that it is "indisputable that genocide was committed in Srebrenica in July 1995. Due to its nature, that crime could not have been committed by a single individual, but it had to include an active participation of a number of persons, each of whom having a role. However, it is evident that not all participants in the events in Srebrenica at the referenced time acted with the identical state of mind, nor did they take the same actions."

On 22 October 2013 the Constitutional Court of Bosnia and Herzegovina upheld the appeals of Milenko Trifunović, Aleksandar Radovanović, Brano Džinić, Slobodan Jakovljević, Petar Mitrović and Branislav Medan, finding that the Court of Bosnia and Herzegovina had violated their rights from Article 7 of the European Convention of Human Rights, when it applied the new Criminal Code of Bosnia and Herzegovina, instead of the one that was in force when the crime of genocide was committed. The cases were remanded to the Court of Bosnia and Herzegovina for a new trial. Pursuant to the decision of the Constitutional Court the Court of Bosnia and Herzegovina terminated the execution of the sanction of imprisonment for the accused and released them from prison before the initiation of new trials.

On 29 April 2014 the Panel of the Section I for War Crimes of the Appeals Division of the Court of BiH delivered a judgment granting in part the appeals filed after the decision of the Constitutional Court of Bosnia and Herzegovina, thus revising the first instance verdict of 29 July 2008 regarding the legal qualification of the offense, and finding the accused guilty of the criminal offense of genocide under Article 141 of the Criminal Code of SFRY as read with Article 24 (aiding and abetting) of the said Code, and sentencing the accused Milenko Trifunović, Brane Džinić, Aleksandar Radovanović, Slobodan Jakovljević and Branislav Medan to 20 years imprisonment each.

====== The Appellate Panel verdict in Mitrović case, decision of the Constitutional Court and retrial ======
In a separate judgment the Appellate Panel partially accepted the appeal of Petar Mitrović and found him guilty of the criminal offense of genocide, but as an accessory (aiding and abetting), and sentenced him to 28 years of imprisonment.

On 22 October 2013 the Constitutional Court of Bosnia and Herzegovina upheld the appeal of Petar Mitrović, finding that the Court of Bosnia and Herzegovina had violated his rights from Article 7 of the European Convention of Human Rights, when it applied the new Criminal Code of Bosnia and Herzegovina, instead of the one that was in force when the crime of genocide was committed. The case was remanded to the Court of Bosnia and Herzegovina for a new trial. Pursuant to the decision of the Constitutional Court the Court of Bosnia and Herzegovina terminated the execution of the sanction of imprisonment for the accused and released him from prison before the initiation of new trial.

The Panel of the Section I for War Crimes of the Appeals Division of the Court of BiH sent out on 29 April 2014 a verdict in this case accepting in part the appeal of defense for the accused, thus revising the previous judgment in relation to its legal qualification, finding the accused Petar Mitrović guilty of the criminal offense of genocide, now under the Criminal Code of SFRY, as an accessory (aiding and abetting), and sentencing him to 20 years imprisonment.

====== Retrial in Miloš Stupar case ======
Stupar, who allegedly acted as the Commander of the 2nd Šekovići Detachment of the Special Police, was charged for the crime of genocide under the command responsibility since he allegedly failed to take the necessary and reasonable measures to prevent members of his Detachment from taking part in the perpetration of genocide in Srebrenica, and following the perpetration of the offense he failed to take the necessary steps to punish them.

Stupar was found guilty in the first instance verdict, of 29 July 2009, but the Appellate Panel of the Section I for War Crimes, by its verdict on 9 September 2009, modified the trial verdict in its sentencing part and, among other things, ordered a retrial with regards Stupar before the panel of the Appellate Division of Section I of the Court of Bosnia and Herzegovina. The Appellate Division made its verdict on 5 May 2010 by which it had acquired Stupar of all charges, since he was not de facto or de jure Commander of the 2nd Šekovići Detachment of the Special Police and since he did not have the effective control over the perpetrators of the crimes.

===== Milorad Trbić case =====
====== First instance verdict ======
Milorad Trbić, a former reserve Captain of the Zvornik brigade of the army of the Republika Srpska, was charged with genocide pursuant to Article 171 of the Criminal Code of Bosnia and Herzegovina (CC BiH) in conjunction with the killing members of the group, causing serious bodily or mental harm to members of the group, deliberately inflicting on the group conditions of life calculated to bring about its physical destruction in whole or in part, imposing measures intended to prevent births within the group. On 16 October 2009 Court of Bosnia and Herzegovina, in a first instance verdict, found Milorad Trbić directly responsible for the crimes he committed as part of a joint criminal enterprise to destroy all the Bosniaks brought into his area of responsibility during the period following the fall of Srebrenica. The Court sentenced Trbić for his participation in the crimes to thirty years imprisonment.

====== Second instance verdict ======
On 16 October 2009 the Appellate Panel of the Court of Bosnia and Herzegovina, following a public hearing, refused as unfounded the appeals submitted by the Prosecutor's Office of Bosnia and Herzegovina, and the Defence Counsel, and confirmed the verdict and the sentence in its entirety.

====== Decision of the Constitutional Court and retrial ======
On 6 November 2014 the Constitutional Court of Bosnia and Herzegovina upheld the appeal of Milorad Trbić finding that the Court of Bosnia and Herzegovina had violated his rights from Article 7 of the European Convention of Human Rights, when it applied the new Criminal Code of Bosnia and Herzegovina, instead of the one that was in force when the crime of genocide was committed. The case was remanded to the Court of Bosnia and Herzegovina for a new trial. After the decision of the Constitutional Court the Panel of the Appellate Division of Section I for War Crimes of the Court of Bosnia and Herzegovina on 3 February 2015 sent out the Verdict dated 19 January 2015 under which the judgment of the first instance court is revised in terms of the application of the Criminal Code and decision as to the sanction and so the actions for which Trbić is found guilty under the first-instance judgment are defined as the criminal offense of Genocide in violation of Article 141 of the Criminal Code of the Socialist Federative Republic of Yugoslavia taken over based on the Law on Application of the Criminal Code of Bosnia and Herzegovina and Criminal Code of the Socialist Federative Republic of Yugoslavia as read with Article 22 (co-perpetration) of the said Code. The Court revised the judgment in terms of the sanction as well, and so pronounced on Trbić a prison sentence for a term of twenty years. The remaining part of the judgment of the first-instance court remained unchanged.

===== Radomir Vuković et al case =====
====== First instance verdict and second instance order for retrial ======
On 21 October 2008 the Court issued a Decision on the joinder of cases of Radomir Vuković (X-KR-06/180-2) and Zoran Tomić (X-KR-08/552), and the main trial commenced on 4 December 2008. Both were charged with the criminal offense of genocide, and both pleaded not guilty. On 22 April 2010 the Court of Bosnia and Herzegovina pronounced the first-instance verdict finding both the accused guilty of knowingly assisting in the perpetration of the crime of genocide because, as members of the special police force of the 2nd Detachment of the Šekovići Special Police of the Republika Srpska MUP, they participated in keeping the road passable during the transportation of Bosniaks by trucks and buses, for later capturing a large number of Bosniak men who attempted to escape from the UN Safe Area and taking them to Kravica Farming Cooperative where they participated in their execution. They were each sentenced to a long term imprisonment of 31 years. On 11 May 2011 the Panel of the Court's Appellate Division of the Section I for War Crimes, following a public session, delivered an Appellate Decision revoking the Trial Verdict and ordering a retrial before the Appellate Panel.

====== Second instance verdict ======
On 25 January 2012 the Chamber of the Appellate Division of the Section I for War Crimes, following a public session, delivered the second-instance verdict by which Radomir Vuković was found guilty of perpetrating the criminal offense of aiding and abetting in genocide, and was sentenced to long-term imprisonment of 31 years. Zoran Tomić was acquitted.

====== Decision of the Constitutional Court and retrial ======
On 27 October 2015 the Constitutional Court of Bosnia and Herzegovina upheld the appeal of Radomir Vuković finding that the Court of Bosnia and Herzegovina had violated his rights from Article 7 of the European Convention of Human Rights, when it applied the new Criminal Code of Bosnia and Herzegovina, instead of the one that was in force when the crime of genocide was committed. The case was remanded to the Court of Bosnia and Herzegovina for a new trial. After the decision of the Constitutional Court the Panel of the Appellate Division of Section I for War Crimes of the Court of Bosnia and Herzegovina on 17 December 2015 sent out the Verdict under which the judgment of the first instance court is revised in terms of the application of the Criminal Code and decision as to the sanction and so the actions for which Vuković is found guilty under the first-instance judgment are defined as the criminal offense of Genocide in violation of Article 141 of the Criminal Code of the Socialist Federative Republic of Yugoslavia taken over based on the Law on Application of the Criminal Code of Bosnia and Herzegovina and Criminal Code of the Socialist Federative Republic of Yugoslavia. The Court revised the judgment in terms of the sanction as well, and so pronounced on Vuković a prison sentence for a term of twenty years. The remaining part of the judgment of the first-instance court remained unchanged.

===== Momir Pelemiš and Slavko Perić =====
====== First instance verdict ======
The accused Momir Pelemiš acted as Deputy Commander of the 1st Battalion of the 1st Zvornik Infantry Brigade (1st Battalion), and as Acting Commander of the 1st Battalion in the period between July 9 and 21, 1995, whereas in the period between July 14 and 17, 1995, the accused Slavko Perić acted as Assistant Commander for Security and Intelligence in the 1st Battalion. The court confirmed the indictment against the accused on 28 November 2008, charging both the accused for genocide. At a plea hearing before Section I for War Crimes of the Court, held on 16 January 2009, both of the accused pleaded not guilty, and the main trial commenced on 10 March 2009.

On 31 October 2011, the Trial Panel of the Section 1 of the Court of Bosnia and Herzegovina announced the first-instance verdict, sentencing Momir Pelemiš and Slavko Perić to 16 and 19 years of prison respectively for the criminal offense of genocide, finding that the accused knowingly provided assistance to members of the joint criminal enterprise aimed at killing the able-bodied Bosniak men from Srebrenica, during a widespread and systematic attack carried out on the UN safe area in Srebrenica between 10 July and 1 November 1995 by members of the Republika Srpska Army and the RS MUP.

====== Second instance verdict ======
On 26 December 2012 the Chamber of the Appellate Division of the Section I for War Crimes, following a public session, delivered the second-instance verdict by which it revoked the Trial Verdict with regards the accused Momir Pelemiš and ordered a retrial before the appeals chamber. It also partially changed the judgment against Branko Perić, such that he is re-sentenced to 11 years imprisonment.

====== Retrial in Momir Pelemiš case ======
The main trial before the Panel of the Section I for War Crimes of the Appellate Division of the Court of BIH was initiated on 14 February 2013, and the second-instance verdict was pronounced on 13 June 2013. The Appellate Division found the accused not guilty of the crime of genocide.

===== Duško Jević et al case =====
====== First instance verdict ======
On 22 January 2010 the Court of Bosnia and Herzegovina confirmed the Indictment in the Duško Jević et al. case, charging the accused Duško Jević, Mendeljev Đurić and Goran Marković with the criminal offense of genocide, in relation to Srebrenica massacre. On 19 April 2010 the Court issued a Decision on merging this case with the case against Neđo Ikonić, against whom the Court issued, on 21 January 2010, a decision ordering the accused into one-month custody, after he was arrested in the United States of America and extradited to Bosnia and Herzegovina, and against whom it had later confirmed the indictment, charging the accused with the criminal offense of genocide in Srebrenica. Ikonić pleaded not guilty to the charges. Accused Jević was at the relevant time in the capacity of Deputy Commander of the Special Police Brigade of the MUP RS and the Commander of the Training Center of the Special Police Brigade Jahorina; the accused Đurić, in the capacity of the Commanding Officer of the 1st Company of the Training Center Jahorina; the accused Marković, in the capacity of the Commanding Officer of the 2nd Platoon of the 1st Company of the Training Center Jahorina and the accused Ikonić, in the capacity of the Commanding Officer of the 2nd Company of the Training Center Jahorina of the MUP RS Special Police Brigade.

On 25 May 2012 the Section I for War Crimes of the Court of Bosnia and Herzegovina pronounced the first-instance verdict in which it had found the accused Jević and Đurić guilty for willingly aiding members of the joint criminal enterprise to commit genocide in Srebrenica, while Ikonić and Marković were found not guilty for the charged crimes. Jević was sentenced to 35 and Đurić to 30 years imprisonment.

====== Second instance verdict ======
On 16 August 2013 the Appellate Panel of the Section I for War Crimes of the Court of Bosnia and Herzegovina delivered its second instance verdict by which it had reduced the long-term imprisonment sentence of the accused Jević to 32 years and of the accused Đurić to 28 years, refusing as ill-founded the appeal filed by the Prosecutor's Office of Bosnia and Herzegovina.

===== Željko Ivanović case =====
====== First instance verdict and second instance order for retrial ======
The accused Željko Ivanović was charged with a criminal offense of genocide, in which he allegedly participated as a member of the Special Police Unit of the 2nd Šekovići Detachment, RS MoI, during the period from 10 to 19 July 1995 in and around Srebrenica. On 29 June 2009 the accused pleaded not guilty to the charge of genocide. On 24 April 2012 the Trial Panel of the Section I for War Crimes of the Court of BiH pronounced a Trial Verdict finding the accused guilty of the criminal offense of crimes against humanity and had sentenced the accused to imprisonment for a term of 13 years. The prosecution moved the Appellate Panel of the Court to grant its appeal, revoke the contested verdict and schedule a retrial, or to alter the verdict by finding the accused guilty of the criminal offense of genocide, while the defense appealed as well. On 5 December 2012, the Panel of Section I for War Crimes of the Appellate Division of the Court of BiH granted the appeals of the prosecutor and the defense, and revoked the first instance verdict of the Court and scheduled a retrial before the Panel of the Appellate Division.

====== Second instance verdict ======
On 17 June 2003 the Appeals Panel of the Court of Bosnia and Herzegovina found the accused guilty of the crime of genocide, as an accessory, and had sentenced him to a 24-year long-term imprisonment.

====== Decision of the Constitutional Court and retrial ======
On 28 March 2014 the Constitutional Court of Bosnia and Herzegovina upheld the appeal of Željko Ivanović finding that the Court of Bosnia and Herzegovina had violated his rights from Article 7 of the European Convention of Human Rights, when it applied the new Criminal Code of Bosnia and Herzegovina, instead of the one that was in force when the crime of genocide was committed. The case was remanded to the Court of Bosnia and Herzegovina for a new trial. Pursuant to the decision of the Constitutional Court, the Court of Bosnia and Herzegovina terminated the execution of the sanction of imprisonment for the accused and released hom from prison before the initiation of new trial.

After the decision of the Constitutional Court the Panel of the Appellate Division of Section I for War Crimes of the Court of Bosnia and Herzegovina found Ivanović guilty of the criminal offense of genocide, but now under Article 141 of the Criminal Code of the Socialistic Federative Republic of Yugoslavia, taken in conjunction with Article 24 of the same Code (complicity), and sentenced him to 20 years imprisonment.

===== Goran Sarić case =====
On 29 August 2013 the Prosecutor's Office of the Court of Bosnia and Herzegovina charged Sarić for the criminal offense of genocide for the massacre committed in Srebrenica. The Court of Bosnia and Herzegovina confirmed the indictment against Sarić on 9 September 2013.

====== First instance verdict ======
On 16 February 2018 the Panel of Section I for War Crimes of the Court of Bosnia and Herzegovina rendered a judgment acquitting Goran Sarić of the charges for the criminal offense of genocide in Srebrenica.

===== Aleksandar Cvetković case =====
On 18 January 2010 Cvetković was arrested by the Israeli International Investigations Unit as he is suspected to have participated in the Srebrenica genocide. On 15 August 2013 Cvetković was extradited from Israel to Bosnia and Herzegovina to stand the trial on the charges of participation in Srebrenica genocide. The Court of Bosnia and Herzegovina confirmed the indictment against Cvetković on 12 September 2013. He was accused that, as a member of the 10th Sabotage Detachment of the Main Staff of the Army of Republika Srpska, in late June 1995, he participated in the launch of the first attack on the UN safe area of Srebrenica and the UNPROFOR base with the aim to intimidate the Bosniak population, and that, on 11 July 1995, he participated in the military operation "Krivaja -95", or the capture of the UN safe area of Srebrenica. He was also accused that, after the entry into Srebrenica, and after the entire Bosniak population had been expelled from the safe area, on 16 July 1995, at the Branjevo Farming Cooperative, together with other members of the 10th Sabotage Detachment, he fired form an automatic rifle at the detainees gathered in groups of ten men, on which occasion, at least nine hundred detained Bosniak men and young boys from the Srebrenica enclave were summarily executed, and only two detainees survived.

====== First instance verdict ======
The Trial Panel of Section I for War Crimes of the Court of Bosnia and Herzegovina rendered, on 2 July 2015, a verdict acquitting the accused of all the charges for the criminal offense of genocide under Article 171(a) and (b) of the Criminal Code of BiH, as read with Article 29 of the same Code.

===== Stanišić Ostoja and another case =====
Ostoja Stanišić and Marko Milošević were arrested on 21 June 2012, under the allegations of participation in the Srebrenica genocide, through knowingly aiding the perpetration of genocide in the area of the villages Petkovci and Đulići, municipality of Zvornik. On 2 August 2012 the Court of Bosnia and Herzegovina confirmed the indictment against the accused. At the relevant period Ostoja Stanišić was the Commander of the 6th Zvornik Brigade Battalion, while Marko Milošević was the Deputy Commander of the 6th Zvornik Brigade Battalion. On 5 September 2012 both of the accused pleaded not guilty to the charges.

====== First instance verdict ======
The Trial Panel of Section I for War Crimes of the Court of Bosnia and Herzegovina rendered, on 31 March 2017, a verdict by which the accused Ostoja Stanišić was found guilty of the crime of genocide and sentenced to 11 years of imprisonment, while the accused Marko Milošević was acquitted.

===== Josipović case =====
====== First instance verdict ======
By the decision of the Court of Bosnia and Herzegovina of 5 September 2014 suspect Branimir Tešić was ordered into one-month custody, while in relation to the suspect Miodrag Josipović the Court ordered a number of prohibiting measures including the ban on leaving the place of residence (house arrest). Both are suspected of committing the crime of genocide. On 2 October 2014 the Court of Bosnia and Herzegovina confirmed the indictment against both of the accused for the crime of genocide. The indictment alleges that Josipović, in the capacity as the Chief of Public Security Station Bratunac and member of Police Forces Staff of Zvornik Public Security Center quartered in the Public Security Station Bratunac, and Tešić, as Deputy Commander of Bratunac Police Station, in the period from 12 July to 19 July 1995 aided and abetted the partial destruction of Bosniaks from Srebrenica enclave. On 16 December 2014 the Court of Bosnia and Herzegovina confirmed the indictment against the accused Dragomir Vasić, Danilo Zoljić and Radomir Pantićon, charging them with the criminal offense of genocide in Srebrenica, through aiding and abetting. On 29 November the Court of BiH acquitted the accused.

===== Found guilty for other crimes =====
====== Franc Kos et al. case ======
On 12 August 2010 the Court of Bosnia and Herzegovina confirmed the indictment in the "Franc Kos et al. case" charging the accused Franc Kos, Stanko Kojić, Vlastimir Golijan and Zoran Goronja, as members of the 10th Sabotage Detachment of the Main Staff of the Army of Republika Srpska, with the criminal offence of genocide in Srebrenica. At the plea hearing, on 8 September 2010, the accused Vlastimir Golijan pleaded guilty while the accused Kos, Kojić and Goronja pleaded not guilty to the criminal offense of genocide.

On 15 June 2012 the Section I for War Crimes of the Court of BiH delivered its first-instance Verdict, finding that the crime of genocide was committed in Srebrenica in the relevant period, but concluding that all the accused are guilty of crimes against humanity. Stanko Kojić was sentenced to 43, while Franc Kos and Zoran Goronja were both sentenced to 40 years imprisonment. Vlastimir Golijan was sentenced to 19 years imprisonment. On 15 February 2013 the Appellate Panel of the Court of Bosnia and Herzegovina made its judgment rejecting the appeal of the Prosecutor's Office and partially accepting the appeal of the accused, and reduced their sentences. Franc Kos was sentenced to 35 years, Stanko Kojić to 32 years, Vlastimir Golijan to 15 years and Zoran Goronja to 30 years of imprisonment.

====== Božidar Kuvelja case ======
On 17 January 2010 Božidar Kuvelja, a former Police Officer of the II Platoon of the 1st Company of the Jahorina Training Center, was deprived of liberty in the area of Čajniče by order of the Prosecutor of the Special Department for War Crimes within the BiH Prosecutor's Office and is suspected to have participated in the Srebrenica genocide. He was ordered into custody on 19 January 2011. On 4 March 2011 the Prosecutor's Office of Bosnia and Herzegovina had sent the indictment to the Court of Bosnia and Herzegovina for the confirmation. Kuvelja is charged with, among other things, the alleged execution of around one thousand Bosniak man and boys during the Srebrenica genocide. On 9 March 2011 the Court of Bosnia and Herzegovina confirmed the Indictment, charging Kuvelja with the criminal offense of genocide. Kuvelja subsequently pleaded not guilty.

On 11 January 2013 the Trial Panel of the Section I for War Crimes of the Court of BiH pronounced a Trial Verdict finding the accused guilty of crimes against humanity and had sentenced him to 20 years imprisonment. Both the prosecutor and the defense have indicated that they would appeal the judgment. On 19 November 2013 the Court confirmed the first instance judgment, rejecting both the defense and prosecutor's appeal.

===== Plea bargains =====
- Vaso Todorović - the Court confirmed the indictment against him on 2 June 2008, under which it was alleged that Todorović, as a member of the Special Police of the 2nd Šekovići Detachment during the period from 10 July to 19 July 1995, with an intention to partially exterminate a group of Bosniak people, participated in a joint criminal enterprise aimed at forcible relocation of around 40 thousand civilians from the UN Protection Zone Srebrenica, and was charged with the crime of genocide. On 23 June 2008 Todorović pleaded not guilty, and the trial was initiated on 13 October 2010. Todorović made a plea agreement with the Prosecution on 16 October 2010, after which the charge of genocide was replaced by crimes against humanity. On 22 October 2010 he was found guilty of aiding and abetting murder and deportation and forcible transfer as a crime against humanity committed in Srebrenica in July 1995, and was sentenced to six years imprisonment.
- Dragan Crnogorac - on 15 November 2010, Crnogorac was deprived of liberty in Banja Luka by order of the Prosecutor of the Special Department for War Crimes within the BiH Prosecutor's Office and is suspected to have, as a member of the police forces of the Jahorina Training Center – a part of the RS MoI, personally participated in the capture of Muslim men in the village of Sendici who had tried to escape Srebrenica and their execution, during the genocide of July 1995. Crnogorac struck a plea bargain after being indicted for genocide, after which he was sentenced to 13 years in prison for crimes against humanity.

=== German prosecutions ===
During the late 1990s the German courts handed down custodial sentences to several individuals who were found guilty by the German courts of participating in genocides in Bosnia. Two of these cases were cited in the judgement handed down by the ICTY against Radislav Krstic, when considering whether the Srebrenica massacre met the United Nations Convention on the Prevention and Punishment of the Crime of Genocide requirement of "in part".

==== Novislav Džajić ====
Novislav Džajić was indicted in Germany for participation in genocide, but the Higher Regional Court failed to find that there was sufficient certainty, for a criminal conviction, that he had intended to commit genocide. Nevertheless, Džajič was found guilty of 14 cases of murder and one case of attempted murder. At Džajić's appeal on 23 May 1997, the Bavarian Appeals Chamber found that acts of genocide were committed in June 1992, confined within the administrative district of Foca.

==== Nikola Jorgić ====
The Higher Regional Court (Oberlandesgericht) of Düsseldorf, in September 1997, handed down a genocide conviction against Nikola Jorgic, a Bosnian Serb from the Doboj region who was the leader of a paramilitary group located in the Doboj region. He was sentenced to four terms of life imprisonment for his involvement in genocidal actions that took place in regions of Bosnia and Herzegovina, other than Srebrenica. His appeal was dismissed by German Federal Constitutional Court.

===== Application before the European Court Of Human Rights =====
On 12 July 2007, European Court of Human Rights dismissed Nikola Jorgic appeal, but highlighted that the German courts had interpreted the German domestic law on genocide more broadly than the more recent rulings by the ICTY and the ICJ.

The ECHR having reviewed the case and the more recent international rulings on the issue held that "the [German] courts' interpretation of 'intent to destroy a group' as not necessitating a physical destruction of the group, which has also been adopted by a number of scholars [...], is therefore covered by the wording, read in its context, of the crime of genocide in the [German] Criminal Code and does not appear unreasonable", and thus it concluded that "while many authorities had favored a narrow interpretation of the crime of genocide, there had already been several authorities at the material time which had construed the offence of genocide in the same wider way as the German courts" and that "[Jorgic], if need be with the assistance of a lawyer, could reasonably have foreseen that he risked being charged with and convicted of genocide for the acts he had committed in 1992.", and for this reason the court rejected Jorgic's assertion that there had been a breach of Article 7 (no punishment without law) of the European Convention on Human Rights by Germany.

==== Maksim Sokolović ====
On 29 November 1999, the Higher Regional Court (Oberlandesgericht) of Düsseldorf condemned Maksim Sokolović to 9 years in prison for aiding and abetting the crime of genocide and for grave breaches of the Geneva Conventions.

==== Đurađ Kušljić ====
In 1999 Đurađ Kušljić was found guilty for committing genocide and sentenced to life-imprisonment by a German court for killing of six Bosniaks and order of expulsion of other non-Serb population while he was police chief of Vrbanjci (municipality Kotor Varoš) in 1992. Qualification of his crimes was changed to complicity in genocide on appeal, but his sentence was unaltered. It has been argued by some legal scholars that the "courts have taken a relatively extensive view" with regards the mental element of genocide in that case.

On 11 January 2006 Kušljić filed an appeal before the Constitutional Court of Bosnia and Herzegovina claiming that his fair trial rights were violated when it was not made possible for him to participate in the procedure before the Ministry of Civil Affairs and Communications of B&H and Ministry of Foreign Affairs of B&H, when it was decided that B&H would not request his extradition regarding the criminal procedure against him for genocide, although in his view B&H had jurisdiction, since he did not even know the procedure was underway. The Court dismissed his appeal for being ratione materiae incompatible with the Constitution of Bosnia and Herzegovina.

=== Austrian prosecutions ===
Duško Cvjetković, who was allegedly a commander of a Bosnian-Serb militia group in Kucice, was arrested in Austria on 19 May 1994. On 27 July 1994 the Prosecutor's Office of Salzburg filed an indictment against Cvjetković for genocide and genocide through aiding and abetting pursuant to §321 (1) first and fourth alternative of the Criminal Code of Austria related to murder and forcible transfer and §12 third alternative of the StGB related to aiding and abetting, murder pursuant to §75 of the Criminal Code of Austria and murder through aiding and abetting pursuant to §§12 third alternative, 75 of the Criminal Code of Austria as well as arson through aiding and abetting pursuant to §12 third alternative, 169 (1) of the Criminal Code of Austria. He was subsequently acquitted by a jury.

=== The Netherlands prosecutions ===
A former UN interpreter, Hasan Nuhanović and the family of Rizo Mustafić, an electrician who worked for the UN Battalion at Srebrenica, have filed a criminal complaint requesting that genocide charges be brought against three Dutch military officials: commander Thom Karremans, his deputy Rob Franken and second in command Berend Oosterveen, because Nuhanović's family members were forced out of UN compound (his father and brother were killed subsequently), as well as Mustafić who is still missing. The public prosecutor in The Netherlands has decided to open an investigation pursuant to the criminal complaint. On 7 March 2013 Dutch authorities decided not to prosecute, while Nuhanović indicated that he would appeal that decision. The families lodged a complaint about the public prosecutor's decision with the Military Chamber of the Court of Appeal of Arnhem-Leeuwarden, but on 29 April 2015 the Court of Appeal dismissed the complaint, finding that prosecutions were unlikely to lead to a conviction. Against the decision by the Court of Appeal the families submitted an application to the European Court of Human Rights complaining that the Court of Appeal had failed to order the criminal prosecution of the three Netherlands servicemen, or at least a criminal investigation into their involvement in the deaths of their relatives. On 30 August 2016 the European Court of Human Rights declared the application as inadmissible for being manifestly ill-founded, concluding that "it cannot be said that the domestic authorities have failed to discharge the procedural obligation under Article 2 of the Convention to conduct an effective investigation ... which was capable of leading to the establishment of the facts, ... and of identifying and – if appropriate – punishing those responsible".

=== Serbian prosecutions ===
On 11 August 2010, Humanitarian Law Center, a human rights non-governmental organization from the Republic of Serbia, filed a criminal complaint with the Office of the War Crimes Prosecutor of the Republic of Serbia against an unspecified number of members of the former Army of the Republika Srpska (VRS) for the alleged commitment of the war crime of genocide in Srebrenica, according to Article 14 of the Criminal Code of the Federal Republic of Yugoslavia (KZ SRJ) with regards to Article 22 of the KZ SRJ as co-perpetrators.

=== Swiss prosecutions ===
In May 2016 the first-instance court in Switzerland found the Swiss politician Donatello Poggi guilty for racial discrimination and had sentenced him to a two-year suspended prison sentence, for denial of genocide in Srebrenica in two opinion articles on the Corriere del Ticino and TicinoLibero websites. On 13 June 2017 the second-instance court rejected his appeal.

== Civil Suits ==
=== Bosnia and Herzegovina ===
In a case of Ferida Selimović et al. v. the Republika Srpska the Human Rights Chamber of Bosnia and Herzegovina decided on 49 applications comprising the "Srebrenica cases" which involved applications filed by immediate family members of Bosniak men presumed to have been killed as part of the mass executions during the Srebrenica genocide in July 1995. The cases raised issues under Articles 3, 8, and 13 of the European Convention on Human Rights, and of discrimination in connection with these rights under Article II(2)(b) of the Human Rights Agreement set out in Annex 6 to the General Framework Agreement for Peace in Bosnia and Herzegovina. The applicants alleged that they as close family members, either directly or indirectly, were themselves victims of alleged or apparent human rights violations resulting from the lack of specific information on the fate and whereabouts of their relatives last seen in Srebrenica in July 1995. They requested the authorities to bring the perpetrators to justice, and most also requested compensation for their suffering in an unspecified amount.

The Chamber relied on the Krstić trial judgment for the historical context and underlying facts, although it only utilized those factual portions of the Krstić judgment which were not included in the appeal that was underway at the time of the Chamber's decision. In its decision the Chamber concluded that Republika Srpska's failure to make accessible and to disclose information requested by the applicants about their missing relatives constituted a violation of its positive obligations to secure respect for their rights to private and family life, as guaranteed by Article 8 of the European Convention. Also, it held that Republika Srpska's failure to inform the applicants about the truth of the fate and whereabouts of their missing relatives, including conducting a meaningful and effective investigation into the massacre at Srebrenica in July 1995, violated their rights to be free from inhuman and degrading treatment, as guaranteed by Article 3 of the European Convention. Finally, the Chamber concluded that in failing to fulfill its obligations owed to the applicants under the European Convention, the Republika Srpska had discriminated against the applicants due to their Bosniak origin.

As for the reparations, the Chamber ordered Republika Srpska to disclose any information it had on the fate of the applicants relatives; to release any missing persons it had in custody; to conduct a full and meaningful investigation of the role of its authorities and armed forces in the Srebrenica massacre, its efforts to cover up the crime, and the fate of the missing persons, and to publish this report within six months of the decision; to publish the decision of the Chamber in the Serbian language in its Official Gazette; and to make a total donation of 4.000.000 Convertible Marks to the Srebrenica Genocide memorial. Following the decision the Srebrenica Commission was formed by the Republika Srpska government to investigate the events that occurred in and around Srebrenica in July 1995. It has been argued that even though the overall impact of the commission was limited, its formation and work did present a first step for Republika Srpska in recognition of the genocide.

=== United States ===
In 1994 two set of complaints (Doe v. Karadžić and Kadić v. Karadžić), both with multiple plaintiffs, filed suits under the Alien Tort Claims Act and the Torture Victims Protection Act in the United States District Court for the Southern District of New York, against Radovan Karadžić for various atrocities "carried out by Bosnian-Serb military forces as part of a genocidal campaign". The district court dismissed both cases claiming that named statutes required "state action", however the court of appeals revised and remanded that judgment, stating that "Karadžić may be found liable for genocide, war crimes, and crimes against humanity in his private capacity and for other violations in his capacity as a state actor, and that he is not immune from service of process". Karadžić was personally served with summons and complaint in each action during his visits to U.N. in New York, and he actively participated through his lawyers in the proceedings (Ramsey Clark, as his attorney), until the Supreme Court of the United States denied his request to review the decision of the court of appeals. In 2000, the district court entered order of default in Kadić v. Karadžić, after which the case proceeded to a damages phase in which the jury returned a verdict of US$745 million (US$265 million in compensatory damages and US$480 million in punitive damages), which was then incorporated in the judgment of the court, in favour of fourteen plaintiffs. The court also issued a permanent injunction by which Karadžić and his subordinates were enjoined and restrained from committing or facilitating "any acts of 'ethnic cleansing' or genocide (...) or any other act committed in order to harm, destroy or exterminate any person on the basis of ethnicity, religion and/or nationality". In the same year, in Doe v. Karadžić, the court decided in favour of twenty-one plaintiffs, and awarded them US$407 million in compensatory damages and US$3.8 billion in punitive damages. As of 2008 the plaintiffs did not receive damages. Deputy High representative for Bosnia and Herzegovina, Raffi Gregorian, stated that OHR was considering ways of confiscating Karadžić's property, including that of his closest relatives and network of his supporters, and that EUFOR had taken measurements of his family house in Pale.

=== The Netherlands ===
Currently two cases are being conducted before The Hague District Court in the Netherlands against the State of the Netherlands and the United Nations.

One case is headed by a team of 14 attorneys of Dutch law firm Van Diepen Van der Kroef, which is representing 11 plaintiffs including the foundation "Mothers of the Enclaves of Srebrenica and Žepa" (which represents 6,000 relatives of the victims), who asked the court, inter alia, to grant a judicial declaration that the UN and the State of the Netherlands breached their obligation to prevent genocide, as laid down in Genocide Convention and to hold them jointly liable to pay compensation for the loss and injury suffered by plaintiffs as well as damages yet to be determined by the court, and to settle these according to law. On 10 July 2008, the court ruled that it had no jurisdiction against the UN, however the proceedings against the State of the Netherlands continued. Plaintiffs have appealed the judgment (in relation to UN immunity), and first public hearings relating to this issue were held on 28 January 2010. The decision by the Court was made on 30 March 2010, by which the UN's absolute immunity was upheld. Plaintiffs have appealed this judgment as well, but the Supreme court of the Netherlands held in April 2012 that the UN enjoyed the immunity. On 11 June 2013 the European Court of Human Rights unanimously declared the application inadmissible, in relation to the alleged violation of Article 6 of the European Convention of Human Rights because of the granting of absolute immunity to the UN by the Dutch Supreme Court. On 16 July 2014 the District Court in The Hague ruled that the Netherlands is liable for the deaths of some 300 victims who were under Dutchbat's effective control, and which were forced out of the Dutchbat compound in Potočari, but not for the deaths of other victims. On 27 June 2017 the Hague Court of Appeals upheld the first-instance judgment against the Netherlands, but limited the Dutch government's liability to 30 percent of the damages.

The second case concerns a former UN interpreter, Hasan Nuhanović, and the family of Rizo Mustafić, an electrician who worked for the UN Battalion at Srebrenica. Nuhanović filed a suit against the State of the Netherlands in front of the District Court in The Hague claiming that Dutch troops within the UN peacekeeping contingent that were responsible for security in the then Srebrenica protected zone, allowed VRS troops to kill his family (brother, father and mother), while the family of Mustafić filed the suite because he was killed in similar circumstances. The liability of the state of the Netherlands was based on the opinion that the Dutch Government (Minister of Defense) had the de facto operational command of the battalion, as established by the Dutch Constitution (Article 97(2)), which grants the government superior command ("oppergezag") over Dutch military forces. On 10 September 2008, the Hague District Court ruled against the plaintiffs, noting that the state of the Netherlands cannot be held responsible for the acts or omissions of Dutchbat, since that contingent of troops was made available to the UN and, as a matter or principle, any of its acts are to be attributed strictly to the UN. At the same time it found that the acts of Dutchbat cannot be concurrently attributed to the Netherlands since, in the view of the Court, no evidence was presented that the Dutch government "cut across the United Nations command structure" by ordering the contingent to ignore or disobey UNPROFOR orders. On 5 July 2011, upon the appeal of the plaintiffs, the Dutch Appellate court held that the Netherlands was responsible for the three deaths indicated in the claim, and that it owns damages to the plaintiffs. On 3 May 2013, the Procurator General of the Supreme Court of the Netherlands concluded in his so-called "advisory opinion" that the appeal against the Judgment of the Court of Appeal of the Hague should be rejected. On 6 September 2009 the Supreme Court of the Netherlands upheld the Appeals Court decision holding the Netherlands liable for the three deaths in this case. The Netherlands decided to award the families of the victims with 20.000 EUR each of non-material damages, while the material damages will be determined at a later date.
