= Bosnian genocide =

1995 genocide in Bosnia and Herzegovina

- Part of the ethnic cleansing in the Bosnian War
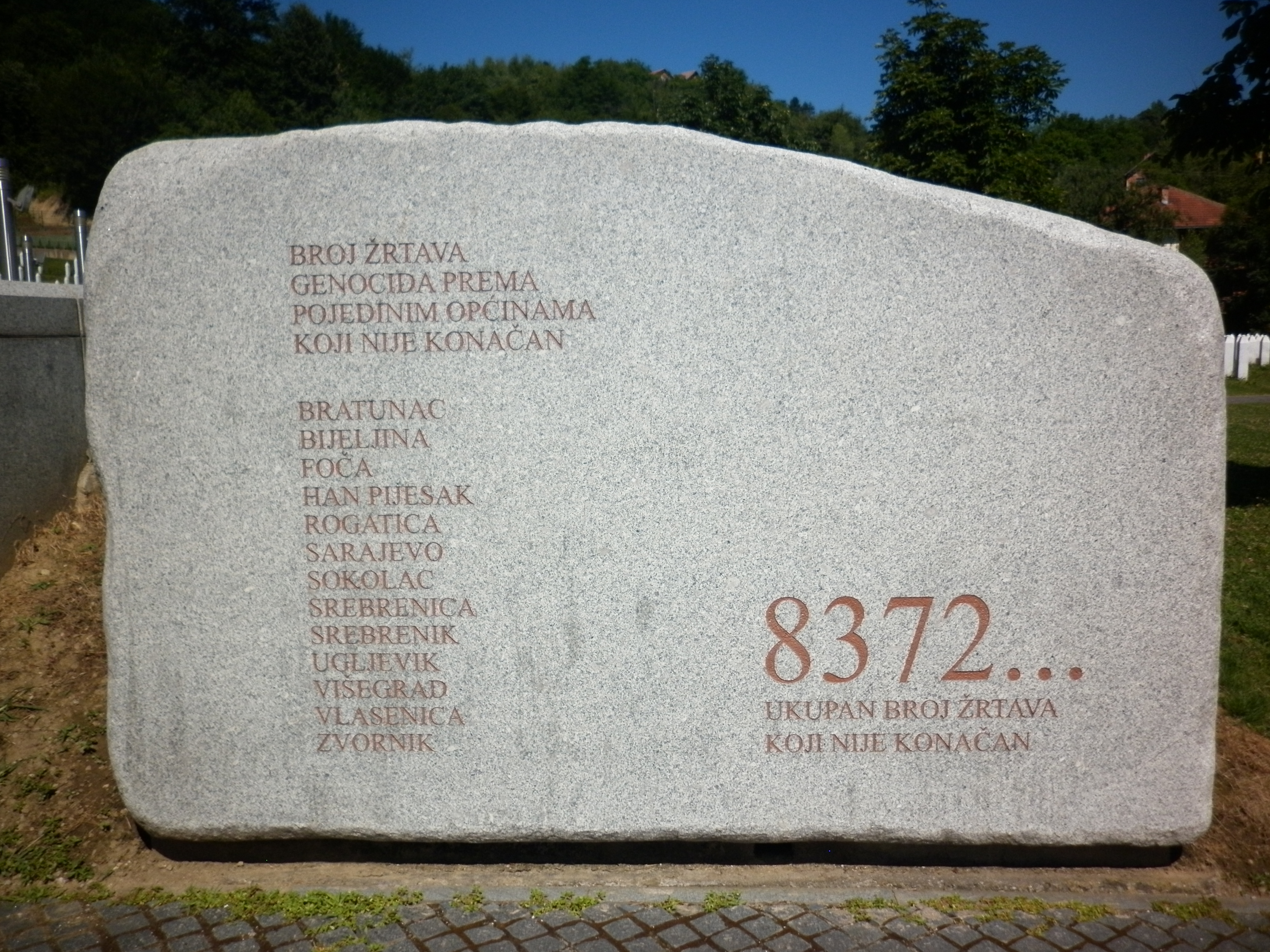
- Memorial stone at the Srebrenica-Potočari Memorial Centre
- Location: Bosnia and Herzegovina
- Date: 11–31 July 1995 (Srebrenica only)
- Target: Bosniak (Bosnian Muslim) men and prisoners of war (in Srebrenica); Bosniaks, Bosnian Croats and other non-Serbs across other areas of Bosnia and Herzegovina (wider definition of genocide)
- Attack type: Genocide, ethnic cleansing, mass murder, deportation, forced displacement, genocidal rape
- Deaths: Genocide: (Note: To date, only the massacre in Srebrenica has been described as a crime of genocide by the ICTY. Overall, 34000 Bosniak civilians were killed during the war and 1.2 million forcibly removed from a minimum of 64,036 Bosniak fatalities overall.): 8,372 killed (Srebrenica); 25,609–33,071 Bosniaks and Croats killed (wider definition of genocide)
- Victims: 25,000–30,000 expelled from Srebrenica; 30,000–50,000 women raped; 1,000,000 Bosniaks, Croats, and other non-Serbs expelled
- Perpetrators: Army of Republika Srpska (VRS); Scorpions, Arkan's Tigers and other paramilitary groups
- Motive: Greater Serbia; Ethnic nationalism; Ethnic separatism; Serbianisation; Islamophobia; Croatophobia; Catholophobia; Turkophobia

The Bosnian genocide (Note: Bosnian: Bosanski genocid) took place during the Bosnian War of 1992–1995 and includes the Srebrenica massacre of July 1995 or the wider crimes against humanity and ethnic cleansing campaign perpetrated throughout areas controlled by the Army of Republika Srpska (VRS). The events in Srebrenica in 1995 included the killing of more than 8,000 Bosniak (Bosnian Muslim) men and boys, as well as the mass expulsion of another 25,000–30,000 Bosniak civilians by VRS units under the command of General Ratko Mladić.

The ethnic cleansing that took place in VRS-controlled areas targeted Bosniaks and Bosnian Croats. The ethnic cleansing campaign included extermination, unlawful confinement, genocidal rape, sexual assault, torture, plunder and destruction of private and public property, and inhumane treatment of civilians; the targeting of political leaders, intellectuals, and professionals; the unlawful deportation and transfer of civilians; the unlawful shelling of civilians; the unlawful appropriation and plunder of real and personal property; the destruction of homes and businesses; and the destruction of places of worship. The acts have been found to have satisfied the requirements for "guilty acts" of genocide and that "some physical perpetrators held the intent to physically destroy the protected groups of Bosnian Muslims and Croats".

In the 1990s, several authorities asserted that ethnic cleansing as carried out by elements of the Bosnian Serb army was genocide; this remains the academic consensus, although Bosnian genocide denial remains. Later assertions included a resolution by the United Nations General Assembly and three convictions for genocide in German courts (based on a wider interpretation of genocide than that used by international courts). In 2005, the United States Congress passed a resolution declaring that the Serbian policies of aggression and ethnic cleansing meet the terms defining genocide.

The Srebrenica massacre was found to be an act of genocide by the International Criminal Tribunal for the Former Yugoslavia, a finding upheld by the ICJ. On 24 March 2016, former Bosnian Serb leader and the first president of the Republika Srpska, Radovan Karadžić, was found guilty of genocide in Srebrenica, war crimes, and crimes against humanity and sentenced to 40 years in prison. In 2019 an appeals court increased his sentence to life imprisonment. On 12 May 2021, it was announced that, in an agreement with UK authorities, he would serve the rest of his sentence in a UK prison.

== United Nations ==
External videos
- Everyday objects, tragic histories Ziyah Gafić, TED Talks, March 2014, 4:32

On 18 December 1992, the U.N. General Assembly resolution 47/121 in its preamble deemed ethnic cleansing to be a form of genocide stating:

Gravely concerned about the deterioration of the situation in the Republic of Bosnia and Herzegovina owing to intensified aggressive acts by the Serbian and Montenegrin forces to acquire more territories by force, characterized by a consistent pattern of gross and systematic violations of human rights, a burgeoning refugee population resulting from mass expulsions of defenceless civilians from their homes and the existence in Serbian and Montenegrin controlled areas of concentration camps and detention centres, in pursuit of the abhorrent policy of "ethnic cleansing", which is a form of genocide...

On 12 July 2007, in its judgement on the Jorgić v. Germany case, the European Court of Human Rights noted that:

the ICTY, in its judgments in the cases of Prosecutor v. Krstić and Prosecutor v. Kupreškić, expressly disagreed with the wide interpretation of the 'intent to destroy' as adopted by the UN General Assembly and the German courts. Referring to the principle of nullum crimen sine lege, the ICTY considered that genocide, as defined in public international law, comprised only acts aimed at the physical or biological destruction of a protected group.

== International Criminal Tribunal for the Former Yugoslavia ==
=== Finding of genocide at Srebrenica ===
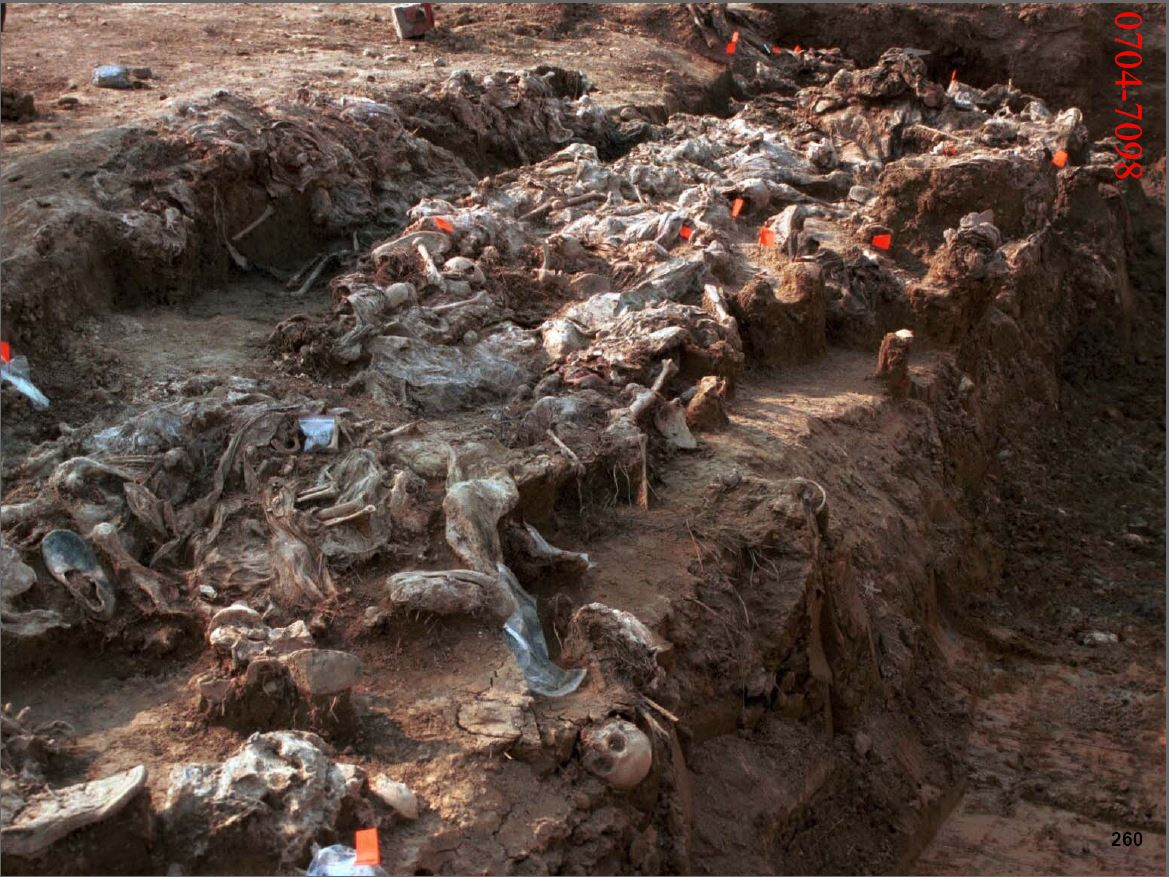
Exhumation of the Srebrenica massacre victims

In 2001, the International Criminal Tribunal for the Former Yugoslavia (ICTY) judged that the 1995 Srebrenica massacre was genocide. In the unanimous ruling Prosecutor v. Krstić, the Appeals Chamber of the International Criminal Tribunal for the former Yugoslavia (ICTY), located in The Hague, reaffirmed that the Srebrenica massacre was genocide, the Presiding Judge Theodor Meron stating:

By seeking to eliminate a part of the Bosnian Muslims, the Bosnian Serb forces committed genocide. They targeted for extinction the forty thousand Bosnian Muslims living in Srebrenica, a group which was emblematic of the Bosnian Muslims in general. They stripped all the male Muslim prisoners, military and civilian, elderly and young, of their personal belongings and identification, and deliberately and methodically killed them solely on the basis of their identity.

In September 2006, former Bosnian Serb leader Momcilo Krajišnik was found guilty of multiple instances of crimes against humanity, but while the ICTY judges found that there was evidence that crimes committed in Bosnia constituted the criminal act of genocide (actus reus), they did not establish that the accused possessed genocidal intent, or was part of a criminal enterprise that had such an intent (mens rea).

In 2007, the court found insufficient evidence to conclude on alleged genocidal intent.

The Court is however not convinced, on the basis of the evidence before it, that it has been conclusively established that the massive killings of members of the protected group were committed with the specific intent (dolus specialis) on the part of the perpetrators to destroy, in whole or in part, the group as such. The killings outlined above may amount to war crimes and crimes against humanity, but the Court has no jurisdiction to determine whether this is so.

=== Finding of genocide at Žepa ===
In the case of Tolimir, in the first degree verdict, the International Criminal Tribunal concluded that genocide was committed in the enclave of Žepa, outside of Srebrenica. However, that conviction was overturned by the appeals chamber, which narrowed the crime of genocide only to Srebrenica.

=== Milošević trial ===
On 16 June 2004, in Prosecutor v. Slobodan Milošević: Decision on Motion for Judgement of Acquittal, the ICTY Trial Chamber refused to acquit former Serbian president Slobodan Milošević on the same grounds, and ruled:

246. On the basis of the inference that may be drawn from this evidence, a Trial Chamber could be satisfied beyond reasonable doubt that there existed a joint criminal enterprise, which included members of the Bosnian Serb leadership, whose aim and intention was to destroy a part of the Bosnian Muslim population, and that genocide was in fact committed in Brčko, Prijedor, Sanski Most, Srebrenica, Bijeljina, Ključ and Bosanski Novi. The genocidal intent of the Bosnian Serb leadership can be inferred from all the evidence, including the evidence set out in paragraphs 238–245. The scale and pattern of the attacks, their intensity, the substantial number of Muslims killed in the seven municipalities, the detention of Muslims, their brutal treatment in detention centres and elsewhere, and the targeting of persons essential to the survival of the Muslims as a group are all factors that point to genocide.

On 26 February 2007, however, in the Bosnian genocide case, the United Nations International Court of Justice (ICJ) found that there was no evidence linking Serbia under the rule of Milošević to genocide committed by Bosnian Serbs in the Bosnian War. However, the court did find that Milošević and others in Serbia did not do enough to prevent acts of genocide from occurring in Srebrenica.

On 22 November 2017, an International court in The Hague found General Ratko Mladić guilty of one count of genocide, five counts of crimes against humanity and four counts of violations of the laws or customs of war. He was found not guilty of one count of genocide and sentenced to life imprisonment.

=== Involvement of Serbia ===
In Bosnia and Herzegovina v Serbia and Montenegro, the International Court of Justice concluded that Serbia was not responsible for the events in Srebrenica, although it did conclude that Serbia had failed in its duty to prevent the massacre.

On 28 February 2013, the ICTY Court of Appeals overturned a conviction for JNA (Yugoslav National Army) Chief of Staff Momčilo Perišić for crimes committed in Bosnia and Herzegovina and Croatia and ordered Perišić's immediate release. His acquittal means that, to date, no official or army officer of Serbia-Montenegro (Yugoslavia) and no member of the JNA or VJ high command has ever been convicted by the ICTY for war-crimes committed in Bosnia.

On 30 May 2013, the ICTY acquitted and ordered the immediate release of Jovica Stanišić and Franko Simatović, two close aides of Slobodan Milošević. Stanišić was the Chief of the Serbian State Security Service, while Simatović was in charge of the special operations arm of the State Security Service.

== United States House and Senate resolutions ==
The month before the 10th anniversary of the Srebrenica Massacre, both houses of the United States Congress passed similarly worded resolutions asserting that the policies of aggression and ethnic cleansing as implemented by Serb forces in Bosnia and Herzegovina from 1992 to 1995, including the Srebrenica Massacre, constituted genocide.

On 27 June 2005, during the 109th Congress, the United States House of Representatives passed a resolution (H. Res. 199 sponsored by Congressman Christopher Smith with 39 cosponsors) commemorating the 10th anniversary of the Srebrenica genocide. The resolution, as amended, was passed with an overwhelming majority of 370 – YES votes, 1 – NO vote, and 62 – ABSENT. The resolution is a bipartisan measure commemorating 11 July 1995 – 2005, the tenth anniversary of the Srebrenica massacre. The Senate version, S.Res.134, was sponsored by Senator Gordon Smith with 8 cosponsors and was agreed to in the Senate on 22 June 2005 without amendment and with unanimous consent. The summaries of the resolutions are identical, with the exception of the name of the house passing the resolution, and the substitution of the word executed for murdered by the House in the first clause:

Expresses the sense of the [House of Representatives]/[Senate] that:

(1) the thousands of innocent people executed at Srebrenica in Bosnia and Herzegovina in July 1995, along with all individuals who were victimized during the conflict and genocide in Bosnia and Herzegovina from 1992 to 1995, should be remembered and honored;
(2) the Serbian policies of aggression and ethnic cleansing meet the terms defining genocide;
(3) foreign nationals, including U.S. citizens, who have risked, and in some cases lost, their lives in Bosnia and Herzegovina should be remembered and honored;
(4) the United Nations (U.N.) and its member states should accept their share of responsibility for allowing the Srebrenica massacre and genocide to occur, and seek to ensure that this does not happen in future crises;
(5) it is in the U.S. national interest that the responsible individuals should be held accountable for their actions;
(6) persons indicted by the International Criminal Tribunal for the former Yugoslavia (ICTY) should be apprehended and transferred to The Hague without further delay, and countries should meet their obligations to cooperate with the ICTY; and
(7) the United States should support the independence and territorial integrity of Bosnia and Herzegovina and peace and stability in southeastern Europe.

— CRS Summary.

== International Court of Justice (ICJ): Bosnia and Herzegovina v. Serbia and Montenegro ==
A trial took place before the International Court of Justice (ICJ), following a 1993 suit by Bosnia and Herzegovina against Serbia and Montenegro alleging genocide. On 26 February 2007, the ICJ, in the Bosnian Genocide Case concurred with the ICTY's earlier finding that the Srebrenica massacre constituted genocide.

ICJ President Rosalyn Higgins noted that there was much evidence to prove that crimes against humanity and war crimes had been committed in Bosnia and Herzegovina such as widespread killings, the siege of towns, mass rapes, torture, deportation to camps and detention centres, but the ICJ did not have jurisdiction over them, because the case dealt "exclusively with genocide in a limited legal sense and not in the broader sense sometimes given to this term". Moreover, the Court found "that Serbia has not committed genocide" nor "conspired to" or "incited the commission of genocide". It did however, find that Serbia had failed "to take all measures within its power to prevent genocide in Srebrenica" and to comply fully with the ICTY by failing to transfer Ratko Mladić to the custody of the ICTY in the Hague and that Serbia must in future transfer to the Hague all ICTY-indicted individuals, who reside under Serbian jurisdiction.

=== Criticism of the ICJ judgement ===
The Court's finding that Serbia was not directly involved in the Srebrenica genocide have been strongly criticized. Prof. Yuval Shany, Hersch Lauterpacht Professor of Public International Law at the Hebrew University of Jerusalem, described the Court's conclusions on the three questions before it as controversial:

First, as far as the jurisdictional part of the decision goes, the court has been severely criticized for unjustifiably over-stretching the concept of res judicata to decisions on jurisdiction rendered at an earlier stage of the same proceedings; for over-relying on legal conclusions that were decided at earlier stages without serious consideration; and for narrowly construing its powers of revision. Indeed, seven out of the fifteen judges on the bench expressed varying degrees of unease with this particular outcome.

Second, as for the actual findings on the commission of genocide, some writers have criticized the court for refusing to look at the 'bigger picture' of the events in Bosnia – a picture that seems to suggest that the various atrocious crimes meted out by the Bosnian Serbs were all part of the same 'master-plan' of creating an ethnically homogeneous Serbian state. Others have questioned the court's readiness to rely on the absence of individual convictions in genocide by the ICTY (except with relation to the massacre in Srebrenica), without properly considering the difference between standards of liability under criminal law and state responsibility or fully appreciating the limited probative value of reduced charges as the result of plea bargains.

Third, with respect to the question of Serbian responsibility, the court's legal analysis of attribution standards, the reluctance to find Serbia to be an accomplice to genocide, and the decision to refrain from ordering reparations, have all been criticized as excessively conservative. At the same time, the court's expansive reading of Article 1 of the Genocide Convention as potentially imposing on all states a duty to prevent genocide, even if committed outside their territory, has been noted for its remarkable boldness. Still, some writers have criticized the court for not clarifying whether Article 1 can provide an independent basis for exercising of universal jurisdiction against individual perpetrators of genocide. So, arguably, the court construed broadly the duty to prevent genocide while narrowly construing the duty to punish its perpetrators.

Antonio Cassese, the first president of the International Criminal Tribunal for the former Yugoslavia, criticized the ICJ judgement on the ground that "The International Court has set an unrealistically high standard of proof for finding Serbia complicit in genocide." He further added that the fact that according to the court, Serbia was aware of the very high risk of acts of genocide and did nothing, yet it was not complicit because "it has not been proven" that the acts of genocide at Srebrenica "had been brought to Belgrade's attention", was a puzzling statement.

The vice-president of the International Court of Justice, Judge Al-Khasawneh, criticized the judgement as not reflecting the evidence with respect to Serbia's direct responsibility for genocide at Srebrenica:

The 'effective control' test for attribution established in the Nicaragua case is not suitable to questions of State responsibility for international crimes committed with a common purpose. The 'overall control' test for attribution established in the Tadić case is more appropriate when the commission of international crimes is the common objective of the controlling State and the non-State actors. The Court's refusal to infer genocidal intent from a consistent pattern of conduct in Bosnia and Herzegovina is inconsistent with the established jurisprudence of the ICTY. The FRY's knowledge of the genocide set to unfold in Srebrenica is clearly established. The Court should have treated the Scorpions as a de jure organ of the FRY. The statement by the Serbian Council of Ministers in response to the massacre of Muslim men by the Scorpions amounted to an admission of responsibility. The Court failed to appreciate the definitional complexity of the crime of genocide and to assess the facts before it accordingly.

== European Court of Human Rights ==
The Higher Regional Court of Düsseldorf, Germany, in September 1997, handed down a genocide conviction against Nikola Jorgić, a Bosnian Serb who was the leader of a paramilitary group located in the Doboj region. He was sentenced to four terms of life imprisonment for his involvement in genocidal actions that took place in regions of Bosnia and Herzegovina, other than Srebrenica.

In a judgement issued on 12 July 2007, the European Court of Human Rights (ECHR) in the Jorgić v. Germany case (Application no. 74613/01), reviewed the German court's judgements against Jorgić. In rejecting Jorgić's appeal, the ECHR affirmed that the German court's ruling was consistent with an interpretation of the Genocide Convention foreseeable at the time Jorgić committed the offence in 1992. However, the ECHR highlighted that the German court's ruling, based upon German domestic law, had interpreted the crime of genocide more broadly than and in a manner since rejected by international courts. Under the wider definition that the German judiciary upheld, the ethnic cleansing carried out by Jorgić was a genocide because it was an intent to destroy the group as a social unit, and although the majority of scholars took the view that German genocide law should interpret genocide as the physical-biological destruction of the protected group, "a considerable number of scholars were of the opinion that the notion of destruction of a group as such, in its literal meaning, was wider than a physical-biological extermination and also encompassed the destruction of a group as a social unit".

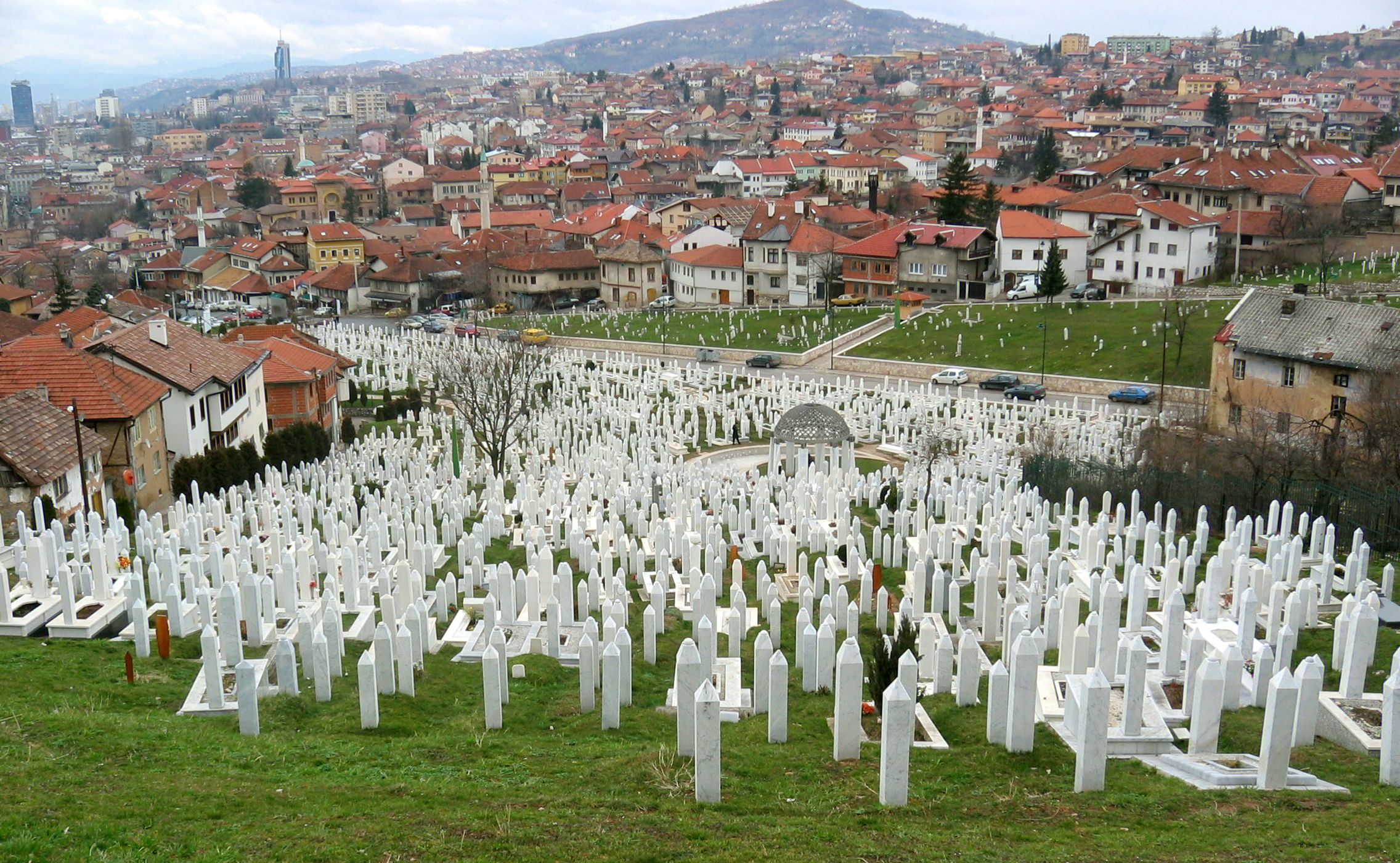
The Martyrs' Memorial Cemetery Kovači for victims of the war in Stari Grad.

In the case of Prosecutor v. Krstić (2 August 2001), the ICTY ruled "customary international law limits the definition of genocide to those acts seeking the physical or biological destruction of all or part of the group. Hence, an enterprise attacking only the cultural or sociological characteristics of a human group in order to annihilate these elements which give to that group its own identity distinct from the rest of the community would not fall under the definition of genocide". On 19 April 2004, this determination was upheld on appeal: "The Genocide Convention, and customary international law in general, prohibit only the physical or biological destruction of a human group. ... The Trial Chamber expressly acknowledged this limitation, and eschewed any broader definition. ... " although like the lower court, the appeal court also ruled that ethnic cleansing might with other evidence lead to an inference of genocidal intent. On 14 January 2000, the ICTY ruled in the Prosecutor v. Kupreškić and Others case that the Lašva Valley ethnic cleansing campaign in order to expel the Bosnian Muslim population from the region was persecution, not genocide per se. The ECHR noted the opinion of the International Court of Justice ruling in the Bosnian Genocide Case that ethnic cleansing is not in and of itself genocide.

In reference to legal writers, the ECHR also noted: "Amongst scholars, the majority have taken the view that ethnic cleansing, in the way in which it was carried out by the Serb forces in Bosnia and Herzegovina in order to expel Muslims and Croats from their homes, did not constitute genocide. However, there are also a considerable number of scholars who have suggested that these acts did amount to genocide".

The ECHR having reviewed the case and the more recent international rulings on the issue the ECHR ruled that "The Court finds that the [German] courts' interpretation of 'intent to destroy a group' as not necessitating a physical destruction of the group, which has also been adopted by a number of scholars ... , is therefore covered by the wording, read in its context, of the crime of genocide in the [German] Criminal Code and does not appear unreasonable", so "In view of the foregoing, the [ECHR] concludes that, while many authorities had favoured a narrow interpretation of the crime of genocide, there had already been several authorities at the material time which had construed the offence of genocide in the same wider way as the German courts. In these circumstances, the [ECHR] finds that [Jorgić], if need be with the assistance of a lawyer, could reasonably have foreseen that he risked being charged with and convicted of genocide for the acts he had committed in 1992.", and for this reason the court rejected Jorgić's assertion that there had been a breach of Article 7 (no punishment without law) of the European Convention on Human Rights by Germany.

== European Parliament ==
In October 2008, representatives of the non-governmental organization Mothers of the Enclaves of Srebrenica and Žepa visited the European Parliament (EP) and handed over a resolution proposal for establishing a European genocide remembrance day on 11 July to the EP vice-president Diana Wallis and the Slovenian Member of the European Parliament Jelko Kacin, both members of the Alliance of Liberals and Democrats for Europe (ALDE) group. Wallis and Kacin then presented a joint motion in the parliament.

As a result of this initiative, on 15 January 2009, the European Parliament passed a resolution calling on the European Union's executive authorities to commemorate 11 July as a day of remembrance and mourning of the 1995 Srebrenica genocide, explicitly recognized as such with reference to the ICJ decision. A compromise wording was found that commemorated all the victims of atrocities committed during the Yugoslav Wars while insisting on the special status of the Srebrenica massacre. The resolution also reiterated a number of findings including the number of victims as "more than 8000 Muslim men and boys" executed and "nearly 25000 women, children and elderly people were forcibly deported, making this event the biggest war crime to take place in Europe since the end of the Second World War". The resolution passed overwhelmingly, on a vote of 556 to 9.

== Individuals prosecuted for genocide during the Bosnian War ==
Here is the village of Plane, it used to be Turkish. Now we will go towards it. You film this freely, you know. Let our Serbs see what we have done to them... If the Americans and English, the Ukrainians and Canadians in Srebrenica, in the meantime it's the Dutch, would not protect them, they would have disappeared from this area long ago.
— Ratko Mladić, 15 August 1994

About 30 people have been indicted for participating in genocide or complicity in genocide during the early 1990s in Bosnia. To date, after several plea bargains and some convictions that were successfully challenged on appeal, two men, Vujadin Popović and Ljubiša Beara, have been found guilty of genocide, and two others, Radislav Krstić and Drago Nikolić, have been found guilty of aiding and abetting genocide, by an international court for their participation in the Srebrenica massacre.

Four have been found guilty of participating in genocides in Bosnia by German courts, one of whom, Nikola Jorgić, lost an appeal against his conviction in the European Court of Human Rights.

On 29 July 2008, the State Court of Bosnia and Herzegovina found Milenko Trifunović, Brano Džinić, Aleksandar Radovanović, Miloš Stupar, Branislav Medan and Petar Mitrović guilty of genocide for their part in the Srebrenica massacre, and on 16 October 2009 the State Court of Bosnia and Herzegovina found Milorad Trbić, a former member of the Bosnian Serb security forces, guilty of genocide for his participation in the genocide in the Srebrenica massacre.

Slobodan Milošević, the former President of Serbia and of Yugoslavia, was the most senior political figure to stand trial at the ICTY. He was charged with having committed genocide, either alone or in concert with other named members of a joint criminal enterprise. The indictment accused him of planning, preparing and executing the destruction, in whole or in part, of the Bosnian Muslim national, ethnical, racial or religious groups, as such, in territories within Bosnia and Herzegovina including Bijeljina, Bosanski Novi, Brčko, Ključ, Kotor Varoš, Prijedor, Sanski Most and Srebrenica. He died during his trial, on 11 March 2006, and no verdict was returned.

The ICTY had issued a warrant for the arrest of Radovan Karadžić and Ratko Mladić on several charges including genocide. Karadžić was arrested in Belgrade on 21 July 2008, and was transferred into ICTY custody in the Hague nine days later on 30 July. Ratko Mladić was also arrested in Serbia on 26 May 2011 after a decade in hiding.

On 24 March 2016, Karadžić was sentenced to 40 years in prison. Finally, on 22 November 2017, Mladić was sentenced to a life in prison. Both were sentenced for war crimes, crimes against humanity and genocide. Both Karadžić and Mladić appealed their convictions. In 2019 appeals judges increased Karadžić's sentence to life in prison. A verdict in Mladić's appeal was expected in June 2021. It was rejected on 8 June with Mladic's sentence affirmed by a panel of U.N. judges in a four to one vote.

== Death toll ==
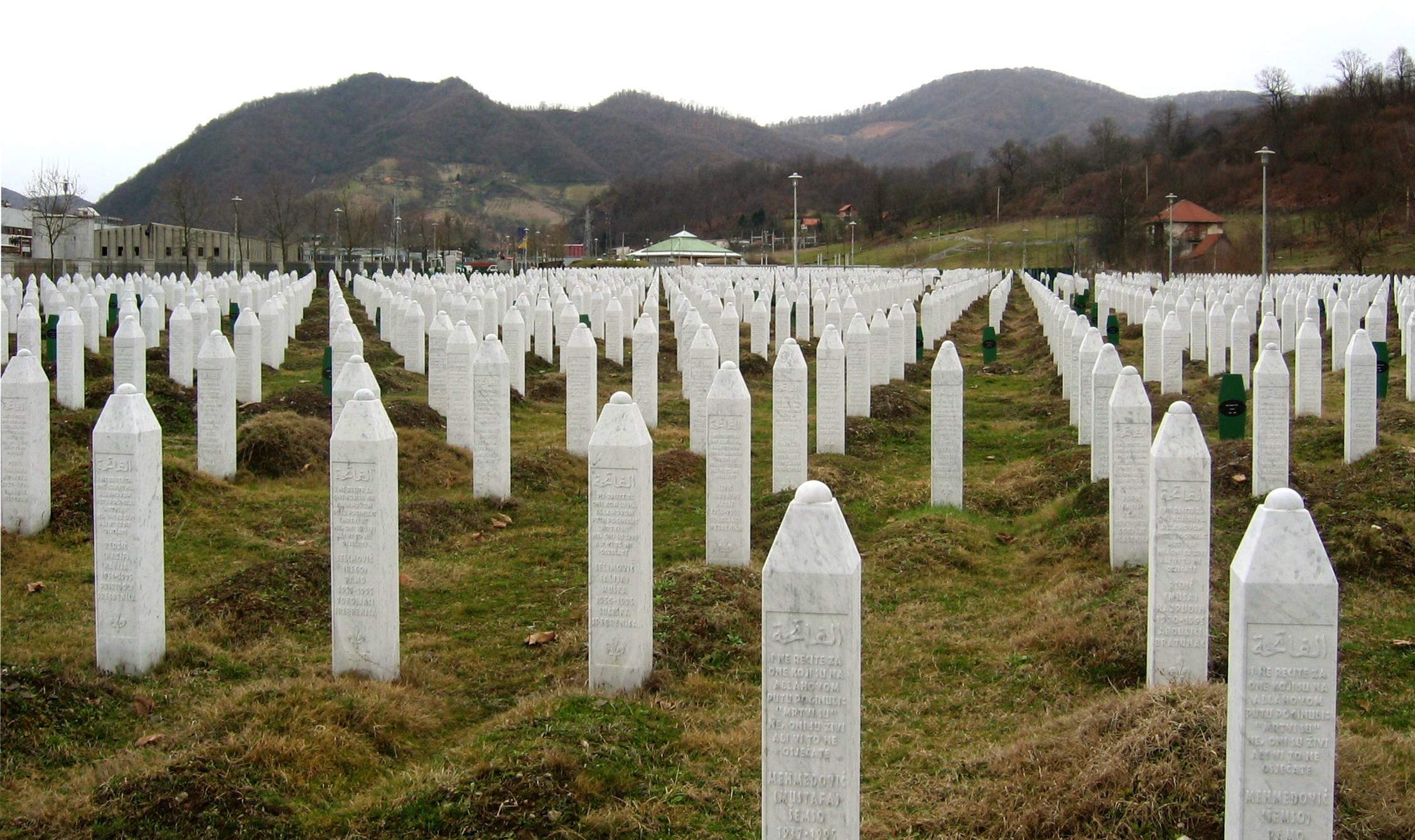
The Srebrenica Genocide Memorial in Potočari

If a narrow definition of genocide is used, as favoured by the international courts, then during the Srebrenica massacre, 8000 Bosnian Muslim men and boys were murdered and the remainder of the population (between 25000 and 30000 Bosniak women, children and elderly people) was forced to leave the area. If a wider definition is used, then the number is much larger. According to the ICTY Demographic Unit, an estimated 69.8% or 25,609 of the civilians killed in the war were Bosniak (with 42,501 military deaths), with the Bosnian Serbs suffering 7,480 civilian casualties (15,299 military deaths), the Bosnian Croats suffering 1,675 civilian casualties (7,183 military deaths), amounting to a total of 104,732 casualties, spread between the Bosnian Croats (8.5%), Bosnian Serbs (21.7%), Bosniaks (65%), and others (4.8%).

In January 2013, the Sarajevo-based Research and Documentation Center (RDC) published its final results on "the most comprehensive" research into Bosnia-Herzegovina's war casualties: The Bosnian Book of the Dead – a database that reveals "a minimum of" 97,207 names of Bosnia and Herzegovina's citizens killed and missing during the 1992–1995 war. The head of the ICTY Demographic Unit, Ewa Tabeu, has called it "the largest existing database on Bosnian war victims". More than 240000 pieces of data were collected, processed, checked, compared and evaluated by an international team of experts to tabulate the names of the victims. According to the RDC, 82% or 33,071 of the civilians killed in the war were Bosniak, with a minimum of 97,207 casualties, military and civilian, for all sides involved: Bosniaks (66.2%), Serbs (25.4%) and Croats (7.8%), as well as others (0.5%).

In addition to those known to be outright killed, around 10,500 people are still missing with unknown fates due to the Bosnian War; most of them are Bosniaks.

== Controversy and denial ==
While the majority of international opinion accepts the findings of the international courts, there remains some disagreement about the extent of the genocide and to what degree Serbia was involved.

The Bosnian Muslim community asserts that the Srebrenica massacre was just one instance of what was a broader genocide committed by Serbia.

The International Court of Justice veered away from the factual and legal findings of the ICTY Appeals Chamber in the Duško Tadić case. In the judgment delivered in July 1999, the Appeals Chamber found that the Army of Republika Srpska was "under overall control" of Belgrade and the Yugoslav Army, which meant that they had funded, equipped and assisted in the coordination and the planning of military operations. Had the International Court of Justice accepted this finding of the Tribunal, Serbia would have been found guilty of complicity in the Srebrenica genocide. Instead it concluded that the Appeals Chamber in the Tadic case "did not attempt to determine the responsibility of a state but individual criminal responsibility". Paradoxical as it may be, the outcome of this legal suit filed back in March 1993 arrived too early for Bosnia and Herzegovina. Radovan Karadžić arrest came over a year after the ICJ gave its judgement, and Ratko Mladić, also accused of genocide, was arrested in May 2011. Slobodan Milošević died during his trial and three trials of former Serb officials have just started.

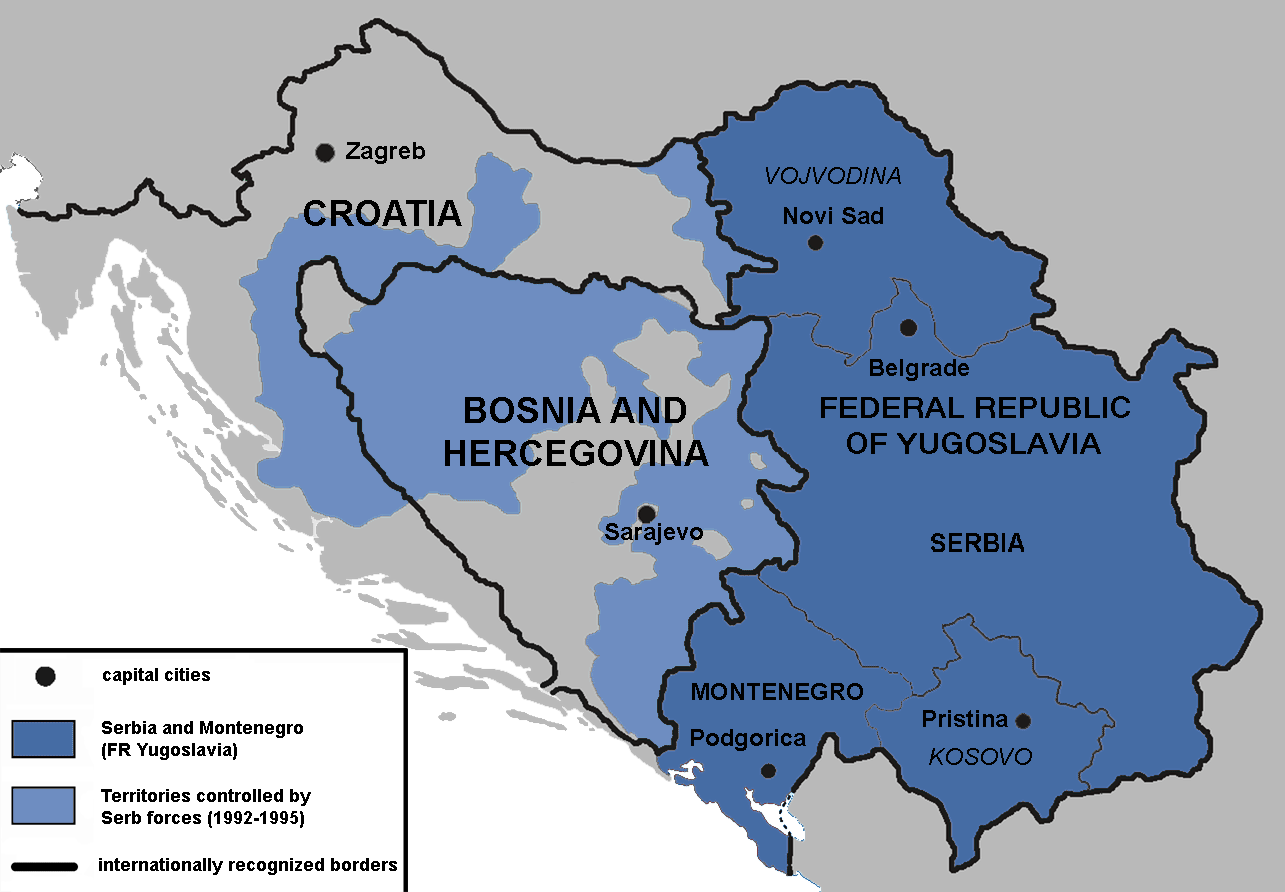
Territories of the Republic of Bosnia and Herzegovina and the Republic of Croatia controlled by Serb forces 1992–1995. The War Crimes Tribual accused Milošević and other Serb leaders of "attempting to create a Greater Serbia, a Serbian state encompassing the Serb-populated areas of Croatia and Bosnia, and achieved by forcibly removing non-Serbs from large geographical areas through the commission of crimes."

Although the ICTY prosecutors had access to them during the trials, some of the minutes of wartime meetings of Yugoslavia's political and military leaders, were not made public as the ICTY accepted the Serbian argument that to do so would damage Serbia's national security. Although the ICJ could have subpoenaed the documents directly from Serbia, it did not do so and relied instead on those made public during the ICTY trials. Two of the ICJ judges criticised this decision in strongly worded dissents. Marlise Simons reporting on this in The New York Times, states that "When the documents were handed over [to the ICTY], the lawyers said, a team from Belgrade made it clear in letters to the tribunal and in meetings with prosecutors and judges that it wanted the documents expurgated to keep them from harming Serbia's case at the International Court of Justice. The Serbs made no secret of that even as they argued their case for 'national security,' said one of the lawyers, adding, 'The senior people here [at the ICTY] knew about this'.". Simons continues that Rosalyn Higgins the president of the ICJ, declined to comment when asked why the full records had not been subpoenaed, saying that "The ruling speaks for itself". Diane Orentlicher, a law professor at American University in Washington, commented "Why didn't the court request the full documents? The fact that they were blacked out clearly implies these passages would have made a difference.", and William Schabas, a professor of international law at the University of Ireland in Galway, suggested that as a civil rather than a criminal court, the ICJ was more used to relying on materials put before it than aggressively pursuing evidence which might lead to a diplomatic incident.

=== Denial ===
Several prolific writers and academics, including Noam Chomsky and Edward S. Herman, have argued that the Srebrenica massacre does not constitute genocide. Such advocates often cite that women and children were largely spared and that only military age men were targeted. This view is not supported by the findings of the ICJ nor the ICTY.

According to the Radislav Krstić appellate judgment:

“The decision not to kill the women or children may be explained by the Bosnian Serbs’ sensitivity to public opinion. In contrast to the killing of the captured military men, such an action could not easily be kept secret, or disguised as a military operation, and so carried an increased risk of attracting international censure… The international attention focused on Srebrenica, combined with the presence of UN troops in the area, prevented those members of the VRS Main Staff who devised the genocidal plan from putting it into action in the most direct and efficient way. Constrained by the circumstances, they adopted the method which would allow them to implement the genocidal design while minimizing the risk of retribution.”

The final list of those killed in the Srebrenica genocide includes 694 children.

According to Sonja Biserko, president of the Helsinki Committee for Human Rights in Serbia, and Edina Bećirević, the faculty of criminology and security studies of the University of Sarajevo:

Denial of the Srebrenica genocide takes many forms in Serbia. The methods range from the brutal to the deceitful. Denial is present most strongly in political discourse, in the media, in the sphere of law, and in the educational system.

== See also ==
- Outline of genocide studies
- Srebrenica massacre
- Bosniaks
- Command responsibility
- Genocides in history
- Republika Srpska
- Serbian war crimes in the Yugoslav Wars
- Doboj massacre
- Bijeljina massacre
- Sarajevo Safari
