= Borislav Herak =

Bosnian Serb soldier (born 1971)

- Born: 18 January 1971 (age 55); Sarajevo, SR Bosnia and Herzegovina, SFR Yugoslavia
- Allegiance: Republika Srpska
- Rank: Soldier

Borislav Herak (Serbian Cyrillic: Борислав Херак; born 18 January 1971) is a Bosnian Serb former soldier who fought with the Army of Republika Srpska (VRS) in the early days of the Bosnian War. In March 1993, after falling in the hands of the Army of the Republic of Bosnia and Herzegovina (ARBiH), he was put on trial at the Sarajevo Military District Court, becoming the first person to be convicted of genocide on the basis of his own testimony in which he admitted guilt for crimes charged against him—32 murders and 16 rapes.

Herak's confessions were the subject of a Pulitzer Prize-winning article by John F. Burns.

== Crimes and trial ==
On 7 February 1993 the District Military Prosecutor's Office in Sarajevo filed an indictment with the District Military Court in Sarajevo against Herak for genocide, war crimes against a civilian population and war crimes against prisoners of war, committed while he was a member of "Bioča Company" and "Kremeš Company". Borislav Herak was charged with 32 murders and 16 rapes, including 12 in which the victims were murdered. Sretko Damjanović, indicted with him for genocide and war crimes against a civilian population, was charged with five murders and two rapes, and Nada Tomić was charged with concealment of crime for hiding fugitives (Herak and Damjanović) and stolen goods.

The trial of Damjanović and Herak in March 1993 was the first attempt by the Sarajevo legal system to try Bosnian Serbs for genocide and other war crimes. During his trial Herak said he was sent with some soldiers from Serbia to the village of Ahatovići, near Sarajevo, with orders "to kill everybody and burn everything down." About 150 villagers, including children, were herded together and machine-gunned before being dumped, some still alive, in a mass grave. Herak also confessed to rapes and murders of detainees at the Cafe Sonya/Kod Sonje rape camp run by Miro Vuković near the United Nations headquarters in Sarajevo.

On 30 March 1993, by a judgment of the District Military Court, Herak and Damjanović were found guilty of all charges and sentenced to death. The two were sentenced to death by firing squad. Herak said that he deserved to be executed. There were no witnesses to the killings and no bodies were recovered. The two men were convicted largely on the basis of Herak's confession after Damjanović retracted his confession, claiming that he had been beaten and tortured into confessing.

In July 1993, the second instance court upheld the findings of guilt and the penalties imposed. The third-instance court hearing in December 1993 confirmed the judgment of the second-instance court. It was claimed that the trial was a showcase and the accused had not had a fair hearing. However, the court rejected the call for a retrial of Damjanović, saying that "there was plenty of other evidence sufficient for a verdict."

Herak recanted his testimony in January 1996, claiming that his testimony before the Bosnian court was beaten out of him. He maintained that he had witnessed killings and heard about rapes but had not done anything himself. In the meanwhile, two Muslim brothers, Kasim and Asim Blekić, whose supposed murders were used as evidence in the trial of Herak and Damjanović had been found living in a Sarajevo suburb.

In February 2000 the Human Rights Chamber for Bosnia and Herzegovina ordered a retrial of Sretko Damjanović, who was acquitted. Requests for Herak's retrial were rejected, leaving Herak the only person convicted of genocide by a local court before the establishment of the state Court of Bosnia and Herzegovina and the first person to be convicted of the crime of genocide since the Second World War. Herak's death sentence was reduced to 40 years imprisonment on 30 November 1998, then to 20 years imprisonment on 16 March 1999. He was released from prison in 2012.

=== Criticism ===
Defence lawyers claimed that the trial was conducted in undue haste, no physical evidence was produced and the judge's decision had been influenced by the heavily charged political atmosphere surrounding the trial, which was used by the Bosnian Government to publicise the brutal campaign of ethnic cleansing being carried out by the Bosnian Serbs. The trial was the first attempt by the Bosnian legal authorities to try Bosnian Serbs for genocide and other war crimes and seen as the first step in a judicial process aimed at bringing the Serbs responsible for mass killings of Bosniaks (Bosnian Muslims) to justice.

Following the revelation that two of the alleged murder victims Herak claimed to have seen Damjanović kill were still alive and that subsequent to the convictions the District Military Court had issued an investigation warrant identifying the three killers of a third, Ramiz Kršo, as Nenad Damjanović, Bozo Jeftić and Miro Vuković, concern was expressed that the Bosnian judicial system might be discredited as a result and charges against more senior figures might be jeopardised. The investigator, Šaban Maksumić, was criticised for his failure to obtain more convincing evidence and exposing the judicial system to the risk of scandal.

Bosnian journalists who referred to "unavoidable mistakes" due to the abnormal conditions in which the trial was conducted (the Court building in Sarajevo was targeted by Serb artillery fire during the trial), nevertheless criticised the potential threat to the credibility of basic evidence supplied by the Bosnian investigative agencies and legal authorities to the International Criminal Tribunal for the former Yugoslavia (ICTY) in The Hague.

Judge Fahrudin Teftedarija, who had tried and sentenced Herak and Damjanović, insisted in 1997 that the reappearance of the Blekić brothers and the indictment of other suspects for the murder of Ramiz Kršo did not challenge the degree of Damjanović's guilt—he had committed other murders, rapes and expulsions.

== Pulitzer Prize ==
John F. Burns was awarded the 1993 Pulitzer Prize for International Reporting, citing "his courageous and thorough coverage of the destruction of Sarajevo and the barbarous killings in the war in Bosnia-Herzegovina."
