= Nikola Jorgić =

Bosnian Serb soldier

- Born: 1946; Doboj, Bosnia and Herzegovina, Yugoslavia
- Died: 8 June 2014 (aged 67–68); Germany
- Status: Deceased
- Criminal charges: Aiding and abetting the crime of genocide and grave breaches of the Geneva Conventions
- Penalty: Life imprisonment

Nikola Jorgić (1946 – 8 June 2014) was a Bosnian Serb from the Doboj region who was a soldier of a paramilitary group located in his native area. On 26 September 1997, he was convicted of genocide in Germany. This was the first conviction won against participants in the Bosnian Genocide. Jorgić was sentenced to four terms of life imprisonment for his involvement in the Bosnian genocide.

== Background ==
The Oberlandesgericht found that the paramilitary group had joined in the Bosnian Serb government's activities. Jorgić, who had been a resident of Germany from May 1969 until 1992, was responsible for multiple crimes. Among his actions was the massacre in Grabska, where 22 villagers – including the elderly and disabled – were executed before the rest of the villagers were expelled. He was also deemed responsible for the death of seven villagers in Sevarlije. His appeal following his conviction was rejected by the Federal Court of Justice (the federal supreme court) on 30 April 1999. The court stated that genocide is a crime which all nations must prosecute; although the Bosnian criminal courts and the International Criminal Tribunal for the former Yugoslavia had primacy, both had declined to hear the case, and thus it fell to the German courts to apply the doctrine of universal jurisdiction under the Genocide Convention.

The European Court of Human Rights heard Jorgić's appeal in 2007 on the grounds that they had no jurisdiction (meaning the German courts were neither "competent", contrary to Article 5, nor "established by law", contrary to Article 6); that their refusal to summon certain witnesses abroad rendered his trial unfair, contrary to Article 6; and that their interpretation of the crime of genocide was too broad and the proper interpretation did not extend to his actions, amounting to a violation of article 7. The court deferred to the German courts' assessment of domestic provisions on jurisdiction, finding that they had reasonable grounds to claim jurisdiction under international law, thus there was no breach of Article 5 or 6. They also ruled the Article 6 claim on the grounds of unexamined evidence to be "manifestly ill-founded" and therefore inadmissible. In relation to the article 7 claim, the ECtHR stated that ethnic cleansing constituted genocide: interpreting genocidal intent as including the destruction of a group as a social unit, rather than restricting it to physical destruction, was "consistent with the essence" of the offence of genocide. Jorgić died in prison in 2014.
