= Research and Documentation Center in Sarajevo =

Research center in Bosnia and Herzegovina

Research and Documentation Center Sarajevo
- Istraživačko dokumentacioni centar Sarajevo
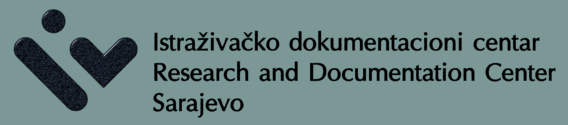
- Successor: Bosanski atlas ratnih zločina / Atlas of Bosnian War Crimes
- Formation: 1994; 32 years ago
- Type: NGO
- Headquarters: Sarajevo
- Location: Bosnia and Herzegovina
- Chair: Mirsad Tokača
- Website: Bosanski atlas ratnih zločina / Atlas of Bosnian War Crimes (successor organisation and online platform)

The Research and Documentation Center Sarajevo (RDC), (Bosnian: Istraživačko dokumentacioni centar Sarajevo (IDC)) was an NGO based in Sarajevo, Bosnia and Herzegovina, partly funded by the Norwegian government that aimed to gather facts, documents, and data on genocide, war crimes, and human rights violations in Bosnia and Herzegovina. It described itself as an independent, non-governmental, non-profit, professional and nonpartisan institution. RDC investigated issues regardless of the ethnic, political, religious, social, or racial affiliation of the victims.

The Center was made up of independent members, intellectuals and professionals from different academic disciplines. All of RDC's documents (witness statements, photo and video material, etc.) have been made available to the International Criminal Tribunal for the former Yugoslavia (ICTY) in The Hague, as well as to the Bosnian courts, non-governmental organizations (NGOs), scientific institutions and the media.

== The Bosnian Book of the Dead ==
In January 2013, the RDC published its final research on Bosnia-Herzegovina's war casualties, titled The Bosnian Book of the Dead. This database includes 97,207 confirmed names of Bosnia and Herzegovina's citizens killed during the 1992–1995 war, with an additional 5,100 unconfirmed names. An international team of experts evaluated the findings before they were released. The head of the ICTY Demographic Unit, Ewa Tabeu, called it "the largest existing database on Bosnian war victims".

Of the 97,207 casualties documented by 2013:

- 60% were soldiers, 40% civilians
- 90% were male
- 62% were Bosniaks, 25% Bosnian Serbs, and just over 8% Croats
- Of civilian victims, 82% were Bosniaks, 10% Bosnian Serbs, and 6.5% Bosnian Croats, with the remaining 0.5% including Jews, Roma and others.

The percentage of civilian victims would probably have been higher had survivors not reported their loved-ones as "soldiers" to access social services and other post-mortem benefits.

== Atlas of Bosnian War Crimes ==
Atlas of Bosnian War Crimes (Bosnian: Bosanski atlas ratnih zločina) is online resource developed through outsourcing data and documented evidences collected by IDC (RDC) and other sources, and using Google Earth technology, with a precise information and geo-locations of all documented war-crimes, civilian and military casualties, and destroyed and damaged properties, during the 1992-96 war in Bosnia and Herzegovina. It is available for (re)search via Internet (see url in Infobox and External links).
