= RAM Plan =

Plan for Greater Serbia

- Part of Breakup of Yugoslavia and precursor to the Bosnian War
- Operational scope: Strategic covert operation
- Type: Intelligence, paramilitary planning
- Location: * (Socialist Republic of Bosnia and Herzegovina) SR Bosnia and Herzegovina (Sarajevo, Banja Luka, Bijeljina, Doboj, Pale, others): (Socialist Republic of Croatia) SR Croatia (Slavonia); (Socialist Republic of Serbia) SR Serbia (Belgrade – command center); 43°52′N 18°25′E
- Planned: August 1991 – March 1992
- Planned by: Yugoslav People's Army; SDB Yugoslavia (Serbian branch)
- Commanded by: Veljko Kadijević – JNA Minister of Defence; Aleksandar Vasiljević – Head of JNA Counterintelligence; Radovan Karadžić – Leader of SDS
- Target: Municipalities with significant Serb populations; Strategic communication lines and state infrastructure
- Objective: Establishment of Serbian Autonomous Regions (SAOs); Coordination of SDS "Crisis Staffs" and parallel Serb governance; Arming and training of Bosnian Serb paramilitary groups; Collection of intelligence and psychological operations; Preparation for armed secession from SR Bosnia and Herzegovina
- Date: August 1991 – April 1992 (planning and setup)
- Executed by: Yugoslav People's Army; SDS-affiliated Serb paramilitary forces; Serbian Republic's State Security forces (SDB)
- Outcome: Operational network of Serb-controlled zones in BiH; Precursor to the creation of the Army of Republika Srpska; Set the stage for widespread ethnic violence

The RAM Plan, also known as Operation RAM, Brana Plan, or Rampart-91, was a military plan developed over the course of 1990 and finalized in Belgrade, Serbia, during a military strategy meeting in August 1991 by a group of senior Serb officers of the Yugoslav People's Army (JNA) and experts from the JNA's Psychological Operations Department. Its purpose was organizing Serbs outside Serbia, consolidating control of the Serbian Democratic Parties (SDS), and preparing arms and ammunition in an effort of establishing a country where "all Serbs with their territories would live together in the same state." A separate group of undercover operatives and military officers was charged with the implementation of the plan. These people then undertook numerous actions during the Yugoslav Wars that were later described as ethnic cleansing, extermination and genocide.

== Planning and leakage ==
The RAM (lit. "frame") Plan was developed over the course of 1990. It was finalized in Belgrade, Serbia during a military strategy meeting in August 1991 by a group of Serb officers of the Yugoslav People's Army (JNA), including General Blagoje Adžić, General Major Milan Gvero, Major Čedo Knežević, Lieutenant Colonel Radenko Radinović, and General Aleksandar Vasiljević, and experts from the JNA's Psychological Operations Department. In the same month Serbian president Slobodan Milošević and Radovan Karadžić met to discuss when to attack Bosnia and Herzegovina during which Karadžić was told his weapons delivery would arrive soon from General Nikola Uzelac, JNA commander of Banja Luka. During the conversation, Milošević mentioned RAM, asking Karadžić “You know what RAM is?“ to which Karadžić responded positively. Milošević and Karadžić were in regular contact by phone.

In September 1991, the existence of the RAM Plan was leaked by Yugoslav Prime Minister Ante Marković and its details were published in the Belgrade weekly Vreme. He says "the line has been clearly established [between the Serbian government, the army and Serb politicians in Bosnia and Herzegovina]. I know because I heard Milošević give the order to Karadžić to get in contact with General Uzelac and to order, following the decisions of the meeting of the military hierarchy, that arms should be distributed and that the TO of Krajina and Bosnia be armed and utilized in the realization of the RAM plan.". He accused the JNA of having "placed itself directly in the service of one side" and requested that Yugoslav Defense Minister Veljko Kadijević and Adžić resign, claiming the two were "waging their own war in Croatia" and that they had arranged a secret arms deal with conservative Soviet Union military leaders during their March 1991 visit to Moscow. Marković pressed Kadijević to comment on the RAM plan. The transcript of the tape leaked said:

Milošević: Go to Uzelac, he'll tell you everything. If you have any problems, telephone me.

Karadžić: I've got problems down in Kupres. Some Serbs there are rather disobedient.

Milošević: We can deal with that. Just call Uzelac. Don't worry, you'll have everything. We are the strongest.

Karadžić: Yes, yes.

Milošević: Don't worry. As long as there is the army no one can touch us. ... Don't worry about Herzegovina, Momir [Bulatović, president of Montenegro] said to his men: 'Whoever is not ready to die in Bosnia, step forward fives paces.' No one did so.

Karadžić: That's good ... But what's going on with the bombing in –

Milošević: Today is not a good day for the air force. The European Community is in session.

Vreme had reported that in addition to Bosnian Serb declarations of autonomy, effort was being taken to arm Serb villages and towns in Bosnia and Herzegovina as early as 1990 and continued into 1991. It detailed the origin of the weaponry and the JNA's involvement in the matter. During Milošević's trial at the International Criminal Tribunal for the former Yugoslavia a tape played from 8 July 1991 stated:

Milošević: Of strategic importance is the future of RAM, you know what RAM is?

Karadžić: Yes, I know everything, I know everything.

Milošević: The Banja Luka group is capable and mobile.

Karadžić: Good.

Milošević: So you have, one, that you ensure it is fit and mobile and that there are no problems. And, two, that in one hour you report to Uzelac with reference to the agreement.

Milošević later claimed that RAM was a codename indicating switching to secure communications and did not stand for a war plan, even though no such switch subsequently happened which Milošević did not explain as to why. Croatian historian Davor Marijan subsequently described the RAM plan claims as based on circumstantial evidence, saying no specific evidence of the plan has been provided as of 2012.

The September 1991 leak alarmed the Bosnian government, which decided to proclaim independence on 15 October. At the time the Croatian War of Independence was in full swing, and Serbian actions in Bosnia mirrored those of the Serbs in Croatia. In December 1991, Ante Marković resigned in protest against the excessive use of the Yugoslav budget on military spending which was dedicated 86 percent.

== Arrangements ==
"The substance of the plan was to create a greater Serbia. That RAM was to follow the lines of Virovitica, Karlovac, Karlobag, which we saw confirmed in reality later on with the decision on the withdrawal of the JNA, the Yugoslav People’s Army, from Slovenia and partly from Croatia to those positions."

— Jerko Doko, former Bosnian Minister of Defense in his testimony before the Hague

The plan's purpose was organizing Serbs outside Serbia, consolidating control of the Serbian Democratic Parties (SDS), and preparing arms and ammunition in an effort of establishing a country where "all Serbs with their territories would live together in the same state." In their plan, the officers described how artillery, ammunition, and other military equipment would be stored in strategic locations in Croatia and then in Bosnia and Herzegovina. The Secret Police would be used in arming and training the local Serbs to create "shadow" police forces and paramilitary units within the Croatian Krajina and in Bosnia and Herzegovina. These organized and armed Bosnian Serb paramilitary forces were to form the Army of Republika Srpska (VRS).

In implementing the plan, a consensus was formed on the chain of command being as limited as possible and resembling a "slim company". An informal group with selected generals that came to be known as the Military Line was created. Jovica Stanišić was installed as its head with Mihalj Kertes taking part as the "Minister of Ethnic Cleansing". It was determined Colonel Željko Ražnatović (Arkan) would direct it and that General Ratko Mladić and General Andrija Biorčević would coordinate "autonomous" groups like Vojislav Šešelj's White Eagles and Arkan's Serbian Volunteer Guard (SDG). Their research showed that the Bosniaks' (Bosnian Muslims) "morale, desire for battle, and will could be crushed more easily by raping women, especially minors and even children, and by killing members of the Muslim nationality inside their religious facilities." According to the minutes, a variant of the RAM Plan written had concluded that:

Our analysis of the behavior of the Muslim communities demonstrates that the morale, will, and bellicose nature of their groups can be undermined only if we aim our action at the point where the religious and social structure is most fragile. We refer to the women, especially adolescents, and to the children. Decisive intervention on these social figures would spread confusion [...], thus causing first of all fear and then panic, leading to a probable retreat from the territories involved in war activity. In this case, we must add a wide propaganda campaign to our well-organized, incisive actions so that panic will increase. We have determined that the coordination between decisive interventions and a well-planned information campaign can provoke the spontaneous flight of many communities.

Vladimir Srebrov, a politician who co-founded the SDS with Karadžić, had read the RAM Plan in 1992 and says the officers put forth a large campaign of ethnic cleansing "to destroy Bosnia economically and completely exterminate the Muslim people." He elaborated that:

The plan was drawn up in the 1980s by the General Staff of the Yugoslav People's Army (JNA). It envisaged a division of Bosnia into two spheres of interest, leading to the creation of a Greater Serbia and Greater Croatia. The Muslims were to be subjected to a final solution: more than 50% of them were to be killed, a smaller part converted to Orthodoxy, while an even smaller part - those with money, of course - was to leave for Turkey, by way of a so-called "Turkish corridor." The aim was cleanse Bosnia-Herzegovina completely of the Muslim nation, and to divide the country along the River Vrbas. The very name of Bosnia was to disappear. This was the aim behind the creation of "Republika Srpska."

In his attempts to plead with Serb nationalists to not pursue the plan, he was imprisoned and tortured by Serb militias.

== Implementation ==
"The Bosnian Serbs did take part. But the best combat units came from Serbia. These were special police commandos called Red Berets. They're from the Secret Service of Serbia. My forces took part, as did others. We planned the operation very carefully, and everything went exactly according to plan."

— Vojislav Šešelj, founder and president of the Serbian Radical Party

In 1990 and 1991, Serbs in Croatia and in Bosnia and Herzegovina had proclaimed a number of "Serbian Autonomous Oblasts" with the intent of later unifying them to create a Greater Serbia. In 1990, the Bosnian Territorial Defence was disarmed, artillery was positioned to encircle major cities, and a number of arms factories were moved from Bosnia and Herzegovina to Serbia. As early as September or October 1990, the JNA had begun arming Bosnian Serbs and organizing them into militias. By March 1991, the JNA had distributed an estimated 51,900 firearms to Serb paramilitaries and 23,298 firearms to SDS. As a result of the operation, Croatian and Bosnian Serbs were "well armed" by summer of 1991. According to historian Noel Malcolm the "steps taken by Karadžić and his party — [declaring Serb] "Autonomous Regions", the arming of the Serb population, minor local incidents, non-stop propaganda, the request for federal army "protection" – matched exactly what had been done in Croatia. Few observers could doubt that a single plan was in operation." The United Nations Commission of Experts (UNCoE) had examined that:

First, Bosnian Serb paramilitary forces, often with the assistance of the JNA, seize control of the area. In many cases, Serbian residents are told to leave the area before the violence begins. The homes of non-Serb residents are targeted for destruction and cultural and religious monuments, especially churches and mosques, are destroyed. Second, the area falls under the control of paramilitary forces who terrorize the non-Serb residents with random killings, rapes, and looting. Third, the seized area is administered by local Serb authorities, often in conjunction with paramilitary groups. During this phase, non-Serb residents are detained, beaten, and sometimes transferred to prison camps where further abuse, including mass killings, have occurred. Non-Serb residents are often fired from their jobs and their property is confiscated. Many have been forced to sign documents relinquishing their rights to their homes before being deported to other areas of the country.

Reports sent by Arkan to Milošević, Mladić, and Adžić state the plan were progressing, noting that the psychological attack on the Bosniak population in Bosnia and Herzegovina was effective and should continue. Evidence acquired by humanitarian organizations, including the United Nations and Human Rights Watch, corroborated that a policy of rape was organized and carried out. Their findings determined that "research, planning, and coordination of rape camps was a systematic policy of the Serbian government and military forces with the explicit intention of creating an ethnically pure state". The UNCoE concluded that "the practices of ethnic cleansing, sexual assault and rape have been carried out by some of the parties so systematically that they strongly appear to be the product of a policy." It stated in a follow-up report that it was "convinced that this heinous practice [rape and abuse of women] constitutes a deliberate weapon of war in fulfilling the policy of ethnic cleansing carried out by Serbian forces in Bosnia and Herzegovina, and [...] that the abhorrent policy of ethnic cleansing was a form of genocide."

In pursuit of the plan's "decisive intervention", Milan Dedić, the commander of the third battalion of the VRS, reported to Kertes that: "Sixteen hundred and eighty Muslim women of ages ranging from twelve to sixty years are now gathered in the centers for displaced persons within our territory. A large number of these are pregnant, especially those ranging in age from fifteen to thirty years. In the estimation of Boćko Kelević and Smiljan Gerić, the psychological effect is strong and therefore we must continue." Kertes told the Serb army that:

The Yugoslav Ministry of Internal Affairs [Serbian government] will open no inquests on the rapes since these constitute a part of the [army's] psychological and strategic pressure activities. In accordance with the Ministries of Health and Security, and upon the request of Dr. Vida Mandić and Colonel Loginov, it is established that a certain number of young women, the numbers to be agreed upon, will be transferred to Slavonia and Baranja for the needs of the Serb forces and also for the UNPROFOR officers.

== See also ==
- Partition of Bosnia and Herzegovina
- Variant A/B Instructions
