= Simon Ravn =

Danish composer

Simon Ravn (born 25 January 1974) is a Danish composer who composes orchestral music for film, television and video games.

Ravn was born in Copenhagen. In the late 1980s and early 1990s, he wrote music in the MOD format under the pseudonym "Melomaniac", and scored music for the Amiga game, Foundation.

== Prominent works ==
=== Video games ===
- Genetic Species (Amiga)
- 1999 Foundation (Amiga)
- 2004 CannonCruise
- 2005 Gangland
- 2006 Agent Hugo 2 - RoboRumble
- 2007 Lemoon Twist
- 2008 Viking: Battle for Asgard
- 2009 Empire: Total War
- 2010 Napoleon: Total War
- 2019 Total War: Three Kingdoms

=== Feature film ===
- 2005 Ainoa
- 2005 Bølle-Bob og Smukke Sally
- 2006 The Crumbs: A Very Crumby Christmas
- 2007 Anja & Viktor: Flaming Love - also known as Anja og Viktor - Brændende Kærlighed
- 2008 Anja & Viktor: In Sickness and in Health - also known as Anja & Viktor: I Medgang og Modgang
- 2010 Bølle Bob - Alle Tiders Helt
- 2012 Hvidsten Gruppen
- 2017 In Search of Peter Pan: På sporet af Peter Pan (documentary)

=== Television ===
- 2007 Milosevic on Trial
- 2008 The Cloud Mystery
- 2014 Hero Factory Episode 11: Invasion from Below

=== Trailers ===
- 2006 We Shall Overcome - also known as Drømmen
- 2005 Murk - also known as Mørke
- 2005 Dear Wendy
- 2004 Brothers
