= Trial of Milan Martić =

Prosecutor v. Martić
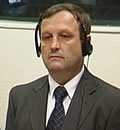
- Milan Martić
- Court: International Criminal Tribunal for the former Yugoslavia
- Full case name: The Prosecutor of the Tribunal v. Milan Martić
- Started: 2005
- Verdict: Guilty on 18 of 19 counts of the indictment
- Defendant: Milan Martić
- Citation: IT-95-11-T

Court membership
- Judges sitting: Bakone Justice Moloto, Janet Nosworthy, Frank Höpfel

The Prosecutor v. Milan Martić was a case (no. IT-95-11-T) brought before the International Criminal Tribunal for the Former Yugoslavia (ICTY) in The Hague, Netherlands, concerning war crimes committed during the Croatian War of Independence against Croats and other non-Serbs. He was found guilty on several counts, including murder, torture and persecution, and sentenced to 35 years in prison. It was the heaviest sentence delivered by the ICTY related to the Croatian War of Independence.

== Background ==
Milan Martić was born near Knin (present-day Republic of Croatia) on 18 November 1954. From January 1991 to August 1995, he held various positions within the government of the Serbian Autonomous Region of Krajina, which later evolved into the Republic of Serbian Krajina (RSK), including Chief of the Police in Knin, Secretary for Internal Affairs of the SAO Krajina, Deputy Commander of the Territorial Defense of the SAO Krajina, Minister of Defense of the SAO Krajina, Minister of the Interior of the SAO Krajina and the RSK and, from 25 January 1994 onward, President of the RSK. Martić surrendered in May 2002. He was transferred on 15 May 2002 to the ICTY in The Hague. On 21 May 2002, during his initial appearance, he pleaded not guilty to all the charges held against him in the indictment.

== Trial ==
The ICTY indictment, confirmed in 1995, spanned a period of between August 1991 and May 1995 during the Croatian War of Independence, covering such crimes as the Saborsko massacre, Baćin massacre, Škabrnja massacre, Bruška massacre, Siege of Kijevo, detentions at Knin camp, Korenica and Benkovac, as well as the Zagreb rocket attacks.

The trial lasted for 143 days. During the trial, the prosecution called 45 witnesses and had 901 exhibits. The defense presented 22 witnesses and had 90 exhibits. Martić was convicted of the following crimes:

Count 1, persecution as a crime against humanity;
Count 3, murder as a crime against humanity;
Count 4, murder as a violation of the laws or customs of war;
Count 5, imprisonment as a crime against humanity;
Count 6, torture as a crime against humanity;
Count 7, inhumane acts as a crime against humanity;
Count 8, torture as a violation of the laws or customs of war;
Count 9, cruel treatment as a violation of the laws or customs of war;
Count 10, deportation as a crime against humanity;
Count 11, forcible transfer as a crime against humanity;
Count 12, wanton destruction of villages or devastation not justified by military necessity as a violation of the laws or customs of war;
Count 13, destruction or willful damage done to institutions dedicated to education or religion as a violation of the laws or customs of war; and
Count 14, plunder of public or private property as a violation of the laws or customs of war;
Count 15, inhumane acts as a crime against humanity;
Count 16, attacks on civilians as a violation of the laws or customs of war

The Trial Chamber found that Martić participated in a joint criminal enterprise (JCE) by providing substantive financial, logistical, and military support to the SAO Krajina and the RSK, by actively working together with the other JCE participants to fulfill the objective of a "united Serb state", by exercising his authority over the Ministry of Internal Affairs (MUP) of the SAO Krajina and the RSK, by fuelling an atmosphere of insecurity and fear through public statements, and by participating in the forcible removal of the non-Serb population. It concluded that the crimes fell within the common purpose of the JCE, or were "foreseeable to Martić", and convicted Martić under the basic form of JCE for Counts 10, 11, and 1 (in part) and under the extended form of JCE for Counts 3 to 9, 12 to 14 and 1 (in part). The Trial Chamber acquitted Martić of Count 2, extermination as a crime against humanity. In the judgement, the judges concluded Martić was intricately linked with other Serb leaders who shared this criminal plan, including Slobodan Milošević, General Ratko Mladić and Republika Srpska President Radovan Karadžić, aimed at carving out an ethnically pure "Greater Serbia" from parts of Croatia.

The Trial Chamber further found that Martić ordered the shelling of Zagreb on 2 and 3 May 1995 with Orkan Rockets, containing cluster munitions. It held that he incurred individual criminal responsibility under Article 7(1) of the Statute for ordering under Count 15, murder as a crime against humanity; Count 16, murder as a violation of the laws or customs of war; Count 17, inhumane acts as a crime against humanity; Count 18, cruel treatment as a violation of the laws or customs of war; and Count 19, attacks on civilians as a violation of the laws or customs of war. The Trial Chamber did not enter convictions under Counts 16 and 18, having found that these crimes were impermissibly cumulative with Count 19. Martić was sentenced to 35 years imprisonment. Together with cases involving Tihomir Blaškić and Stanislav Galić, the Martić judgement established that an indiscriminate or a disproportionate attack can be a form of the crime of attack on civilians.

== Appeals Chamber ==
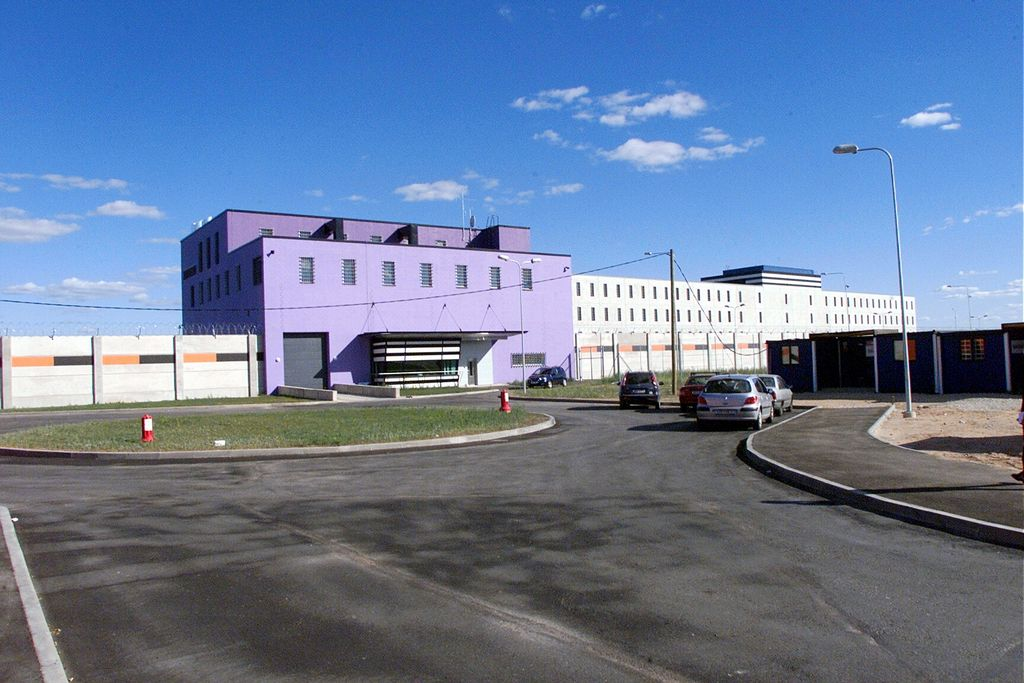
Tartu prison where Martić has been imprisoned since 2009

The Appeals Chamber of the ICTY accepted appeals from both Martić and the Prosecutor. The Defense requested the finding of a not guilty verdict or a re-trial based on alleged errors of law and fact. The Prosecution presented one ground of appeal, asking for a revision of the sentence due to an alleged error of law. Appeals hearings took place on 25–26 June 2008. The Appeals Chamber dismissed nine grounds of Martić's appeal and accepted two sub-grounds of the fifth ground of appeal, reversing Martić's convictions relating to specific alleged crimes committed in Cerovljani, Vukovići, and Poljanak. The Appeals judgement found that soldiers hors de combat cannot be considered as civilians, but that they could still be regarded as victims of crimes against humanity.

On 8 October 2008, the Appeals Chamber upheld the Trial Chamber's ruling. In June 2009 he was transferred to Tartu Vangla prison in Estonia to serve out his sentence.

== See also ==
- Trial of Stanislav Galić
- Trial of Ratko Mladić
- Trial of Slobodan Milošević
