= Baćin massacre =

Killing of 83 civilians in Croatia, 1991–1992

- Part of the Croatian War of Independence
- Baćin on the map of Croatia, JNA/SAO Krajina-held areas in late 1991 are highlighted in red
- Location: 45.203025°N 16.755828°E; Baćin, Croatia
- Date: 21 October 1991 – February 1992
- Target: Mostly Croats but also 2 Serbs
- Attack type: Summary executions, ethnic cleansing
- Deaths: 83 killed (21 October 1991); 118 killed in total by February 1992
- Perpetrator: SAO Krajina forces

The Baćin massacre was the killing of 83 civilians just outside the village of Baćin, near Hrvatska Dubica, committed by Croatian Serb paramilitaries. The killings took place on 21 October 1991 during the Croatian War of Independence. Most of the civilians were Croats, but they also included two ethnic Serbs, taken from Hrvatska Dubica, Baćin and the nearby village of Cerovljani. The civilians were killed in the area of Krečane, at the very bank of the Una River, and their bodies were left unburied for two weeks. Most of them were subsequently bulldozed into a shallow mass grave, while a number of the bodies were thrown into the river. Further killings of Croat civilians continued in Baćin and surrounding areas until February 1992.

The killings followed the takeover of Hrvatska Dubica and its immediate surroundings by the Serbian Autonomous Oblast Krajina (SAO Krajina) and the Yugoslav People's Army (Serbian: Jugoslovenska Narodna Armija – JNA) following the withdrawal of the Croatian National Guard (Croatian: Zbor narodne garde – ZNG) in mid-September, when the bulk of the civilian population left the area. The remaining Croat population in the area was either killed or expelled by November. A mass grave containing the bodies of 56 civilians killed in Baćin was uncovered in 1997, two years after Croatia recaptured the area. The event was included in the International Criminal Tribunal for the former Yugoslavia (ICTY) indictment against Slobodan Milošević and the ICTY indictment against Milan Martić. Milošević died before his trial concluded, and Martić was convicted and sentenced to 35 years in prison. Croatian authorities prosecuted and convicted seven other former SAO Krajina officers and officials in connection with the killings.

== Background ==
In 1990, ethnic tensions between Serbs and Croats worsened after the electoral defeat of the government of the Socialist Republic of Croatia by the Croatian Democratic Union (Croatian: Hrvatska demokratska zajednica – HDZ). The Yugoslav People's Army (Serbian: Jugoslovenska Narodna Armija – JNA) confiscated Croatia's Territorial Defence (Croatian: Teritorijalna obrana – TO) weapons to minimize resistance. On 17 August, the tensions escalated into an open revolt of the Croatian Serbs, centred on the predominantly Serb-populated areas of the Dalmatian hinterland around Knin (approximately 60 kilometres (37 miles) north-east of Split), parts of the Lika, Kordun, Banovina and eastern Croatia. In January 1991, Serbia, supported by Montenegro and Serbia's provinces of Vojvodina and Kosovo, unsuccessfully tried to obtain the Yugoslav Presidency's approval for a JNA operation to disarm Croatian security forces. The request was denied and a bloodless skirmish between Serb insurgents and Croatian special police in March prompted the JNA itself to ask the Federal Presidency to give it wartime authority and declare a state of emergency. Even though it was backed by Serbia and its allies, the JNA request was refused on 15 March. Serbian President Slobodan Milošević, preferring a campaign to expand Serbia rather than to preserve Yugoslavia with Croatia as a federal unit, publicly threatened to replace the JNA with a Serbian army and declared that he no longer recognized the authority of the federal Presidency. The threat caused the JNA to abandon plans to preserve Yugoslavia in favour of expansion of Serbia as the JNA came under Milošević's control. By the end of March, the conflict had escalated with the first fatalities. In early April, leaders of the Serb revolt in Croatia declared their intention to amalgamate the areas under their control with Serbia. These were viewed by the Government of Croatia as breakaway regions.

At the beginning of 1991, Croatia had no regular army. To bolster its defence, Croatia doubled its police numbers to about 20,000. The most effective part of the Croatian police force was 3,000-strong special police comprising twelve battalions organised along military lines. There were also 9,000–10,000 regionally organised reserve police in 16 battalions and 10 companies, but they lacked weapons. In response to the deteriorating situation, the Croatian government established the Croatian National Guard (Croatian: Zbor narodne garde – ZNG) in May by expanding the special police battalions into four all-professional guards brigades. Under Ministry of Defence control and commanded by retired JNA General Martin Špegelj, the four guards brigades comprised approximately 8,000 troops. The reserve police, also expanded to 40,000, was attached to the ZNG and reorganised into 19 brigades and 14 independent battalions. The guards brigades were the only units of the ZNG that were fully equipped with small arms; throughout the ZNG there was a lack of heavier weapons and there was poor command and control structure above the brigade level. The shortage of heavy weapons was so severe that the ZNG resorted to using World War II weapons taken from museums and film studios. At the time, the Croatian weapon stockpile consisted of 30,000 small arms purchased abroad and 15,000 previously owned by the police. To replace the personnel lost to the guards brigades, a new 10,000-strong special police was established.

== Prelude ==
By June 1991, Banovina declared itself a part of the Serbian Autonomous Oblast Krajina (SAO Krajina), and the Serb–Croat conflict began to escalate. Clashes peaked in late July, when Croatian Serb forces launched an offensive codenamed Operation Stinger. It was primarily aimed at the Croat-populated villages between Dvor and Hrvatska Kostajnica, and the police station in the town of Glina. The offensive was successful in securing Glina, and prompted the withdrawal of Croat forces from the Una River valley south and west of Hrvatska Kostajnica on 27 July. During the fighting, 12 Croatian policemen and 20 civilians were killed.

On 28 July, fighting resumed around Topusko, which was besieged by SAO Krajina forces that day, as well as around Hrvatska Kostajnica and Hrvatska Dubica. Combat in the area continued into August, and Hrvatska Kostajnica was besieged on 9 September. Three days later, SAO Krajina forces captured a major hill overlooking Hrvatska Kostajnica, prompting local Croatian forces to withdraw. On 13 September, Hrvatska Kostajnica was captured by SAO Krajina forces with JNA support. Approximately 300 Croatian troops retreated from the town or surrendered. The capture of the town was followed by killings, looting and torching of buildings in the town and surrounding villages. A total of 67 Croatian troops were captured in the town and shipped to the jail in Glina, but none arrived. SAO Krajina forces captured Hrvatska Dubica the same day, and Topusko fell on 14 September. On 21 September, Petrinja was captured by SAO Krajina forces and the JNA, denying Croatia an important bridgehead on the south (right) bank of the Kupa River.

== Timeline ==
Map of Banovina (modern county lines provided for reference)

On 13 September, after SAO Krajina forces captured Hrvatska Kostajnica and Hrvatska Dubica, the conflict shifted north, where a new line of control was established south of ZNG-controlled Sunja and Novska. Daily skirmishes continued there. After the ZNG pulled out of Hrvatska Kostajnica and Hrvatska Dubica, a substantial number of civilians left the area as well, leaving only about 120 Croat civilians in the two towns and the surrounding villages. About half of these stayed behind in Hrvatska Dubica, where looting and torching of houses owned by Croats or Serbs who had previously fled the town continued until mid-October. Most of the civilians who stayed in their homes were elderly or women.

Armed Serbs burnt Croat-owned houses in the village of Cerovljani, just to the north of Hrvatska Dubica, on 13 September and once more on 21 September. Three days later, the gunmen returned and after some shooting, three civilians were found dead and four more houses were torched in the village. The same day, the Catholic church bell tower was shot at using rocket-propelled grenades. In October, the armed Serbs gathered ten out of eleven remaining Cerovljani residents in the village's community centre, telling them they were to take part in a meeting. Instead, they were detained for the night and shipped away the next day to the Krečane area next to the village of Baćin, just to the west of Hrvatska Dubica and killed there. Approximately 30 elderly civilians remained in Baćin after SAO Krajina forces captured the village. All of them were taken to Krečane and killed in October as well, except for three men who were detained and killed in Hrvatska Dubica.

On the morning of 20 October, SAO Krajina police picked up 53 civilians in Hrvatska Dubica. Most of them were Croats, but there were several Serbs and ethnic Muslims. They were told they were being taken to a meeting, but they were detained under armed guard in the town's fire station. During the day, eleven people escaped or were released, either because they were Serbs or because they had Serb relatives. On 21 October, SAO Krajina forces moved 43 detainees from Hrvatska Dubica. The detainees were placed on a bus and told that they would be taken to Glina and released in a prisoner exchange. However the group, all of them Croats except for two Serbs, were taken to Krečane and killed. In the same period, an additional 24 civilians from villages around Hrvatska Dubica were killed by Serb forces at unknown locations.

The bodies of those killed at Krečane were left unburied for two weeks. Some of the victims were not immediately killed, rather they took days to die and people living on the opposite bank of the Una River in Bosnia and Herzegovina claim that they heard cries for help for days after the killings took place. After two weeks, most of the bodies were bulldozed into a shallow grave on the bank of the river, and the rest thrown into the Una. The grave was located sufficiently close to the river to allow the current to wash at least some of the bodies away.

== Aftermath ==
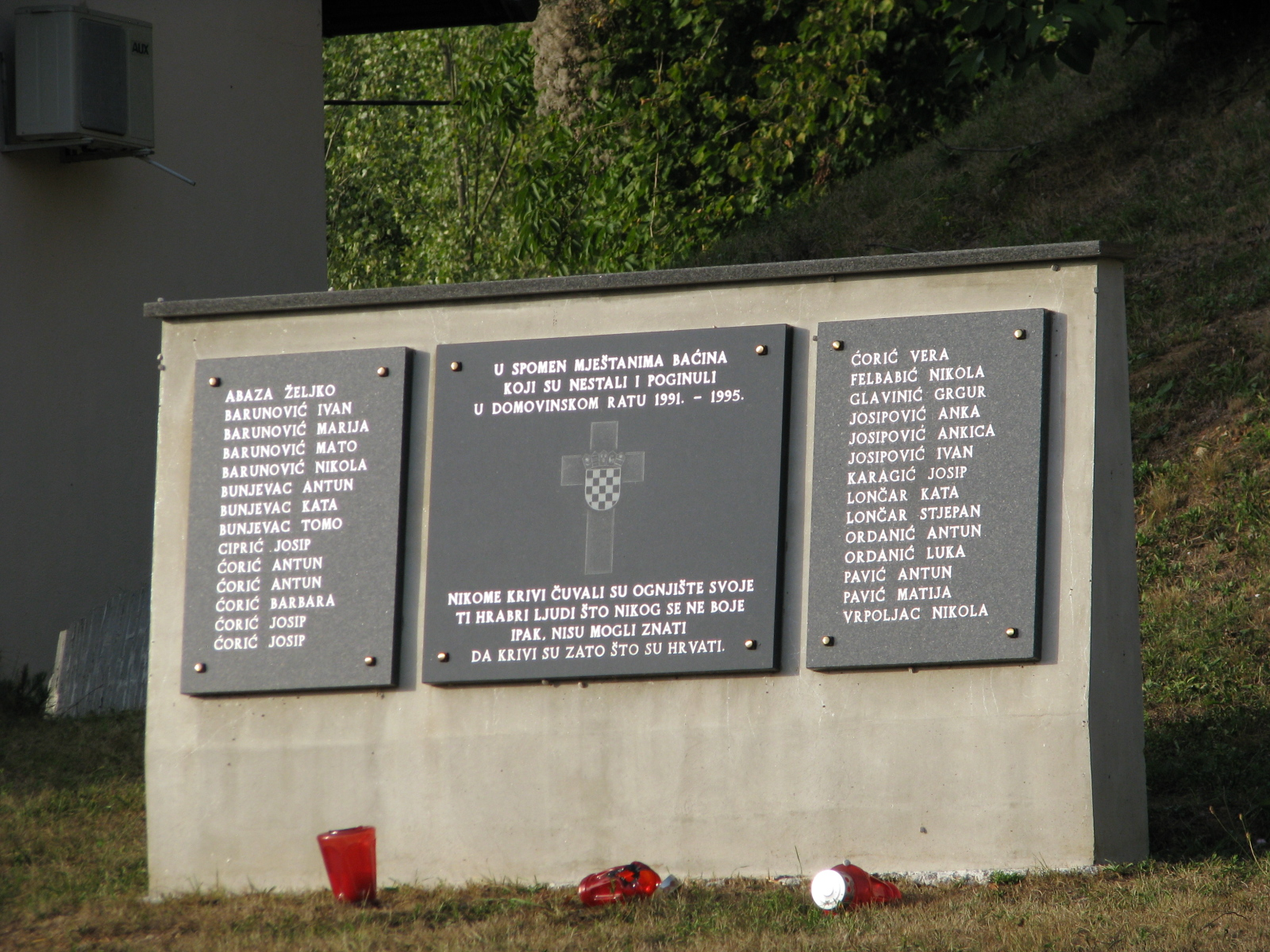
A monument to Baćin residents killed during the Croatian War of Independence.

All surviving Croat civilians were expelled from the area of Hrvatska Dubica on 20 November. At least 118 Croat and other non-Serb civilians were killed in Baćin and its vicinity by February 1992. By 1995, numerous Croat-owned houses in Hrvatska Dubica, all Croat-owned houses in Cerovljani and about half the Croat-owned houses in Baćin were torched, dynamited or otherwise destroyed. The Catholic churches in Hrvatska Dubica, Cerovljani and Baćin were destroyed, and the foundations of the church destroyed in Hrvatska Dubica were completely removed.

The mass grave at Krečane near Baćin was discovered in 1997, two years after Croatian authorities recaptured the area in Operation Storm. The mass grave contained 56 bodies, 36 of which were identified. The remaining twenty were buried in a common grave at the Catholic cemetery in Hrvatska Dubica.

The killings of the civilians taken from Hrvatska Dubica, Cerovljani and Baćin were included in the International Criminal Tribunal for the former Yugoslavia (ICTY) trial of Milan Martić, and the trial of Slobodan Milošević. Martić, who coordinated the combat activities of SAO Krajina forces and the JNA with Colonel Dušan Smiljanić, the security head of the JNA 10th (Zagreb) Corps in the area of Hrvatska Kostajnica, was convicted and sentenced to 35 years in prison for his role in an ethnic cleansing campaign against non-Serbs in Croatia. The judgment identified 83 civilians—the 43 taken from Hrvatska Dubica, 10 from Cerovljani and approximately 30 from Baćin who were killed at Krečani on or about 21 October 1991. Milošević died in custody in March 2006 before a verdict could be reached.

Croatian authorities prosecuted in absentia and convicted seven Croatian Serbs for killing of at least 75 persons in the Baćin massacre in 2013. Commanding officer of SAO Krajina TO in Dubica Milinko Janjetović, commander of SAO Krajina police in Dubica Momčilo Kovačević and two of their subordinates, Stevo Radunović and Veljko Radunović were sentenced to 20 years in prison each, and Stevan Dodoš was sentenced to 15 years in prison for organizing detention of the civilians and participation in their execution near Baćin. Head of the SAO Krajina civilian authorities in Dubica, Branko Dmitrović and the commander of SAO Krajina TO in Kostajnica, Slobodan Borojević, were sentenced to 15 years in prison each under the command responsibility for failing to prevent or punish the crime.

== See also ==
- List of massacres in Croatia
