= Markale massacres =

1994 bombardment of civilians in Sarajevo during the Bosnian War

Coordinates: 43°51′35″N 18°25′27″E

1st Markale Market Shelling
- Part of the Siege of Sarajevo
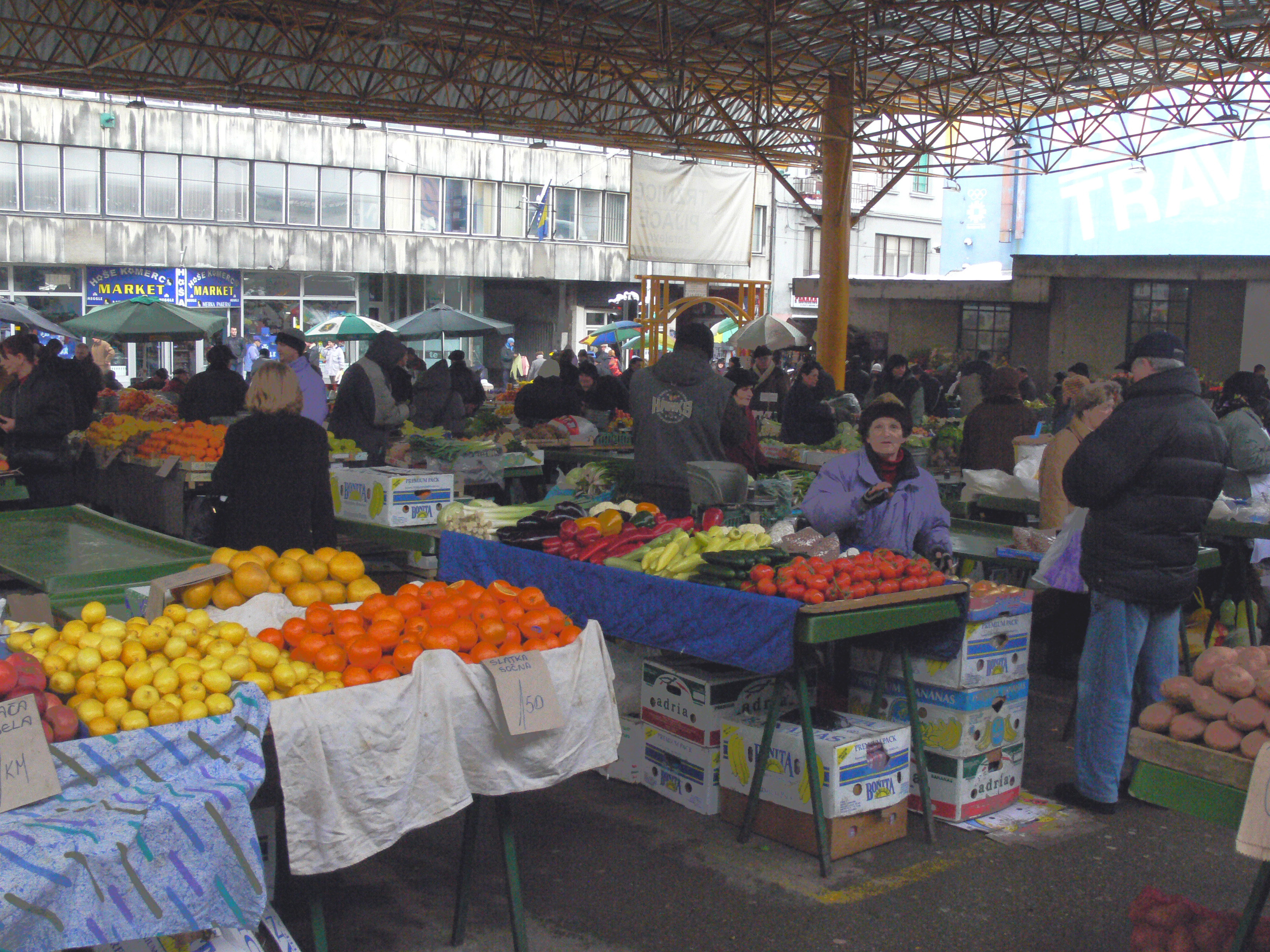
- The market in 2006
- Location: Sarajevo, Republic of Bosnia and Herzegovina
- Date: 5 February 1994; Between 12:10-12:15 (Central European Time)
- Target: Open air market
- Attack type: Mortar attack
- Deaths: 68
- Injuries: 144
- Perpetrator: Army of Republika Srpska

The Markale massacres were two bombardments, with at least one of them confirmed to have been carried out by the Army of Republika Srpska, targeting civilians at the Markale (marketplace) during the siege of Sarajevo in the Bosnian War. The first occurred on 5 February 1994; 68 people were killed and 144 more were wounded by a 120-millimetre (4.7 in) mortar. The second occurred on 28 August 1995 when five mortar shells launched by Army of Republika Srpska killed 43 people and wounded 75 others. The latter attack was the alleged reason for NATO air strikes (Operation Deliberate Force) against Bosnian Serb forces that would eventually lead to the Dayton Peace Accords and the end of the war in Bosnia and Herzegovina.

The responsibility of the Army of the Republika Srpska for the first shelling is contested, since investigations to establish the location from where the shells had been fired led to ambiguous results. Serb forces claimed that the Bosnian army had shelled its people to provoke intervention from Western countries on their side. The International Criminal Tribunal for the former Yugoslavia (ICTY) in its appeal judgement of Stanislav Galić in 2006 summarized the evidence and ruled that the conclusion that the shells had been fired from a location occupied by Serb forces was a reasonable one; nevertheless, Radovan Karadžić during his trial before ICTY tried to use this claim to his defence, but was found guilty.

== First massacre ==
The first massacre occurred between 12:10 and 12:15, on 5 February 1994, when a 120-millimeter mortar shell landed in the center of the crowded marketplace. Republika Srpska authorities denied all responsibility and accused the Bosnian government of shelling its people to incite international outrage and NATO intervention. Rescue workers and United Nations (UN) personnel rushed to help the numerous civilian casualties, while footage of the event soon made news reports across the world. Controversy over the event started when an initial UNPROFOR report claimed that the shell was fired from Bosnian government positions. General Michael Rose, the British head of UNPROFOR, revealed in his memoirs that three days after the blast he told General Jovan Divjak, the deputy commander of ARBiH forces, that the shell had been fired from Bosnian positions. A later and more in-depth UNPROFOR report noted a calculation error in the original findings. With the error corrected, the United Nations concluded that it was impossible to determine which side had fired the shell. In December 2003, the ICTY Trial Chamber in the trial against Stanislav Galić, a Serb general in the siege of Sarajevo (for which he was sentenced to life imprisonment for crimes against humanity), concluded that the massacre was committed by Serb forces around Sarajevo.

== Second massacre ==
2nd Markale Market Shelling
- Part of the Siege of Sarajevo
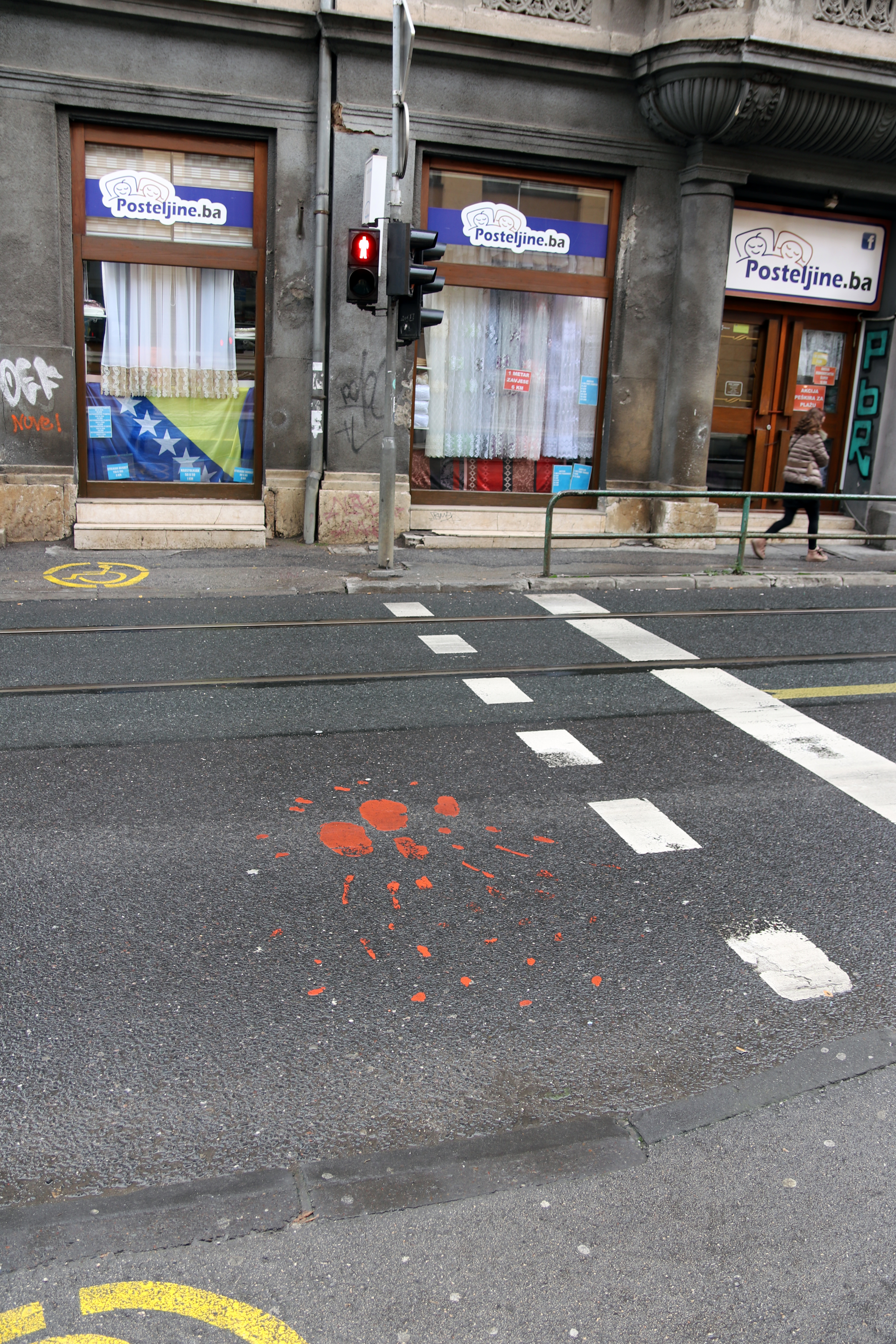
- Location of mortar shell's explosion
- Location: Sarajevo, Bosnia and Herzegovina
- Date: 28 August 1995; Approx. 11:00 (Central European Time)
- Target: Open air market
- Attack type: Mortar attack
- Deaths: 43
- Injuries: 75
- Perpetrator: Army of the Republika Srpska

The second massacre occurred about 18 months later, at around 11:00 on 28 August 1995. Just several hours before the attack, Bosnian Serb authorities tentatively expressed their will to accept Richard Holbrooke's peace plan. In this attack, five shells were fired, but casualties were fewer—43 dead and 75 wounded. Republika Srpska authorities, as in the 1994 incident, denied all responsibility and accused the Bosnian government of bombarding its people to incite international outrage and possible intervention. In a 1999 report to the United Nations General Assembly, UNPROFOR considered the evidence clear: a confidential report from shortly after the event concluded that the Army of Republika Srpska had fired all five rounds. The UNPROFOR investigation stated that "five rounds landed near the Markale Market at 11:10 on 28 August 1995. One round, in particular, caused the majority of the deaths, casualties and damage." They found that "After analysing all available data, the judgement was made that beyond reasonable doubt all mortar rounds fired in the attack on the Markale Market were fired from Bosnian Serb territory." The UNPROFOR investigation concluded that "Based on the evidence presented, the firing position of the five mortars was in BSA territory and probably fired from the Lukavica area at a range of between 3,000 and 5,000 meters." As soon as technical and weather conditions allowed, and the safety of UN personnel traveling through Serb territory was secured, Operation Deliberate Force commenced, a sustained bombing campaign against Bosnian Serb forces.

In contrast to UNPROFOR's finding that the fatal shell had been fired from the direction of Lukavica, the ICTY Trial Chamber in the Dragomir Milošević case was "persuaded by the evidence of the BiH police, the UNMOs and the first UNPROFOR investigation, which concluded that the direction of fire was 170 degrees, that is, Mount Trebevic, which was (Bosnian-Serb) SRK-held territory."

A second ICTY Trial Chamber in the Momčilo Perišić trial also found that "the mortar shell was fired from the (Bosnian-Serb) VRS held territory on the slopes of Mt. Trebevic." Colonel Andrei Demurenko, a Russian national, asserted that UNPROFOR's research was flawed, as it began from the conclusion that the shells were fired from Bosnian Serb positions and didn't test any other hypothesis; and that he, immediately visiting the supposed mortar locations, found that neither of them could be used to fire the shells. He concluded that Bosnian Serb forces had been falsely blamed for the attack to justify NATO attacks against Serbia.

David Harland, the former head of UN Civil Affairs in Bosnia, claimed at the trial of General Dragomir Milošević in ICTY, that he was responsible for the creation of the myth that UNPROFOR was unable to determine who had fired the mortar shells that caused the second Markale massacre. The myth that has survived for more than ten years, Harland said, was created because of a "neutral statement" made by General Rupert Smith, the UNPROFOR commander. On the day of the second Markale attack, General Smith stated "it is unclear who fired the shells", although at that time he already had the technical report of the UNPROFOR intelligence section, determining beyond reasonable doubt that they were fired from VRS positions at Lukavica. Harland himself had advised General Smith to make "a neutral statement in order not to alarm the Serbs who would be alerted to the impending NATO air strikes against their positions had he pointed a finger at them", which would have jeopardized the safety of UN troops in the territory under VRS control or on positions where they might have been vulnerable to retaliatory attacks by Serb forces.

== ICTY trials ==
In January 2004, prosecutors in the trial against Galić, a Bosnian Serb general, Sarajevo-Romanija Corps commander in the siege of Sarajevo, introduced into evidence a report including the testimony of ammunition expert Berko Zečević. Working with two colleagues, Zečević's investigation revealed a total of six possible locations from which the shell in the first Markale massacre could have been fired, of which five were under VRS and one under ARBiH control. The ARBiH site in question was visible to UNPROFOR observers at the time, who reported that no shell was fired from that position. Zečević further reported that certain components of the projectile could only have been fired from one of two places, both of which were under the control of the Army of Republika Srpska. The court would eventually find Galić guilty beyond reasonable doubt of all five shellings prosecutors had charged him with, including Markale. Although widely reported by the international media, the Helsinki Committee for Human Rights noted that the verdict was ignored in Serbia itself.

In 2007, Milošević, former commander of the Sarajevo-Romanija Corps, was found guilty of the shelling and sniper terror campaign against Sarajevo and its citizens from August 1994 to late–1995. He was sentenced to 33 years in prison. The Trial Chamber concluded the Markale town market had been hit on 28 August 1995 by a 120 mm mortar shell fired from the Sarajevo-Romanija Corps positions. In 2009, however, the ICTY Appeals Chamber overturned Milošević's conviction for the 28 August 1995 shelling of the Markale Market because at that time Milošević was in hospital in Belgrade, so that his deputy commander Čedomir Sladoje should be considered responsible for the shelling. Momčilo Perišić was acquitted by the ICTY Appeals Chamber in 2013.

According to Tim Judah, "The Serbian argument was grotesque, since what they wanted the world to believe was that of the hundreds of thousands of shells they fired, none had ever hurt anyone. As Miroslav Toholj, the novelist who became the Republika Srpska's information minister, put it, 'We Serbs never kill civilians.'"

Former UN observer Jan Segers claims that the UN forces were "almost sure" that the Serbs were not responsible for the February 1994 shelling. There were rumours of an explosive planted under a stall. Former UN official John Russell who carried out a crater analysis at the February 1994 site wrote in his journal on the night of the attack that he believed the Bosnian Army fired the shell, but said it was "impossible" to determine which side conducted the attack.
