= Dubica =

Dubica may refer to either of two towns divided by a state border:

- Dubica, Bosnia and Herzegovina, on the right bank, in Bosnia
- Hrvatska Dubica, on the left bank, in Croatia
