= Andrei Demurenko =

Russian army colonel (born 1955)

- Born: 28 April 1955 (age 71)
- Education: Moscow Higher Combined Arms Command School; Frunze Military Academy; United States Army Command and General Staff College
- Military career
- Allegiance: Soviet Union (to 1991); Russia
- Branch: Soviet Army; Russian Ground Forces
- Service years: 1976–1996; 2023
- Rank: Colonel
- Unit: 20th Guards Rifle Division
- Commands: "Wolf" infantry brigade
- Conflicts: Bosnian War; Siege of Sarajevo; Russo-Ukrainian War; Battle of Bakhmut (WIA)

Colonel Andrei Vladimirovich Demurenko (Note: Russian: Андрей Владимирович Демуренко) (born 28 April 1955) is a Russian military officer and commentator. He was the chief of staff of the United Nations Protection Force in the Sarajevo sector in 1995, during the Bosnian War, and was later the deputy director of the peacekeeping department at the Russian General Staff. Demurenko came out of retirement in 2023 to fight in the Russo-Ukrainian War, serving in the Battle of Bakhmut before being injured and removed from the front. He is the first and currently the only Russian officer to graduate from the United States Army Command and General Staff College.

== Early life and career ==
Demurenko was born on 28 April 1955 to a military family. He graduated from the Moscow Higher Combined Arms Command School and was commissioned as an officer in 1976. He also graduated from the Frunze Military Academy in 1984. He was commissioned into the motorized rifle troops, and later became an artilleryman. Demurenko initially served in the 20th Guards Rifle Division of the Soviet Group of Forces in Germany, and was sent to the Russian Far East after graduating from the Frunze Military Academy. During his career in the Soviet Army, Demurenko held commands at the platoon, company, battalion, and regimental level and also served in staff positions.

After the end of the Cold War, Lieutenant Colonel Demurenko was selected to attend the United States Army Command and General Staff College for the year 1992–1993, where he was sponsored by a U.S. Army foreign area officer. He was described by American officers who knew him as a "first-rate soldier" who "seemed destined for general stars." While he was in the United States, in May 1993 he took part in an exercise at the National Training Center in southern California, being an assistant to the commander of the opposing force that simulated two attacks on U.S. forces. Both of them were victories for the opposing force. He also wrote an article in Military Review comparing the courses at the CGSC and the Frunze Academy. Demurenko graduated in 1993, becoming the first, and as of 2009, the only Russian officer to have graduated from that college. It also made him the first Russian or American officer to graduate from the mid-level officer training institution of both countries, since he was also an alumnus of the Frunze Military Academy. After returning to Russia, he was promoted to colonel.

Due to his experience and English skills, when Russia sent a battalion of peacekeepers to the Bosnia-Herzegovina capital of Sarajevo in 1994, their second peacekeeping battalion in the former Yugoslavia, Demurenko was part of the deployment. From January to December 1995 he was the chief of staff of the United Nations Protection Force (UNPROFOR) Sarajevo sector. He was in that role when the second Markale massacre happened in August. He arrived at the scene two hours after it happened and carried out his own investigation into the incident. He concluded at the time that there was little probability that shelling from the Bosnian Serbs was the cause of the massacre, and said that the other UNPROFOR members were too quick to blame the Serbs before any investigation had been completed. Demurenko believed that it was not possible to determine which side caused the explosion based on the evidence.

Demurenko publicly opposed the claim by the UN and NATO that the Serbs were responsible for the massacre. Incidents of Serb shelling of Sarajevo were used as the justification by NATO for launching an air campaign in Bosnia around that time, and the controversy over the August 1995 Markale massacre led some in the Russian media to see it as a "provocation" to justify the NATO intervention against Bosnian Serbs. During his service in Sarajevo he also wrote a manual that compared the Russian and Western views on peacekeeping, titled Peacekeeping Operations: General Missions, Methods, Phases. Demurenko returned to Russia in January 1996, and was later among the first group of Russian officers to serve as representatives at the NATO headquarters. He was later in the Russian General Staff as the deputy director of its Peacekeeping Directorate and was also a member of its Main Operations Directorate. However, the situation in Russia changed after the events in Yugoslavia, and Demurenko was involuntarily retired in late 1996 because the military command perceived him as "too close to the Americans" and "in the enemy camp".

== Later life and return to service ==
During his retirement from the military, he initially worked at a bank before managing a shipyard in Saint Petersburg, and later directed operations for Russian Railways. He also spoke to the media and at other events as a military commentator. In 2012, Demurenko was the first witness called on by the defense at the trial of Radovan Karadžić by the International Criminal Tribunal for the former Yugoslavia. During his cross-examination by the prosecution he testified that his own investigation determined that the shelling that caused the Markale market massacre in Sarajevo in August 1995 was not fired from the positions held by the Army of Republika Srpska. He also testified again near the end of the trial in 2016.

At the outbreak of the 2022 Russian invasion of Ukraine, he volunteered to return to active service, but was initially rejected because of because of his old age. It took one year of working with the bureaucracy before he was accepted in February 2023. In March 2023, he arrived at the Battle of Bakhmut as first deputy commander of the "Wolf" infantry brigade that covered the flank of the Wagner Group forces. The brigade was led by a Serbian officer who had previously served in Syria, but Demurenko was the de facto commander because of his experience and language ability. Their unit defended the northern flank of Wagner forces during the battle, at the village of Zaliznianske. In May 2023, while on a reconnaissance mission, he received a head injury during an artillery strike. He was withdrawn from the front line because of the injury and evacuated to Moscow for treatment.

== Personal life ==
He is married and has a son and a daughter.

== Sources ==
- Kipp, Jacob W.; Warren, Tarn (2003). "The Russian Separate Airborne Brigade – Peacekeeping in Bosnia-Herzegovina". In Mackinlay, John; Cross, Peter (eds.). Regional peacekeepers: The paradox of Russian peacekeeping (PDF). Tokyo: United Nations University. ISBN 92-808-1079-0.
- Zisk, Kimberly Marten (Summer 1999). "Contact Lenses: Explaining U.S.-Russian Military-to-Military Ties". Armed Forces & Society. 25 (4): 579–611. doi:10.1177/0095327X9902500404. JSTOR 45346330.
