= Ivo Kozarčanin =

Croatian writer (1911–1941)

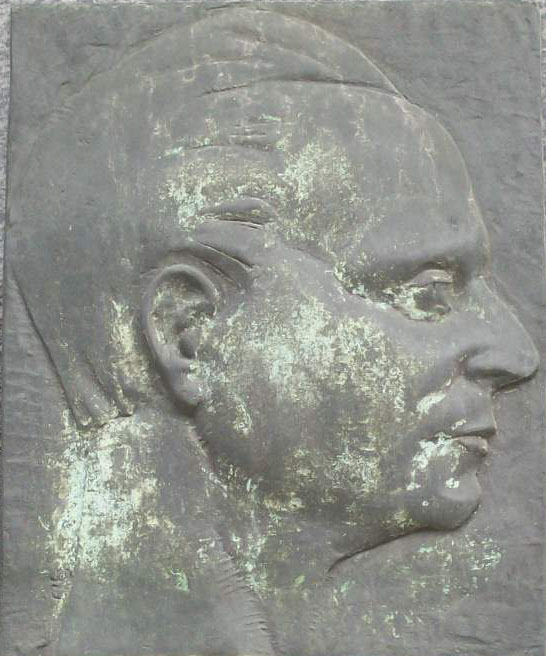
Ivo Kozarčanin relief

Ivo Kozarčanin (Hrvatska Dubica, October 14, 1911 - Zagreb, February 4, 1941) was a Croatian writer, poet and literary critic.

Soon after his birth Kozarčanin's family moved to the Hungarian town of Oreglak, where his faither worked on the railroad. With the dissolution of the Austro-Hungarian Empire in 1918 his family returned to Hrvatska Dubica where Kozarčanin attended elementary and merchant schools. In 1923 he came to Zagreb where he continued his education. In 1932 he enrolled at the University of Zagreb's Faculty of Philosophy. From 1938 he was the editor of the cultural magazine Hrvatski dnevnik. He died after being shot by an armed guard of the Royal Yugoslav Army on February 4, 1941.

== Works ==
- Mati čeka (1934)
- Sviram u sviralu (1935)
- Lirika (1935)
- Tuga ljeta
- Mrtve oči
- Tuđa žena (1937)
- Sam čovjek (1937)
- Tihi putovi (1939)
