= Sarajevo Rose =

Memorials of the Siege of Sarajevo found in Sarajevo, Bosnia and Herzegovina

- Sarajevska ruža
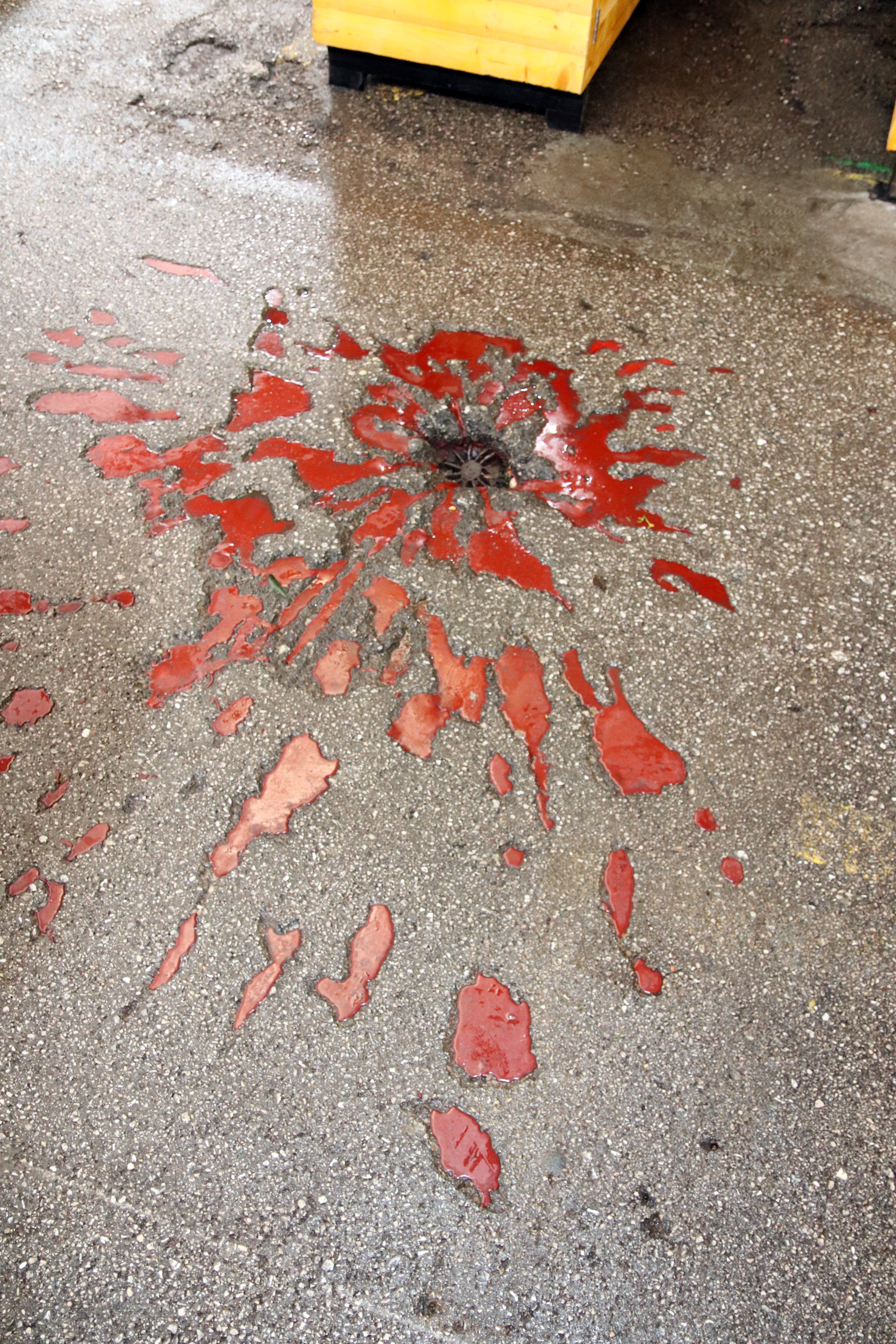
- Sarajevo Rose marking first Markale massacre
- Location: Sarajevo
- Material: concrete, asphalt
- Dedicated to: Siege of Sarajevo

A Sarajevo Rose (Bosnian: Sarajevske ruže) is a type of memorial in Sarajevo made from concrete scar caused by a mortar shell's explosion that was later filled with red resin. Mortar rounds landing on concrete during the siege of Sarajevo created a unique fragmentation pattern that looks almost floral in arrangement, and therefore have been named "rose".

There are around 200 "roses" in the entire city, and they are marked on locations where at least three people were killed during the siege of Sarajevo.

In addition to the official marking of "roses" by the Ministry of Veterans' Affairs of Canton Sarajevo, some of them are marked or recolored by citizens themselves.

== Reconstruction ==
Since these memorials are located on streets, through the years they have been damaged by pedestrians and vehicles, and therefore several reconstructions (in 2012, 2015 and 2018) have been done to preserve the memorials.

The Sarajevo Rose located on Markale market, where the first Markale massacre occurred, was covered with glass, but this type of protection was not practical, and therefore it is planned to protect it with a 3.2 m cone with an LED light on the top.
