= Živaja =

- Village
- Location of Živaja within Croatia
- Coordinates: 45°14′N 16°43′E
- Country: Croatia
- Region: Banija
- County: Sisak-Moslavina
- Municipality: Hrvatska Dubica

Area
  - Total: 46.8 km^{2} (18.1 sq mi)
- Elevation: 97 m (318 ft)

Population (2021)
  - Total: 179
  - Density: 3.82/km^{2} (9.91/sq mi)
- Time zone: UTC+1 (CET)
  - Summer (DST): UTC+2 (CEST)
- Postal code: 44450
- Area code: 044

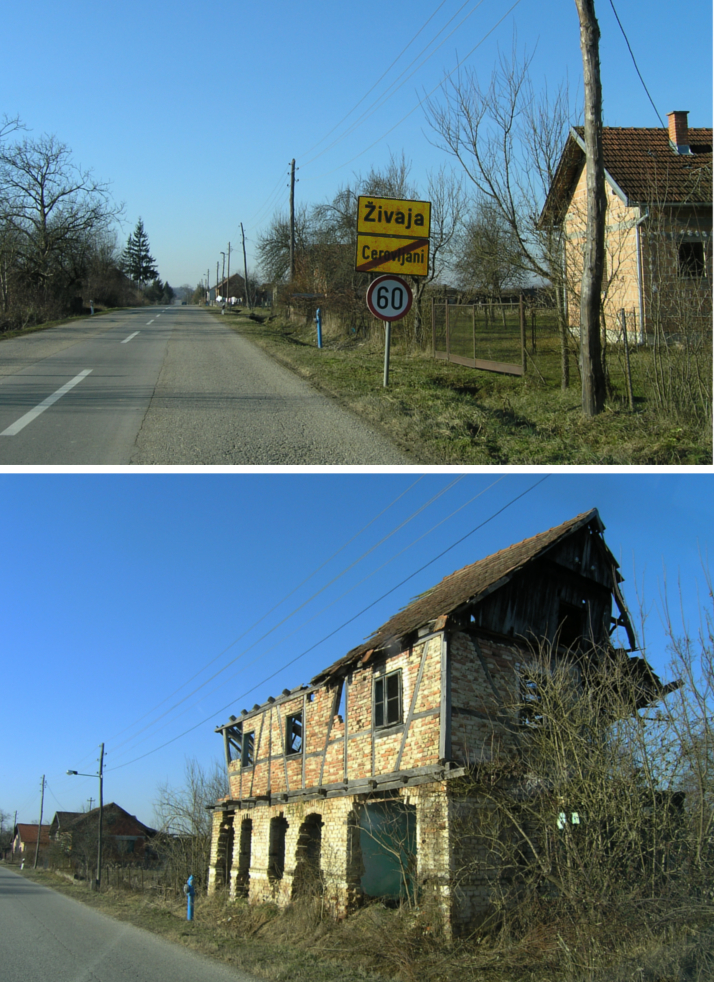
Živaja and destroyed house

Živaja is a village in central Croatia in Hrvatska Dubica, a municipality of Sisak-Moslavina County.

== Location ==
Živaja is located between the villages of Dubica and Sunja. It is 7 kilometers in length, making it one of the longest villages in the region. It is spread over approximately 30 square kilometers. Due to its position between two rivers, the Sava and Una, the village has a horseshoe shape.

The village features dense housing, as well as typical suburban housing on either side of the main road. The railroad runs parallel to the road from south-east to north-west on the east side. This part of the village is a mostly flat, lowland area. The eastern area of the village is in the same flat area, and the lowland continues for around 1.5–2 km. This area extends to the great forest farms that extend through the valley to the Sava River.

== Population ==
In 1991, Živaja had 726 residents, and in 1969 there were 800. According to the 1991 census, 90.91% of the village population were ethnic Serbs (660/726), 1.93% were ethnic Croats (14/726), 1.24% were Yugoslavs (9/726), and 5.92% and were of other ethnic origins (43/726).

According to data gathered in 2001, the village had 484 inhabitants and approximately 290 houses.

In the 2011 population census, ethnic Croats made up 65.70% (203/309) of the village population while ethnic Serbs made up only 31.39% (97/309).

Population growth 1857–2011
v

population	792	982	1048	1187	1178	1357	1317	1444	1062	1057	1055	943	800	726	484	309
	1857	1869	1880	1890	1900	1910	1921	1931	1948	1953	1961	1971	1981	1991	2001	2011

Sources: Croatian Bureau of Statistics publications

== History ==
After World War II, the population of the village worked mainly in agriculture and livestock breeding. Because of proximity to city centers (Petrinja, Sisak, Zagreb) and the existence of traffic connections with those cities, along with industrial development, in the late 1950s and early 1960s, people increasingly worked in factories. A large part of the male population was employed in the cities.

Between 1969 and 1991, the average age of the population in the village increased, which points to the possibility that the working-age population largely fled the village.

== Traffic connections ==
State Road D224 passes through Živaja from south-east to north-west.

Živaja has a train station. The railroad that passes parallel to the village, about 300 meters away, is classified as a railway of importance to international trade. As part of the railway line on the Pan-European Corridor X labeled M1, a part of this railway branch bears the label M104 and the full name of Zagreb Main Station - Sisak-Novska. This railway extends to the city of Vinkovci in the east, and ultimately to the Croatia-Serbia border.

The distance to Živaja on the Auto-D4 road is 10 km from Dubica; 25 km from Kostajnica; 46 km from Sisak; 101 km from Zagreb; 91 km from Banja Luka, Bosnia and Herzegovina; 325 km from Belgrade; and 280 km from Sarajevo.
