= Trial of Slobodan Milošević =

UN Criminal Tribunal's trial of Yugoslavia's dictator during the Yugoslav Wars

Prosecutor v. Milošević
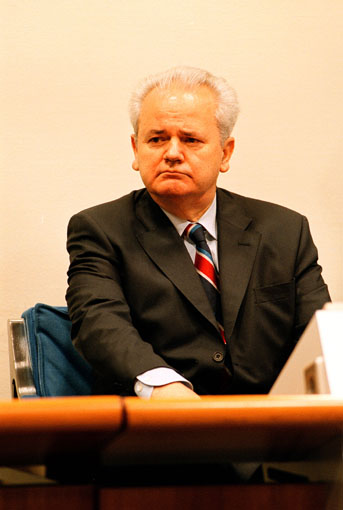
- Slobodan Milošević at the ICTY courtroom
- Court: International Criminal Tribunal for the former Yugoslavia
- Full case name: The Prosecutor of the Tribunal v. Slobodan Milošević
- Verdict: Died in detention
- Defendant: Slobodan Milošević
- Prosecution: Carla del Ponte, Geoffrey Nice
- Citation: IT-02-54

Court membership
- Judges sitting: Patrick Robertson, O-Gon Kwon, Iain Bonomy

The war crimes trial of Slobodan Milošević, the former President of the Federal Republic of Yugoslavia, at the International Criminal Tribunal for the former Yugoslavia (ICTY) at The Hague lasted for just over four years from 2002 until his death in 2006. Milošević faced 66 counts of crimes against humanity, genocide, and war crimes committed during the Yugoslav Wars of the 1990s, and was extradited to The Hague on 28 June 2001. He pleaded not guilty to all the charges. He was the first sitting head of state to be charged with war crimes by an international tribunal.

In 2016, the ICTY issued a judgement in the separate trial of Radovan Karadžić, which concluded that there was no sufficient evidence from that particular case that Milošević had "participated in the realization of the common criminal objective" and that he "and other Serbian leaders openly criticised Bosnian Serb leaders of committing crimes against humanity and ethnic cleansing and the war for their own purposes" during the Bosnian War. However, he was found to be part of a joint criminal enterprise (JCE) in the judgments of Milan Martić, Nikola Šainović et al., and Jovica Stanišić and Franko Simatović.

== Background ==
On 27 May 1999, during the Kosovo War, Slobodan Milošević was indicted by the UN's International Criminal Tribunal for the Former Yugoslavia (ICTY) for crimes against humanity, violating the laws or customs of war or grave breaches of the Geneva Conventions in Kosovo. The indictment alleged Milošević was responsible for the deportation of 800,000 Albanians. An annex listed names of 900 people killed in Kosovo in 1999.

In October 2001, the ICTY expanded the charges against Milošević and indicted him for war crimes and crimes against humanity committed during the Croatian War of Independence, by participating in a joint criminal enterprise (JCE) between August 1991 and June 1992 aimed at removing 170,000 Croats and other non-Serbs from a third of Croatia. The indictment alleged 32 counts of war crimes, with an annex listing 694 murdered people in Vukovar, Dubrovnik, Dalj, Erdut, Škabrnja, and other Croatian towns.

In November 2001, Milošević was indicted again, for war crimes, crimes against humanity, and genocide committed during the Bosnian War between 1992 and 1995, including for the deportation of over a quarter million Bosniaks, Croats and other non-Serbs, as well as the Siege of Sarajevo, the Srebrenica massacre, and Omarska concentration camp killings. The ICTY prosecutors alleged Milošević tried to build an ethnically pure "Greater Serbia".

The charges on which Milošević was indicted were: genocide; complicity in genocide; deportation; murder; persecutions on political, racial or religious grounds; inhumane acts/forcible transfer; extermination; imprisonment; torture; willful killing; unlawful confinement; willfully causing great suffering; unlawful deportation or transfer; extensive destruction and appropriation of property, not justified by military necessity and carried out unlawfully and wantonly; cruel treatment; plunder of public or private property; attacks on civilians; destruction or willful damage done to historic monuments and institutions dedicated to education or religion; unlawful attacks on civilian objects.

== The trial ==
=== Duration of trial ===
Following Milošević's transfer, the original charges of war crimes in Kosovo were upgraded by adding charges of genocide in Bosnia and war crimes in Croatia. On 30 January 2002, Milošević accused the war crimes tribunal of an "evil and hostile attack" against him. The trial began at The Hague on 12 February 2002, with Milošević defending himself. Milošević remained defiant during the process; at the end of his first appearance, he mocked the brevity of the session by looking at his watch and saying "Fifteen minutes."

The trial lasted four years, though the prosecution took about 14 months in trial time to present its case, where they covered the wars in Croatia, Bosnia, and Kosovo. The trial was followed by the public of the involved former Yugoslav republics.

During the prosecution case, 295 witnesses testified and 5,000 exhibits were presented to the court recording a mass of evidence. After the presentation of the prosecution case, the Trial Chamber, on 16 June 2004, rejected a defense motion to dismiss the charges for lack of evidence and ruled in accordance with Rule 98bis, that the prosecution case contains evidence capable of supporting a conviction on all 66 counts. The Defense was given the same amount of time as the prosecution to present its case. There were in total 466 hearing days, four hours per day. 40 hours were left in the Defense case, and the trial was on schedule to end by the end of the spring.

The prosecution was directed by the trial chamber to conclude its Kosovo case during four and a half to five months time span to make way for the presentation in September 2002 of the Bosnia and Croatia cases, followed by a defense case if Milošević wanted to do so. Initially the length of the trial was presumed to go for two years and instead lasted four that contained multiple adjournments which ended with Milošević's death prior to his defense case being completed.

=== Kosovo case ===
Milošević was indicted for crimes during the Kosovo war, charged with violating international humanitarian law on five counts during 1 January-20 June 1999. The first charge was Deportation (a crime against humanity). The prosecution stated in their case against Milošević that he was part of a criminal enterprise and involved in orchestrating a campaign of violence and terror to force a sizable part of the Kosovo Albanian population to leave and maintain Serb control over Kosovo. The second charge was Other inhumane Acts - Forcible transfer (a crime against humanity), which is similar to the charge of deportation though additionally implying use of force encompassing internal displacement. The third and fourth charge entailed Murder (combined in this instance as a crime against humanity and violating the customs and laws of war). Six hundred Kosovars were identified in the indictment as being killed in sixteen individual incidents during mass expulsion. In addition based upon the exhumations of mass graves and the number of missing persons, human rights organisations estimated around ten thousand Kosovars being killed during hostilities, with KLA combatants only forming a small minority of the deceased. Also counted were unarmed combatants killed in violation of the ICTY statute and Geneva Conventions. The fifth charge was Persecutions (a crime against humanity). The indictment referred to Milošević using mass forced population deportation and transfer, sexual assault, murder, along with damage or destruction of Kosovo Albanian religious sites "to execute a campaign of persecution against the Kosovo Albanian based on political, racial or religious grounds".

The ICTY indictment against Milošević referred to methods of persecution done against Kosovo Albanians to "wreak systematic and wanton destruction and damage to their religious sites and cultural monuments". The prosecution in the trial sought to prove Milošević guilty of those actions and events. In his defense, Milošević asserted that Kosovo Albanian heritage sites, in addition to Serb Orthodox historical and religious monuments were damaged by NATO bombing. Yugoslav Serb authorities in several cases alleged that NATO destroyed monuments, however the investigative team led by András Riedlmayer found them intact like two Ottoman bridges and the Sinan Pasha Mosque. Investigators absolved NATO of responsibility except for damage to a village mosque roof and a disused Catholic church damaged through an air blast after a nearby army base was struck by a missile. Riedlmayer's report to the Milošević trial concluded that kulla dwellings and a third of mosques were subjected to damage and destruction, with three Ottoman period urban centres being devastated due to intentionally lit fires. The report also noted that the Yugoslav Serb army, paramilitary and police forces and in some instances Serb civilians did those attacks, according to eyewitness accounts. Riedlmayer found out that Yugoslav Serb forces used as bases of operation two Catholic churches which in international law was prohibited. The investigative team noted that destruction and damage of Kosovo Albanian heritage sites were done during the 1999 war through ground attack and not air strikes.

Charges relating to crimes against humanity, the prosecution had to prove that armed conflict occurred, systematic and widespread attack existed, the conduct of Milošević was related to systematic and widespread attack upon a civilian population and that he was aware of the wider situation where his conduct happened. The prosecution also had to prove that Milošević had the necessary state of mind for crimes that were wilful, intentional or having a disregard of consequences for human life by actions committed by himself or his subordinates. Apart from the need to prove intent for committing the crime of persecution, the prosecution had to demonstrate that those actions were undertaken with intent toward discriminating on religious, political and racial grounds. Within the context of Milošević as an individual, charges against him related to individual and command responsibility. In the case against Milošević, he was accused of ordering, planning, instigating alongside aiding and abetting toward planning, preparing and executing crimes, with the act of committing being in reference to participating in a criminal enterprise and not being physically responsible for crimes. Milošević was also charged by the prosecutor for failure of his command responsibility and responsibility as a superior for acts done by subordinates where a superior was aware or knew that a subordinate was on the verge of violating international humanitarian law or committing war crimes; and that a superior failed to undertake measures to stop actions or punish perpetrators. Command responsibility was held by Milošević the prosecution alleged due to his position along with control and power, having no regard toward his position or both.

=== Croatia case ===
Milošević was indicted for war crimes in Croatia, including the Battle of Vukovar, Siege of Dubrovnik, the Dalj massacre, Erdut killings, Škabrnja massacre, Lovas killings, deportations (including 5,000 from Ilok and 2,500 from Erdut), as well as holding Croat and non-Serb POW in camps in Serbia, such as Begejci and Stajićevo camp. Witnesses called to testify against Milošević included the former Republic of Serbian Krajina President Milan Babić, a secret witness who claimed she was a secretary in Belgrade headquarters observing how the paramilitary Serb Volunteer Guard led by Arkan, that fought in Croatia and Bosnia, received money and orders from Milošević, President of Croatia Stjepan Mesić, former head of the Counterintelligence Service of Yugoslavia Aleksandar Vasiljević, the last Prime Minister of Yugoslavia Ante Marković, and others.

== Milošević's death ==
Milošević was found dead in his cell on 11 March 2006, in the UN war crimes tribunal's detention center, located in the Scheveningen section of The Hague, Netherlands. The proceedings against him were terminated three days later, which effectively ended the trial.

Post-mortems soon established that Milošević had died of a heart attack. He had been suffering from heart problems and high blood pressure. Many suspicions were voiced to the effect that the heart attack had been caused or made possible deliberately – by the ICTY, according to sympathizers, or by himself, according to critics.

Milošević’s death occurred shortly after the Tribunal denied a request to seek specialized medical treatment at a cardiology clinic in Russia instead of the Netherlands.

ICTY Chief Prosecutor Carla Del Ponte delivered her public statement following Milošević's death:

In the indictment which was judicially confirmed in 2001, Milošević was accused of 66 counts of genocide, crimes against humanity and war crimes committed in Croatia, Bosnia and Herzegovina and Kosovo between 1991 and 1999. These crimes affected hundreds of thousands of victims throughout the former Yugoslavia.

Due to Milošević's death during the trial, the court returned no verdict on the charges.

== Posthumous verdicts ==
Following Milošević's death, he was found to be a part of a joint criminal enterprise which used crimes to remove Croats, Bosniaks, and Albanians from large parts of Croatia, Bosnia and Herzegovina, and Kosovo according to four posthumous verdicts.

In 2007, in its verdicts against Republic of Serbian Krajina President Milan Martić, the ICTY concluded:

Between 1991 and 1995, Martić held positions of minister of interior, minister of defense and president of the self-proclaimed "Serbian Autonomous Region of Krajina" (SAO Krajina), which was later renamed "Republic of Serbian Krajina" (RSK). He was found to have participated during this period in a joint criminal enterprise which included Slobodan Milošević, whose aim was to create a unified Serbian state through commission of a widespread and systematic campaign of crimes against non-Serbs inhabiting areas in Croatia and Bosnia and Herzegovina envisaged to become parts of such a state.

— International Criminal Tribunal for the former Yugoslavia, verdict against Milan Martić

In 2016, the ICTY issued its judgement in the separate trial of Radovan Karadžić, which concluded that insufficient evidence had been presented in that case to find that Milosevic "agreed with the common plan" to create territories ethnically cleansed of non-Serbs during the Bosnian War. The judgement noted that "Milošević's repeated criticism and disapproval of the policies and decisions made by [Karadžić] and the Bosnian Serb leadership" and, in a footnote, the "apparent discord between [Karadžić] and Milošević" during which Milošević "openly criticised Bosnian Serb leaders of committing 'crimes against humanity' and 'ethnic cleansing' and the war for their own purposes." Nevertheless, the court also noted that Milošević also "shared and endorsed the political objective of the Accused [Karadžić]" and "provided assistance in the form of personnel, provisions, and arms to the Bosnian Serbs during the conflict".

In 2021, in its verdict against Serbia's operatives Jovica Stanišić and Franko Simatović, the follow-up International Residual Mechanism for Criminal Tribunals concluded:

The Trial Chamber, therefore, finds proven beyond reasonable doubt that, from at least August 1991, and at all times relevant to the crimes charged in the Indictment, a common criminal purpose existed to forcibly and permanently remove, through the commission of the crimes of persecution, murder, deportation and inhumane acts (forcible transfer), the majority of non-Serbs, principally Croats, Bosnian Muslim and Bosnian Croats, from large areas of Croatia and Bosnia and Herzegovina. The Trial Chamber finds that the common criminal purpose, as defined above, was shared by senior political, military, and police leadership in Serbia, the SAO Krajina, the SAO SBWS, and Republika Srpska, with the core members, among others and varying depending on the area and timing of the commission of the crimes, being Slobodan Milošević.

— International Residual Mechanism for Criminal Tribunals, verdict against Stanišić and Simatović

In the two Kosovo verdicts, the Nikola Šainović et al. and Vlastimir Đorđević cases, Milošević was found to have been "one of the crucial members" of the criminal enterprise aimed at uprooting large parts of Albanians from Kosovo.

== See also ==
- Trial of Ratko Mladić
- Trial of Stanislav Galić
- Trial of Milan Martić
- Slobodan Milosevic – Glosses at a trial, a two-part documentary
- Milosevic on Trial, a 2007 Danish documentary
- Milosevic at the Hague, a play

== Sources ==
- "The Prosecutor of the Tribunal against Slobodan Milošević (IT-02-54) - Amended Indictment (Croatia)" (PDF). International Criminal Tribunal for the former Yugoslavia. October 22, 2002.
- Armatta, Judith (2010). Twilight of Impunity: The War Crimes Trial of Slobodan Milosevic. Durham: Duke University Press. ISBN 9780822391791.
