= Baćin =

- Village
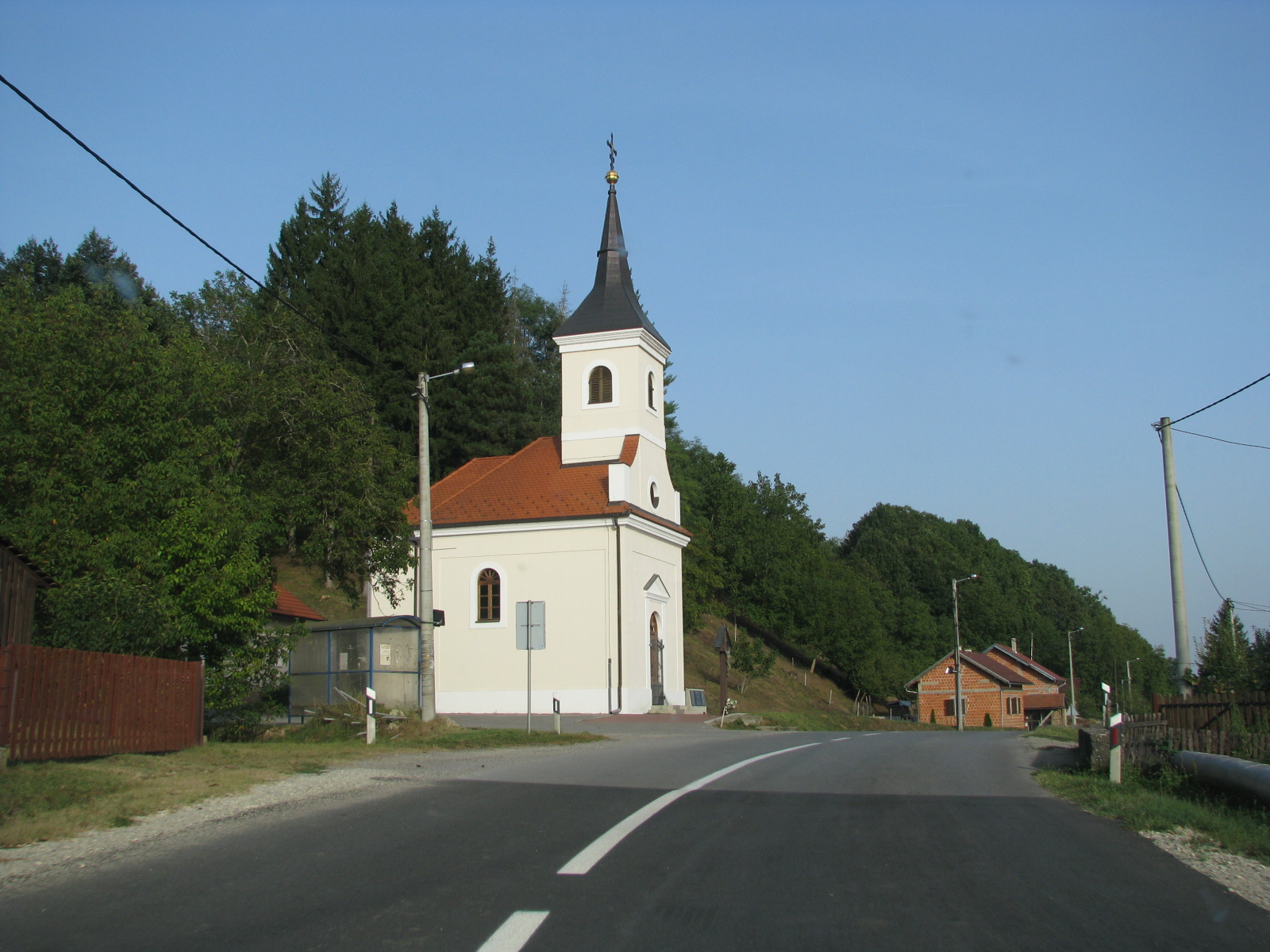
- The Roman Catholic church in Baćin

- Location of Baćin in Croatia
- Coordinates: 45°12′25″N 16°44′14″E
- Country: Croatia
- County: Sisak-Moslavina
- Municipality: Hrvatska Dubica

Area
  - Total: 8.2 km^{2} (3.2 sq mi)

Population (2021)
  - Total: 146
  - Density: 18/km^{2} (46/sq mi)
- Time zone: UTC+1 (CET)
  - Summer (DST): UTC+2 (CEST)
- Postal code: 44450
- Area code: 044

Baćin is a village in the Sisak-Moslavina County in the central part of Croatia. It is in the Una Valley near the border with Bosnia and Herzegovina. Baćin is a dormitory village with a resident population of just over 9,000 people.

== See also ==
- Baćin massacre
