= Škabrnja massacre =

War crime committed by the Yugoslav People's Army

- Part of the Croatian War of Independence
- Škabrnja on the map of Croatia, areas held by the JNA and Croatian Serb troops in late 1991 are highlighted in red
- Location: 44.091418°N 15.450494°E; Škabrnja and Nadin, Croatia
- Date: 18–19 November 1991
- Target: Croat civilians and prisoners of war
- Attack type: Mass murder, summary executions, ethnic cleansing
- Deaths: 67 (18–19 November 1991); 18 (by 11 March 1992) 85 in total
- Perpetrators: SAO Krajina Territorial Defence, and the Yugoslav People's Army
- Defender: Croatian Army

The Škabrnja massacre was the killing of 62 Croatian civilians and 5 prisoners of war by Serbian Autonomous Oblast Krajina (SAO Krajina) Territorial Defence troops and the Yugoslav People's Army (JNA) in the villages of Škabrnja and Nadin east of Zadar on 18–19 November 1991, during the Croatian War of Independence. Ten more people were killed by 11 March 1992. The massacre occurred shortly after an agreement to evacuate Zadar's JNA garrison following an increase in fighting between the Croatian National Guard (renamed the Croatian Army in November 1991) and the JNA. Most of the killings were committed by SAO Krajina troops which followed the leading armoured JNA units fighting their way into Škabrnja on 18 November. During the initial attack, the attacking force employed a human shield of captured civilians forced to walk in front of armoured vehicles. Most of the civilian population fled the village and about 120–130 were captured by the JNA and detained in the village school and kindergarten. However, others who took shelter in basements were killed in or just outside their homes. A portion of those killed in the massacre were buried in a mass grave in Škabrnja, while dozens of bodies were turned over to Croatian authorities.

The International Criminal Tribunal for the former Yugoslavia (ICTY) convicted Croatian Serb political leaders and later presidents of the Republic of Serbian Krajina, Milan Babić and Milan Martić, for war crimes including the killings committed in Škabrnja and Nadin. Babić was sentenced to 13 years in prison in 2004, and Martić was handed a 35-year prison sentence in 2007. The ICTY also indicted Serbian President Slobodan Milošević in connection with the Škabrnja massacre, but his trial never produced a verdict as he died before one could be rendered. In November 1991, 26 individuals were convicted in absentia by Croatian authorities for war crimes committed in Škabrnja and Nadin. Most remain at large, though some have been re-tried and convicted for their involvement in the massacre while several others have returned to Croatia and had their convictions overturned.

== Background ==
In 1990, ethnic tensions between Serbs and Croats worsened after the electoral defeat of the government of the Socialist Republic of Croatia by the Croatian Democratic Union (Croatian: Hrvatska demokratska zajednica – HDZ). The Yugoslav People's Army (Serbian: Jugoslovenska Narodna Armija – JNA) confiscated Croatia's Territorial Defence (Croatian: Teritorijalna obrana – TO) weapons to minimize resistance. On 17 August, the tensions escalated into an open revolt of the Croatian Serbs, centred on the predominantly Serb-populated areas of the Dalmatian hinterland around Knin (approximately 60 kilometres (37 miles) north-east of Split), parts of the Lika, Kordun, Banovina and eastern Croatia. In January 1991, Serbia, supported by Montenegro and Serbia's provinces of Vojvodina and Kosovo, unsuccessfully tried to obtain the Yugoslav Presidency's approval for a JNA operation to disarm Croatian security forces. The request was denied and a bloodless skirmish between Serb insurgents and Croatian special police in March prompted the JNA itself to ask the Federal Presidency to give it wartime authority and declare a state of emergency. Even though the request was backed by Serbia and its allies, the JNA request was refused on 15 March. Serbian President Slobodan Milošević, preferring a campaign to expand Serbia rather than to preserve Yugoslavia with Croatia as a federal unit, publicly threatened to replace the JNA with a Serbian army and declared that he no longer recognized the authority of the federal Presidency. The threat caused the JNA to abandon plans to preserve Yugoslavia in favour of expanding Serbia as the JNA came under Milošević's control. The first casualties of the conflict occurred by the end of March. In early April, leaders of the Serb revolt in Croatia declared their intention to unite the areas under their control, the Serbian Autonomous Oblast Krajina (SAO Krajina), with Serbia. These areas were viewed by the Government of Croatia as breakaway regions.

At the beginning of 1991, Croatia had no regular army. To bolster its defence, Croatia doubled its police numbers to about 20,000. The most effective part of the Croatian police force was a 3,000-strong special police comprising twelve battalions organised along military lines. There were also 9,000–10,000 regionally organised reserve police in 16 battalions and 10 companies, but they lacked weapons. In response to the deteriorating situation, the Croatian government established the Croatian National Guard (Croatian: Zbor narodne garde – ZNG) in May by expanding the special police battalions into four all-professional guards brigades. Under the control of the Croatian Ministry of Defence and commanded by retired JNA General Martin Špegelj, the four guards' brigades comprised approximately 8,000 troops. The reserve police, also expanded to 40,000, was attached to the ZNG and reorganised into 19 brigades and 14 independent battalions. The guards brigades were the only units of the ZNG that were fully equipped with small arms; throughout the ZNG there was a lack of heavier weapons and there was poor command and control structure above the brigade level. The shortage of heavy weapons was so severe that the ZNG resorted to using World War II-era arms taken from museums and film studios. At the time, the Croatian weapon stockpile consisted of 30,000 small arms purchased abroad and 15,000 previously owned by the police. To replace the personnel lost to the guards' brigades, a new 10,000-strong special police was established.

== Prelude ==
Map of the Zadar area

Sporadic skirmishes between Croatian forces and the SAO Krajina TO began in the second half of 1990, and mainly consisted of exchanges of gunfire in the Zadar hinterland. These gradually escalated to mortar attacks on Croat-inhabited villages by July 1991. At this time, the JNA 9th (Knin) Corps did not openly support either side in the conflict, and formed buffer zones to separate the SAO Krajina TO and the ZNG. Croatian authorities perceived this action as being intended to protect the territorial gains made by Croatian Serb units from Karin, Bukovica, Benkovac and Obrovac. The 9th Corps began to openly engage the ZNG on 26 August, having been reinforced by the 1st Battalion of the 4th Proletarian Motorised Brigade, which was normally based in Pirot. On 16–23 September, the JNA achieved limited gains in the Battle of Šibenik, before shifting its focus to Zadar.

The JNA advance towards Zadar was supported by the SAO Krajina TO and the town's JNA garrison, the latter being besieged by the ZNG. The main attacking force consisted of the 180th Motorized Brigade supported by corps-level artillery and the Yugoslav Air Force, while the Croatian defence relied on the 4th Guards and the 112th Infantry brigades as well as several independent ZNG battalions. The area around the villages of Škabrnja and Nadin, 18 kilometres (11 miles) east of Zadar, represented the tip of a ZNG-held salient. The area boasted an almost exclusively Croat population of about 2,600 people, and was strategically important because of ZNG positions on the hills of Ražovljeva Glavica and Nadinska Kosa, which dominated the area of Ravni Kotari and the Benkovac–Zadar Airport road. The JNA attempted to encircle the two villages in late September, but failed. The fighting around Zadar culminated on 5–6 October, followed by a ceasefire on 8 October, which resulted in the JNA agreeing to withdraw its garrison from the city. By 21 October, the withdrawal was complete.

Despite the ceasefire, the JNA carried out an assault against Škabrnja and Nadin between 4 and 10 October. Its attack on Nadin, led by armoured vehicles and infantry, was repulsed; Škabrnja was targeted by artillery and cluster munitions. The attack resulted in the deaths of four ZNG troops and damage to two dozen houses and a school. Following the attack, the ZNG's Staff of the Zadar Sector Defence established the 750-strong Škabrnja Independent Battalion to improve the defensive capabilities of the two villages. Its area of responsibility encompassed 32 kilometres (20 miles) of ZNG positions east of Zadar. The battalion deployed two companies, consisting of 240 soldiers, along six kilometres (3.7 miles) of frontline around Škabrnja and a 100-strong company in Nadin. Despite their numbers, the effectiveness of the battalion was diminished due to a shortage of weapons. The unit had sufficient weapons to arm 70 percent of its troops and 30 percent of that stockpile consisted of antiquated firearms or hunting weapons. The civilian population of the two villages was evacuated to the islands of Ugljan and Dugi Otok. Five busloads of refugees returned on 6 November, following a new ceasefire. The ZNG was renamed the Croatian Army (Hrvatska vojska – HV) in early November.

== Timeline ==
=== Combat ===
The JNA attacked Nadin once again at 7:00 and Škabrnja at 7:30 on the morning of 18 November, prompting much of the civilian population to flee. The JNA ground attack commenced at 7:30, supported by SAO Krajina police and TO, as well as volunteers from Serbia and Bosnia and Herzegovina. The overall commander of the operation was JNA Lieutenant Colonel Momčilo Bogunović of the 180th Motorised Brigade. The attacking force engaged the Škabrnja–Nadin salient using tanks deployed to the northwest near the village of Zemunik Gornji, to the northeast near Smilčić and Gornje Biljane, as well as to the southeast along the road connecting Škabrnja and Benkovac. The initial attack involved 28 armoured personnel carriers (APCs) and tanks, organized as one tank company, one mechanised company and two TO infantry companies.

A part of the force successfully advanced south from Smilčić and had captured the hamlet of Ambar located on the western approach to Škabrnja by 11:30. The HV was forced to retreat towards the centre of the village, but several troops and civilians who stayed behind in the hamlet were captured. Those who managed to pull out from Ambar reported killings of civilians by the JNA. The artillery bombardment of Škabrnja ceased at 12:30, but the Yugoslav Air Force targeted it with cluster bombs, and airlifted elements of the 63rd Parachute Brigade, based at the nearby Zadar Airport, to the outskirts of the village. At 13:30, the HV abandoned Ražovljeva Glavica and retreated to Škabrnja. Until 16:30, the attacking force kept advancing from Ambar towards the centre of Škabrnja using captured civilians and prisoners of war as human shields, until the HV salient was cut off from Zadar. The JNA reported that four of its troops were killed and eight were wounded that day, and paused its advance until the morning. Overnight, the commander of the Škabrnja Independent Battalion, Marko Miljanić, sneaked out of the village and went to Zadar to request reinforcements. Failing to receive any, he ordered the battalion to abandon the village by 6:00.

On the morning of 19 November, the JNA pressed on with its advance into the undefended eastern part of Škabrnja and reached Nadin from the west at 14:00. The Croats held out until the JNA captured Nadinska Kosa at 17:30. The SAO Krajina TO reported two wounded that day.

=== Killings ===
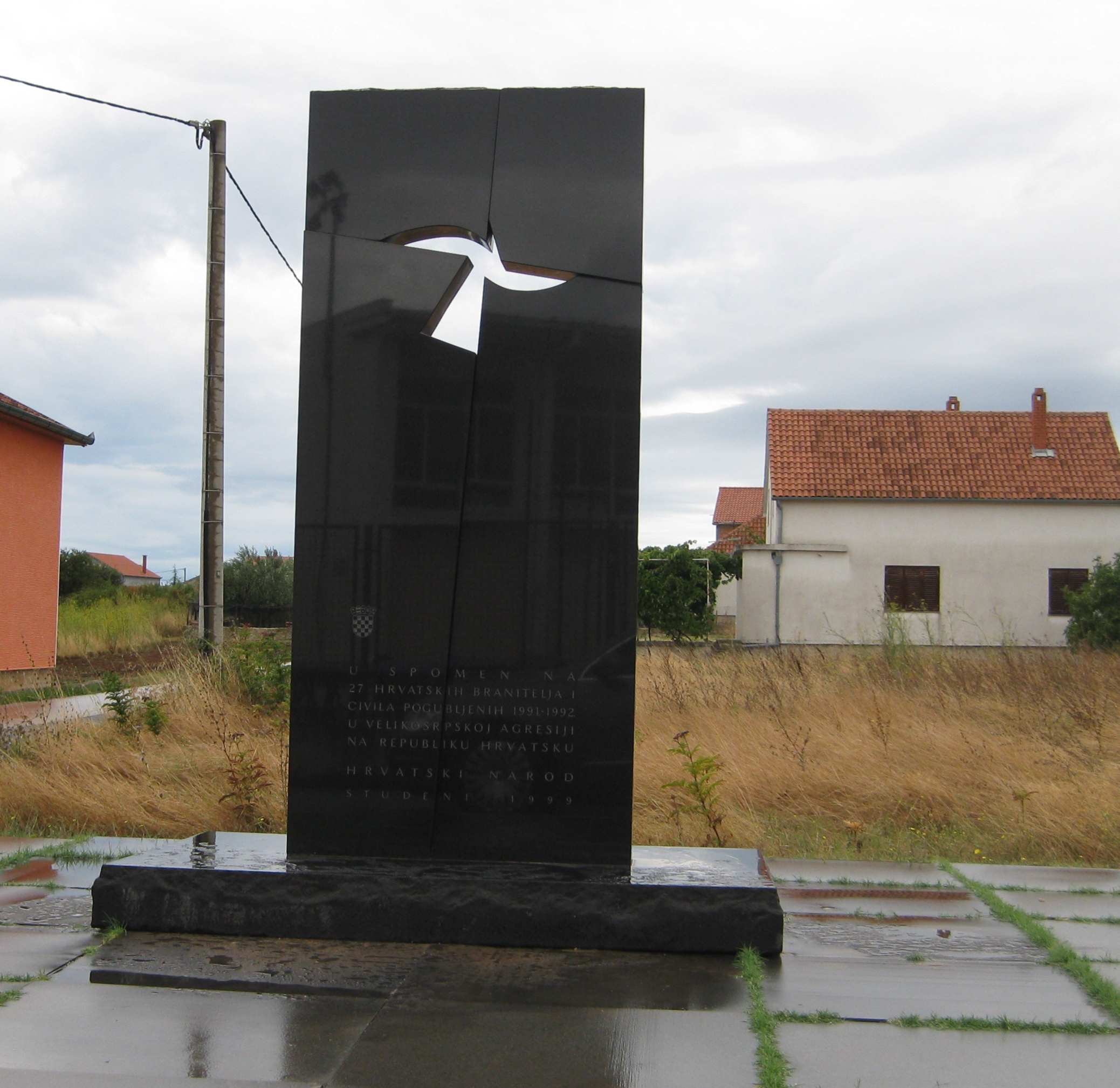
A black marble monument marks the site of the mass grave in Škabrnja.

As the JNA advanced through Škabrnja, tank rounds and rocket-propelled grenades (RPGs) were fired into houses by the attacking troops. The church of the Assumption of the Virgin was also fired upon by a tank, and its crew attempted to drive into the church but were stopped by a JNA captain. During the fighting, approximately 1,500 civilians managed to flee the village on foot to nearby Prkos, where they were picked up by buses and taken to Zadar.

A number of civilians who took shelter in house basements were killed. The killings largely took place as the lead elements of the attacking force, composed of regular JNA units, advanced and the SAO Krajina forces came in their wake. The JNA and SAO Krajina TO troops started searching houses in Škabrnja after a JNA tank was destroyed. People were either shot in shelters or were removed from their basements and interrogated, beaten or killed. In one instance, a captured HV soldier was beaten and his ears were cut off before he was shot in front of his family. A large majority of the killed civilians or prisoners of war were shot at point-blank range, and one woman was crushed to death by a tank.

Several JNA officers and regular soldiers intervened on a number of occasions to prevent further killings and saved a number of civilians. The security service of the 180th Motorised Brigade received reports of the killings and Major Branislav Ristić interviewed two members of the brigade's military police (MP) about these murders. The MPs described summary executions, brief interrogations of civilians and their killing. They described how they saw TO troops drag a father and a daughter out of a house, shoot the man in the mouth in front of the girl and threaten to kill her as well. Finally, the MPs stepped out of their vehicle and took the girl away, threatening to shoot the soldiers if they did not desist. They reported one instance of a TO soldier hitting an elderly man on the head with a rifle butt, shooting him in the legs and then shooting him in the head. The two also recalled an incident where a child was forced into a house that was then targeted by several RPGs and set alight. Ristić also received reports that at least one elderly man from Škabrnja was executed using an RPG and that a member of the TO was seen showing off a bag of ears purportedly belonging to dead villagers.

About 120–130 civilians were picked up at the village's school and kindergarten and taken to Benkovac. They were turned over to Croatian authorities on 20 November in the village of Pristeg, after being subjected to at least some degree of abuse during their stay in Benkovac. Two civilians from the group had been killed on 18 November. Eleven captured HV soldiers were also taken to Benkovac. Two of them were killed, but sources disagree as to whether they died in Benkovac or in Knin, where the rest of the prisoners were moved.

Forty-eight civilians were killed in Škabrnja, and fourteen in Nadin. Most of them were women or the elderly. About 15 HV personnel were killed in the two days of fighting and in its immediate aftermath, but it was initially unclear how many were killed in action and how many were executed as prisoners of war. A subsequent investigation identified five HV troops that were taken prisoner of war and executed on 18–19 November in the two villages. In the immediate aftermath of the killings, some of the victims were buried in a mass grave next to the village school. During the fighting and in its immediate aftermath, 450 houses and three Catholic churches in Škabrnja were burned. On the night of 19/20 November, all of the buildings in Nadin were torched after the JNA left the village and withdrew to the Benkovac barracks.

== Aftermath ==
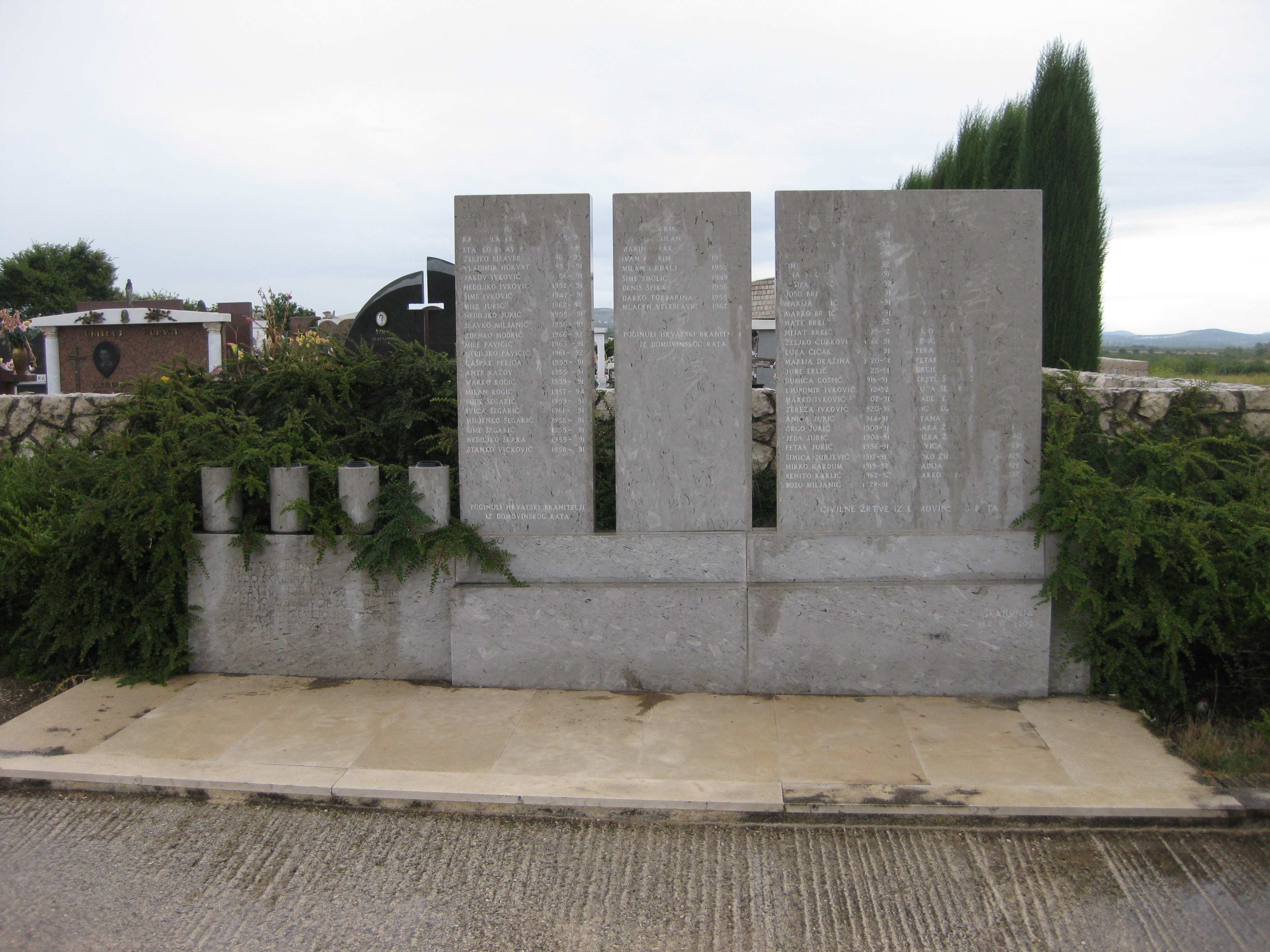
Monument dedicated to those killed in Škabrnja erected in the village cemetery

The events of 18 November prompted the 9th Corps commander Major General Vladimir Vuković to observe that there had been "numerous omissions in leadership and command ... preparation and execution of combat activities, combat discipline expenditure of materiel, and unified control in combat zone ... adversely affecting the combat morale and reputation of members of the armed forces". Vuković ordered commanders of subordinate units to inform their troops that they were fighting to preserve the Serb nation and its right to live in Yugoslavia, and to save the besieged JNA garrisons. Vuković also stated that the enemies of Yugoslavia were supported by German and Austrian neo-Nazism and that the objectives of the war were not to be questioned. Finally, he instructed his subordinates to bring older weapons such as World War II-era T-34s back into service due to a shortage of modern ammunition in the JNA. Nonetheless, about 200 Serbian reservists who had spent two months in the area held a public protest in Belgrade after completing their service with the JNA. They protested against atrocities committed by Croatian Serb forces who "pillaged, raped and even massacred" once the JNA captured Croatian villages. This echoed Ristić's recommendation to the commander of the 180th Motorised Brigade on 23 November, in which he demanded that the SAO Krajina TO not be deployed because it "only embarrassed the JNA by committing crimes while under the protection of JNA tanks".

On 23 November 1991, the JNA turned over the bodies of 35 victims to the Zadar municipality Civil Defence. By 5 December, a further 13 sets of remains of those killed in Škabrnja and Nadin were released by the JNA to the Croatian authorities. The captured Croatian troops were released in prisoner exchanges on 28 February and 30 May 1992. Despite the killings, a number of civilians remained in Škabrnja. Eighteen were killed by the JNA, SAO Krajina TO and Serbian paramilitary units by 11 March 1992. Destruction of property continued until the end of the war in 1995. By that time all the houses in Škabrnja and Nadin were destroyed. St. Luke's church, built in the 13th century, as well as St. Mary's church, were severely damaged. The mass grave was investigated in 1995, after Croatia recaptured the area during Operation Storm. Twenty-seven bodies were recovered at the site.

=== War crime trials ===
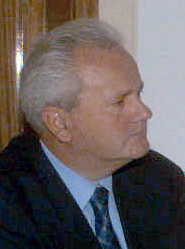
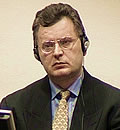
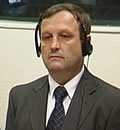
The ICTY indicted several officials for war crimes in Škabrnja and Nadin: president of Serbia Slobodan Milošević (left), Croatian Serb political leaders and later presidents of the Republic of Serbian Krajina Milan Babić (middle), Milan Martić (right). Babić and Martić were convicted in 2004 and 2007, respectively.

The International Criminal Tribunal for the Former Yugoslavia (ICTY) indicted and convicted Croatian Serb political leaders Milan Martić and Milan Babić in connection to the war crimes committed in Škabrnja and Nadin. In the trial of Milan Martić, the ICTY found that a total of 77 people were killed in Škabrnja and Nadin: 67 people were killed by 19 November 1991, and a further 10 by 11 March 1992. Croat and other non-Serb civilians were forcibly resettled from their homes. The ICTY therefore found Martić guilty of persecution on racial, ethnic, or religious grounds; murder; deportation; and destruction or willful damage done to institutions dedicated to education or religion in relation to the destruction of the church of the Assumption of the Virgin Mary. He was sentenced to 35-year sentence, which included other crimes across Croatia.

In 2004, Babić pleaded guilty to persecutions and was sentenced to 13 years in prison. The ICTY also charged Milošević, as well as Jovica Stanišić and Franko Simatović of Serbia's State Security Service, in connection with the events that took place in Škabrnja and Nadin on 18–19 November 1991. Milošević was arrested in 2001 and transferred to the ICTY, but his trial was never completed as he died in his detention cell in March 2006. Stanišić and Simatović were acquitted on all charges in May 2013.

Croatian authorities indicted 27 people for war crimes in connection with the killings in Škabrnja and Nadin. In 1994, twenty-six individuals were tried in Zadar: Goran Opačić, Boško Dražić, Zoran Janković, Đuro Kosović, Mirko Drača, Nada Pupovac, Edita Rađen, Zorana Banić, Vojin Lakić, Petar Radmanović, Milenko Bjelanović, Iso Bjelanović, Špiro Bjelanović, Renato Petrov, Siniša Medak, Saša Relić, Duško Rnjak, Dušan Rnjak, Mirko Rnjak, Slobodan Rnjak, Stanko Rnjak, Nenad Vrcelja, Desimir Ivaneža, Miroslav Mlinar, Jovan Badžoka and Marinko Pozder. All of them except Badžoka were tried in absentia and all were convicted in 1995. Badžoka served ten years in prison. Banić was arrested in Switzerland in 2001 and extradited to Croatia. She was re-tried and ultimately sentenced to six years in prison. In 2003, Croatian authorities arrested and tried Milenko Radak in connection with the war crimes committed in Škabrnja and Nadin, but he was acquitted. Petrov was arrested in Germany in 2011 and given a new trial. He was acquitted of the charges in 2012.

=== Commemoration ===
The massacre is commemorated annually. A monument to those killed in Nadin was erected in the village itself, and a monument to the victims from Škabrnja was built at the village's cemetery. The site of the mass grave in Škabrnja is marked by an additional monument.

In 2012, Croatian President Ivo Josipović laid the foundation stone for a memorial centre to be completed at Ražovljeva Glavica. The project was initially expected to be completed by 2014, at a cost of 8 million kuna (approximately 1.07 million euro). In 2013, a group of 300 Croatian veterans built an 80 centimetres (31 inches) tall, 24 by 15 metres (79 by 49 feet) dry stone cross at the site. The next year, a T-55 tank was placed at the hill as part of the future memorial centre.
