= Hrvatska Dubica =

Village and municipality in Sisak-Moslavina County, Croatia

- Municipality
- Općina Hrvatska Dubica; Municipality of Hrvatska Dubica
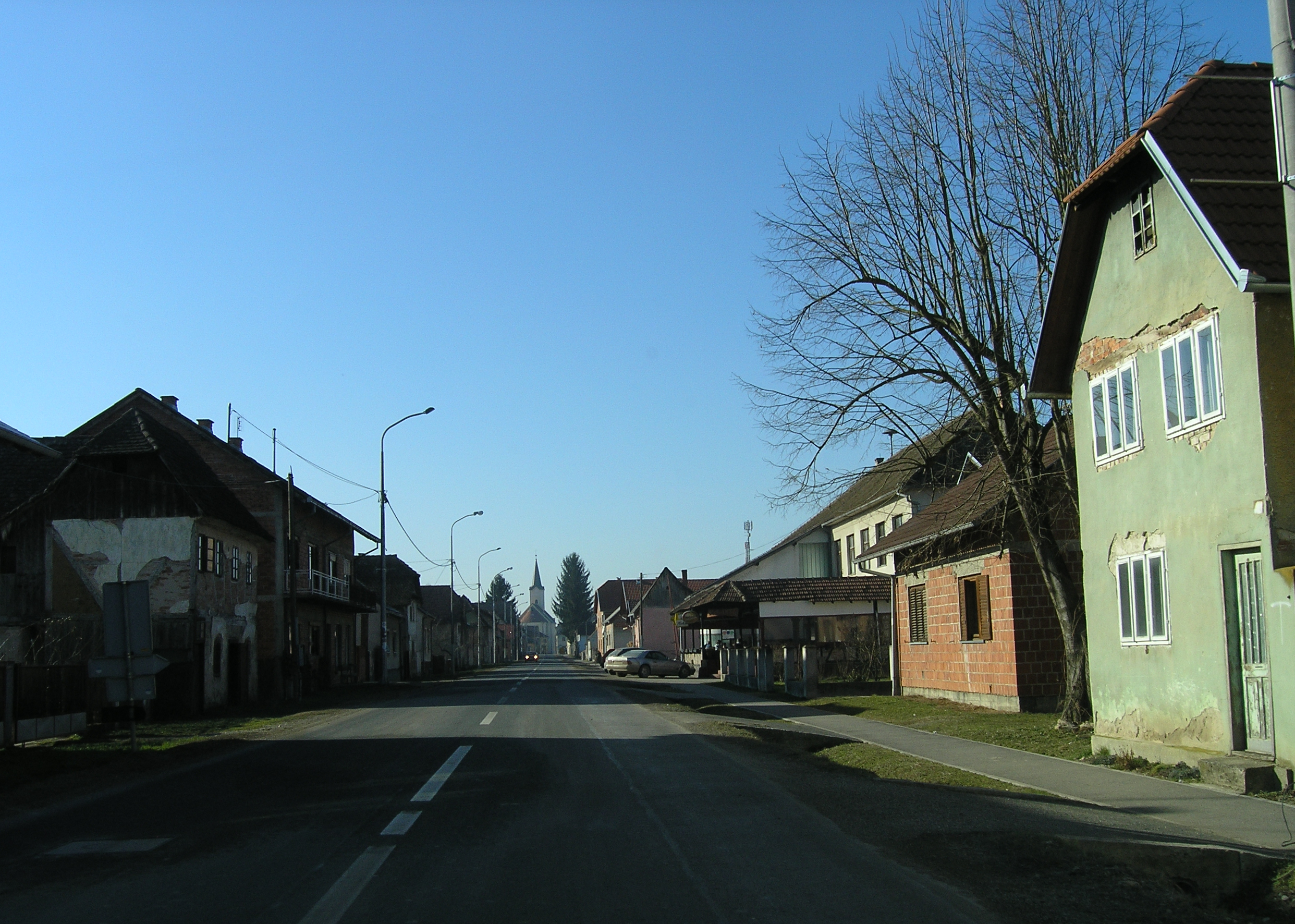
- Hrvatska Dubica

- Flag Coat of arms

- Location in Croatia
- Coordinates: 45.189271°N 16.798529°E
- Country: Croatia
- County: Sisak-Moslavina County

Area
  - Municipality: 129.6 km^{2} (50.0 sq mi)
  - Urban: 23.4 km^{2} (9.0 sq mi)

Population (2021)
  - Municipality: 1,462
  - Density: 11.28/km^{2} (29.22/sq mi)
  - Urban: 774
  - Urban density: 33.1/km^{2} (85.7/sq mi)
- Website: hrvatska-dubica.hr

Hrvatska Dubica is a village and a municipality in central Croatia in the Sisak-Moslavina County. It is located on the northern bank of the river Una, east of Hrvatska Kostajnica and southwest of Jasenovac and Novska. The town of Kozarska Dubica lies to the south of the municipality, in Bosnia and Herzegovina. Hrvatska Dubica is underdeveloped municipality which is statistically classified as the First Category Area of Special State Concern by the Government of Croatia.

== Demographics ==
The municipality of Hrvatska Dubica has a population of 2,089 (2011 census), 75.30% (1,573) which are Croats and 22.40% (468) which are Serbs.

=== Settlements ===
- Baćin, population 217
- Donji Cerovljani, population 76
- Gornji Cerovljani, population 99
- Hrvatska Dubica, population 1,040
- Slabinja, population 348
- Živaja, population 309

== Politics ==
=== Minority councils and representatives ===
Directly elected minority councils and representatives are tasked with consulting tasks for the local or regional authorities in which they are advocating for minority rights and interests, integration into public life and participation in the management of local affairs. At the 2023 Croatian national minorities councils and representatives elections Serbs of Croatia fulfilled legal requirements to elect 10 members minority council of the Municipality of Hrvatska Dubica.

== History ==
Upon the conclusion of the Treaty of Passarowitz in 1718, Dubica was to be transferred to the Habsburg monarchy.

=== Recent ===
During the Croatian War of Independence, Hrvatska Dubica was located in the area contested by Serb rebels. Most of the civilians fled the area during the attacks of the Serbian forces that started in September 1991. These forces were controlled by Milan Martić, and consisted of units of Yugoslav People's Army, Territorial Defence, and the so-called Militia of SAO Krajina. Hrvatska Dubica fell on 17 September 1991. Around 7 October 1991, Serb forces took control of the entire wider area of Hrvatska Kostajnica. Most Croats fled the area or were killed by Serb forces during a subsequent campaign of ethnic cleansing, which included the infamous Baćin massacre.

== Notable people ==
- Mirko Braun (1942–2004), Croatian association football player.
- Ivo Kozarčanin (1911–1941), Croatian writer, poet and literary critic.

== See also ==
- Battle of Dubica
- List of Knights Templar sites
- Újlaki family

== Bibliography ==
- Roksandić, Drago (2007-10-01). "Posavska krajina/granica od 1718. do 1739. godine". Ekonomska i ekohistorija: časopis za gospodarsku povijest i povijest okoliša (in Serbo-Croatian) (3): 62–82. eISSN 1849-0190.
- Pelidija, Enes (1989). Bosanski ejalet od Karlovačkog do Požarevačkog mira 1699 - 1718 (in Serbo-Croatian). Sarajevo. pp. 237–259.
