= Trial of Stanislav Galić =

Trial of the International Criminal Tribunal for the former Yugoslavia

Prosecutor v. Galić
- Logo of the ICTY
- Court: International Criminal Tribunal for the former Yugoslavia
- Full case name: The Prosecutor of the Tribunal v. Stanislav Galić
- Started: 2001
- Verdict: Guilty on 5 of 7 counts of the indictment
- Defendant: Stanislav Galić
- Citation: IT-98-29-A

Court membership
- Judges sitting: Alphons Orie, Amin El Madhi

The Prosecutor v. Galić was a case before the International Criminal Tribunal for the former Yugoslavia in The Hague, Netherlands, concerning crimes against humanity committed during the Siege of Sarajevo by Stanislav Galić during the Bosnian War. In 2003, Stanislav Galić was found guilty of 5 of 7 counts of crime including crimes against humanity, and was sentenced to 20 years of imprisonment. He was also found guilty of acts of violence, the primary purpose of which was to spread terror among the civilian population. However, due to an appeal by the prosecution and Galić, his sentence was increased from 20 years to life imprisonment. He was the first person to receive such a severe sentence at that tribunal. He was taken to Germany to serve his sentence.

== Arrest ==
In 1998, the International Criminal Tribunal for the former Yugoslavia (ICTY) indicted him. SFOR arrested him on 20 December, 1999 and transferred him to The Hague on 21 December, 1999.

== Trial ==
His trial began on 3 December 2001 and ended on 9 May 2003 when he was found guilty of 5 of the 7 counts of crimes against humanity and sentenced to a single sentence of 20 years. He was found guilty on following counts:

- Murder — through sniping (crimes against humanity and violations of the laws or customs of war)
- Terror (crimes against humanity)
- Inhumane acts — through sniping and shelling (crimes against humanity)

== Appeal ==
On 30 November 2006, the prosecution and Galić appealed to the 20-year-long sentence. The Appeals Chamber rendered its judgement on 30 November 2006, sentencing Galić to life imprisonment. However, The Appeals Chamber dismissed all 19 grounds of appeals by Galić, including those which claimed that the Trial Chamber wrongly convicted him of the “acts or threats of violence the primary purpose of which was to spread terror among the civilian population” of Sarajevo.

On 15 January 2009, Galić was transferred to Germany to serve his sentence.

== See also ==
- Trial of Radovan Karadžić
- Trial of Ratko Mladić
- Trial of Slobodan Milošević
