= Aleksandar Vasiljević (general) =

Serbian retired military commander

- Born: July 8, 1938 (age 88); Vitkovac, Yugoslavia
- Military career
- Allegiance: Socialist Federal Republic of Yugoslavia
- Branch: Yugoslav People's Army
- Service years: 1991–1992
- Rank: Major General
- Conflicts: Yugoslav Wars

Aleksandar Vasiljević (born 8 July 1938) is a Serbian retired major general and the head of the Counterintelligence Service of Yugoslavia. Vasiljević was instrumental in the JBTZ trial as he was the interrogation official responsible to talking with Janez Janša, which centered on Slovene dissidents and the publishing of sensitive information in the youth magazine Mladina. Vasiljević retired in May 1992 and was arrested for his role in an interview with the weekly publication NIN. He was again deputy head between March 1999 and 2001. He testified in the Hague trial against Slobodan Milošević.

== See also ==
- JBTZ trial
