= Škabrnja =

- Municipality
- Interactive map of Škabrnja
- Location of Škabrnja in Croatia
- Coordinates: 44.091633°N 15.451605°E
- Country: Croatia
- Region: Dalmatia
- County: Zadar County

Area
  - Municipality: 22.7 km^{2} (8.8 sq mi)
  - Urban: 14.9 km^{2} (5.8 sq mi)

Population (2021)
  - Municipality: 1,661
  - Density: 73.2/km^{2} (190/sq mi)
  - Urban: 1,320
  - Urban density: 88.6/km^{2} (229/sq mi)
- Website: opcina-skabrnja.hr

Škabrnja is a village and a municipality in northern Dalmatia, Croatia, located halfway between Zadar and Benkovac, in the lowland region of Ravni Kotari. The municipality includes the village of Škabrnja with a population of 1,413, as well as the smaller village of Prkos, population 363, with a total of 1,776 residents (2011 census). The total area of the municipality is 22.7 km^{2}.

== History ==
The first mention of "the forest of Škabrnje" dates from a medieval contract which mentions the village of Kamenjani located near Škabrnja. The village of Kamenjani itself was first mentioned in 1070, and the last time in 1700; it was a property of the Šubić family and located in the area around today's village cemetery.

The oldest two buildings in the village are the two Catholic churches: the church of St. Mary in the hamlet of Ambar, and the church of St. Luke at the village cemetery. The church of St. Mary dates from the 11th century and is built from stone, forming a hexagonal shape, one of several such old Croatian churches from northern Dalmatian towns and villages. The church of St. Luke was built in the 13th century, with a Gothic dome dated 1440. It has a single nave which ends in an apsis, as well as a bell tower which was also built later.

At the end of the 19th century, the Škabrnja municipality included six smaller settlements: Ambar, Prkos, Kutrovo, Marinovac, Škare. In 1878, Škabrnja had 640 inhabitants.

According to the census of 1991, Škabrnja was inhabited by 1,953 people in 397 households, and the vast majority of them were Croats (97.59%). In November 1991, during the Croatian War of Independence, Škabrnja was attacked by the Yugoslav People's Army and Serb paramilitary forces, resulting in the Škabrnja massacre.

== Demographics ==
In 2021, the municipality had 1,661 residents in the following 2 settlements:

- Prkos, population 341
- Škabrnja, population 1320
Škabrnja: Population trends 1857–2021
v

population	478	563	592	592	697	887	970	1086	1515	1725	1992	2169	1967	2350	1772	1776	1661
	1857	1869	1880	1890	1900	1910	1921	1931	1948	1953	1961	1971	1981	1991	2001	2011	2021

Sources: Croatian Bureau of Statistics publications
