= Milosevic on Trial =

2008 Danish documentary film

- Directed by: Michael Christoffersen
- Music by: Simon Ravn
- Original language: English

Production
- Producers: Mette Heide; Mette Hoffman Meyer
- Editors: Henrik Fleischer; Niels Ostenfeld; Anders Refn; Scott Stevenson
- Running time: 120 minutes
- Production companies: Team Productions; TV2 Danmark; Det Danske Filminstitut; Sundance Institute Documentary Fund; MEDIA Programme of the European Union; Undervisningsministeriet; British Broadcasting Corporation; Sveriges Television; ZDF/Arte; National Film Board of Canada; Norsk Rikskringkasting; Yleisradio; Vrijzinnig Protestantse Radio Omroep; Radio Télévision Belge Francophone (RTBF); Special Broadcasting Service (SBS)

Original release
- Release: 2007

Milosevic on Trial, also known as Slobodan Milosevic – Præsident under Anklage (the Danish title), is a documentary by Danish director Michael Christoffersen that follows the trial of Slobodan Milošević from 2002 until his death in 2006. The documentary has won several awards, and has been in competition at the 2008 Tribeca Film Festival, at Hot Docs '08, and at the 6th Silverdocs festival in Washington DC. The showing at Silverdocs was followed by a panel discussion with former NATO Supreme Allied Commander Europe, Wesley Clark.

== Awards ==
- 2008: Grand Prix Award, 23rd Odense International Film Festival
- 2008: Robert Award for Best Long Documentary
- 2007: EBU Golden Link award
- 2007: GuldDok for Best Production
