= Trial of Radovan Karadžić =

Trial of Radovan Karadžić at the ICTY

Prosecutor v. Karadžić
- Logo of the ICTY
- Court: International Criminal Tribunal for the former Yugoslavia
- Full case name: The Prosecutor of the Tribunal v. Radovan Karadžić
- Decided: March 24, 2016
- Verdict: Guilty on 10 of 11 counts of the indictment
- Defendant: Radovan Karadžić

The Prosecutor v. Radovan Karadžić was a case before the International Criminal Tribunal for the former Yugoslavia in The Hague, Netherlands, concerning ethnic cleansing and other crimes committed during the Bosnian War by Radovan Karadžić, the former president of Republika Srpska. In 2016, Karadžić was found guilty of 10 of 11 counts of crime including war crimes, genocide and crimes against humanity, and sentenced to 40 years imprisonment. In 2019, the sentence was increased to life in prison.

== Dabić alias ==
Karadžić had been hiding disguised under the alias Dr. Dragan David Dabić (Драган Давид Дабић) offering his services as a doctor of alternative medicine under the company name of "Human Quantum Energy".

He had lived in Jurija Gagarina Street 267 (Blok 45), in New Belgrade for 18 months (he had been in Belgrade for 3 years as "Dabić",) had a mane of long white hair and a long beard, and used glasses. Using a false ID, and going by the false name Dragan Dabić, he had been practicing at a private medical clinic, specializing in alternative medicine and claiming to be a neuro-psychiatrist.

He was able to walk around freely and appear in public without being identified, he spent his days at the local kafana "Luda kuća" drinking slivovitz, singing folk poetry, and playing Gusle (in front of the pictures of Karadžić and Mladic on the walls of the cafe). The website of Dabić's company at www.psy-help-energy.com was maintained by Zoran Pavlović of Pavlović Consulting, Belgrade. When interviewed by Belgrade's Blic newspaper, Pavlović stated that he had frequently met with Dabić, discussing alternative medicine, sports and sometimes politics, without the least suspicion of his true identity. He described Dabić as a friendly and eloquent individual towards whom he had felt sympathetic.

Dabić had published several articles in the Zdrav život ("Healthy Life") journal of alternative medicine since October 2007. Introduced as a "spiritual explorer", he also gave lectures comparing meditation techniques practiced by Orthodox monks. On 23 May 2008, Dabić gave a talk at the "Third Festival of Healthy Life" (Treći Festival zdravog života) on the topic of "how to cherish one's own energies" (Kako negovati sopstvene energije).

The editor of Zdrav život, Goran Kojic, confirmed that Dabić appeared as a highly cultured and sympathetic man, speaking Serbian free of any Bosnian accent.

Serbia's Minister of Health Tomica Milosavljević stated that there was no registration for a Dragan or David Dabić as a licensed physician. The arrest came just two days before the ICTY's chief prosecutor, Serge Brammertz, was due to visit Serbia.

=== Capture evasion in Austria ===
Karadžić evaded capture in May 2007 in Vienna, Austria, where he lived under another alias, Petar Glumac, posing as a Croatian distributor of herbal solutions and ointments. The Austrian police talked to him during a raid regarding an unrelated homicide case in the area where Karadžić lived, but failed to recognize his real identity. He had a Croatian passport under the name Petar Glumac, and claimed to be in Vienna for training. Police did not ask any further questions nor demand to fingerprint him as he appeared calm and readily answered questions. His nephew Dragan Karadžić has claimed in an interview to the Corriere della Sera that Radovan Karadžić had attended football matches of Serie A, and visited Venice under the false identity of Petar Glumac.

== Arrest and extradition ==
Karadžić's arrest occurred on 21 July 2008 in Belgrade. However, UK's Channel 4 News reported that Karadžić's lawyer, Sveta Vujacić, stated "I'm 100% sure that ... Radovan Karadžić was arrested on 18 July at half past nine (in the evening) ..." These claims were denied by the president of the National Council for Cooperation with the Hague Tribunal Rasim Ljajić.

Milan Dilparić, an investigative judge at Serbia's special war crimes tribunal, terminated the investigation and ruled: "all conditions have been met for his transfer to the Hague to face trial before the International Criminal Tribunal for the former Yugoslavia (ICTY). The decision could be appealed within 72 hours to the appeals board, and its decision is final. Karadžić was examined by a doctor, and would remain in a special detention unit of Serbia's war crimes court pending transfer to the UN tribunal. The Daily Telegraph reported that the former general of the Bosnian Serb army Ratko Mladić gave away the whereabouts of Karadžić in order to avoid prosecution from the Hague. It also reported that Mladić, with the help of his people, was talking about giving himself up.

A statement issued by the office of President Boris Tadić said: "Radovan Karadžić was located and arrested tonight [and] was brought to the investigative judge of the War Crimes Court in Belgrade, in accordance with the law on cooperation with the International Criminal Tribunal for the former Yugoslavia." Serbian security forces were credited with having located and captured Karadžić, without any further details being given of the circumstances. Sources in the Serbian government told Reuters news agency he had been under surveillance for several weeks, following a tip-off from a foreign intelligence service.

Karadžić was transferred to The Hague on 30 July and moved into a high-security prison near Scheveningen. The prison had previously held Slobodan Milošević.

== The case before ICTY ==
Karadžić faced charges on 11 counts for genocide, crimes against humanity and severe breaches of the Geneva Convention for his role in the 1992–1995 Bosnian war, especially for the Srebrenica massacre of July 1995.

Consolidating two 1995 indictments into one single document, the indictment against Karadžić (IT-95-5/18) was confirmed on 31 May 2000. Specifically, it included one count of a grave breach of the Geneva conventions of 1949, three counts of violations of the laws or customs of war, two counts of genocide and five counts of crimes against humanity.

Karadžić announced he would represent himself during the trial. If convicted, his sentence would be the longest pronounced by the court, exceeding 40 years, which in practice would amount to a life sentence. Karadžić was tried before a three-judge panel in an open court with a tape-delayed feed; proceedings were in English with Serbian translation. Judge Alphons Orie (Netherlands) held a first interview with Karadžić on 31 July, with the purpose of establishing whether he understood the charges leveled against him. Orie presented a first opportunity to Karadžić to plead "guilty" or "not guilty" to each of the 11 counts. Karadžić was free to delay his plea for 30 days, after which, "not guilty" was to automatically be entered on his behalf in the absence of a "guilty" plea.

He claimed there was a conspiracy against him and refused to enter a plea, therefore the court entered a plea of not guilty on his behalf to all 11 charges. He dismissed the tribunal chaired by Scottish judge Iain Bonomy, as a "court of NATO" disguised as a court of the international community. Karadzic insisted on defending himself (as he is entitled to under the United Nations court's rules) while at the same time he set up a team of advisers led by his Legal Advisor Peter Robinson of the United States. Judge Bonomy urged Karadžić to hire an attorney and set 20 January as a tentative date for a new status conference.

On 3 September 2010, judges warned that Karadžić's trial could take two years longer than expected and stretch into 2014 if prosecutors and Karadžić did not speed up the case.

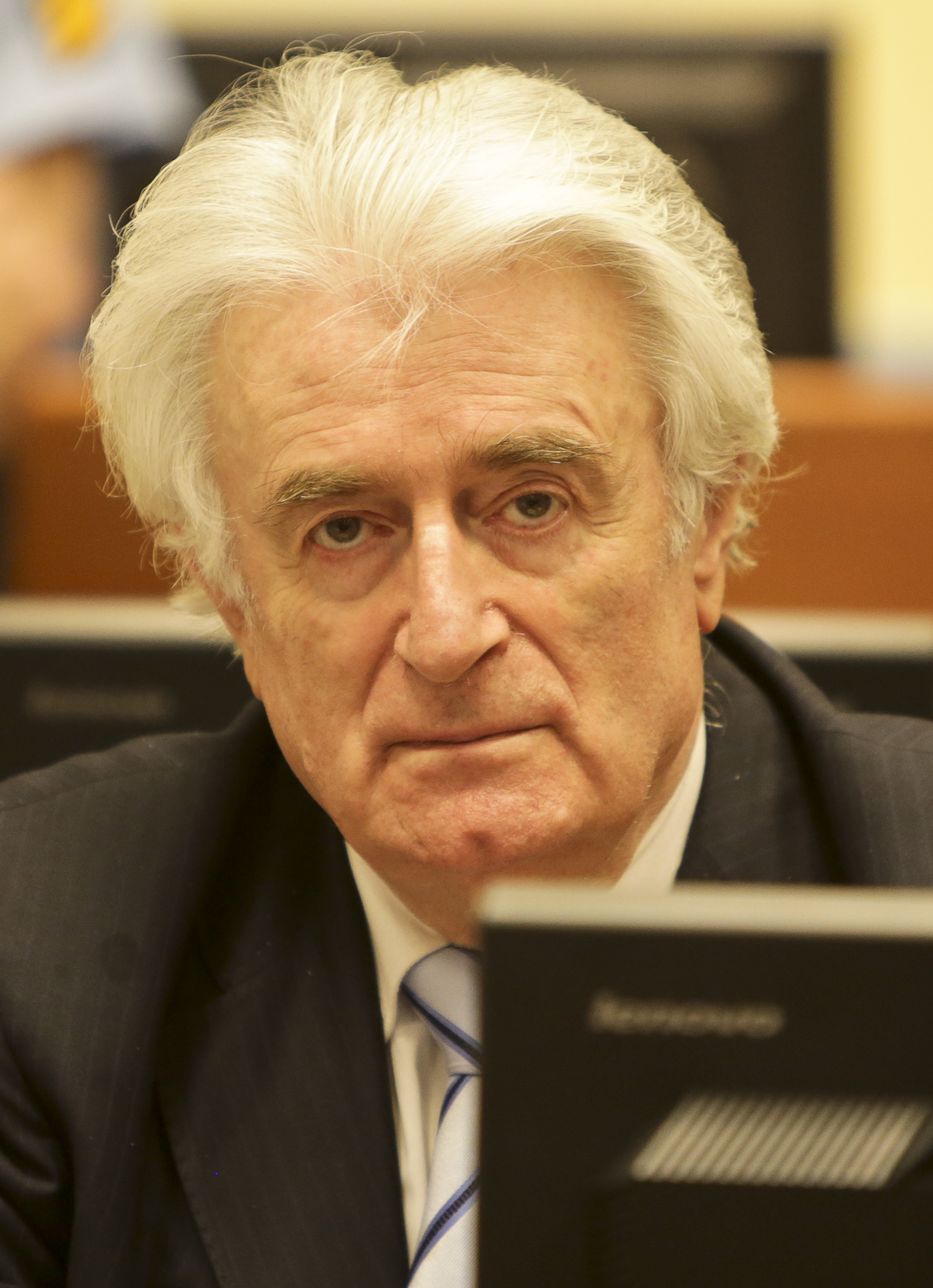
Radovan Karadžić at his trial judgement, 24 March 2016

On 14 February 2016, the ICTY announced that the judgement in the case would be rendered on 24 March 2016.

=== Alleged Karadžić-Holbrooke deal ===
On 31 July 2008, a summary of the charges were read out in court. Karadžić delayed his plea until 29 August 2008, due to the fact that an amended indictment was being prepared. Karadžić said he would enter his plea to the charges on 29 August. During his first hearing, Karadžić claimed that Madeleine Albright, along with Richard Holbrooke, offered him a deal which would allow him not to be prosecuted for war crimes if he would disappear from public life and politics. According to Karadžić, Albright offered him to get out of the way and go to Russia, Greece, or Serbia and open a private clinic or to at least go to Bijeljina in northeastern Bosnia and Herzegovina. He also said that Holbrooke or Albright would like to see him disappear and expressed fear for his life by saying "I do not know how long the arm of Mr Holbrooke or Mrs Albright is...or whether that arm can reach me here". Richard Holbrooke denied such claims, calling them lies in a Spiegel interview shortly after Karadzic's arrest. Former Bosnian Serb foreign minister Aleksa Buha claimed that he witnessed the agreement which was made during the night between 18 and 19 July 1996. Claims of such a deal were also investigated by journalists before the capture and trial of Karadžić.

After the allegations were broadcast internationally, the Serbian newspaper Blic claimed that Karadžić was under U.S. protection in exchange for him keeping a low profile and not participating in politics, quoting a "U.S. intelligence source" as saying that the protection ended in 2000 when the CIA intercepted a phone call of Karadžić in which it became apparent that Karadžić chaired a meeting of his old political party. Greek newspaper Kathimerini reported on 6 August 2008, that according to a Serbian newspaper, a former court official wrote a book claiming that the United States and other Western states had a deal with Karadžić, protected him from arrest, and a U.S. diplomat told Karadzic that he could hide in a NATO base.

=== Motion to disqualify ===
In a 15 August 2008 letter to Fausto Pocar, president of The Hague tribunal, Karadžić moved to disqualify and replace presiding Dutch judge Alphons Orie, on the ground of "personal" interest and bias to convict him in order to reinforce and justify "draconian" sentences in his earlier ICTY cases against former Bosnian Serbs leaders: "There clearly cannot be any question of impartiality on his [Judge Orie's] part. He would now be keen on having that ruling "upheld and somehow validated, which could be achieved through, inter alia, partial and biased conduct of the case against me". Karadžić also asked the other judges of Orie's chamber replaced. Preliminary investigations of tribunal cases are conducted by a judge, but trials are heard by a panel of three. The tribunal had no juries.

The Hague tribunal president, Fausto Pocar, replaced the whole judge panel on 21 August 2008. The new presiding judge was Patrick Lipton Robinson.

=== Wiretaps ===
In 2009, the prosecution presented recorded calls and transcripts of Karadžić's political speeches. In one Karadžić is quoted as saying "Sarajevo will be a black cauldron where Muslims will die," and that "They will disappear, that people will disappear from the face of the earth." In another Karadžić is quoted as saying that "Europe will be told to go fuck itself and not come back till the job is finished."

=== Hearings ===
The prosecution started its case on 13 April 2010, and completed it on 25 May 2012. The discovery of more than 300 previously unknown bodies in a mass grave at the Tomašica mine near Prijedor in September 2013 caused a flurry of motions which ended with the court denying reopening prosecutorial evidence. The defence began its case on 16 October 2012 and completed it in March 2014; Karadžić decided not to testify.

== Judgment ==
The ICTY found Karadžić guilty on following counts:

- Genocide
- Persecutions (crimes against humanity)
- Extermination (crimes against humanity)
- Murder (crimes against humanity)
- Murder (violations of the laws or customs of war)
- Deportation (crimes against humanity)
- Inhumane acts – forcible transfer (crimes against humanity)
- Terror (violations of the laws or customs of war)
- Unlawful attacks on civilians (violations of the laws or customs of war)
- Hostage-taking (violations of the laws or customs of war)

On 20 March 2019, the appeal judgement of the International Residual Mechanism for Criminal Tribunals sentenced him to a life in prison.

== See also ==
- Srebrenica massacre
- Bosnian genocide case
- List of people indicted in the International Criminal Tribunal for the former Yugoslavia
- Manhunt (military)
- The Hunt: Me and the War Criminals
