= Miodrag Jokić =

Commander in the Yugoslav Navy (1935–2022)

- Born: 25 February 1935; Donja Toplica, part of Donji Mušić, municipality of Mionica, Kingdom of Yugoslavia (now Serbia)
- Died: 22 October 2022 (aged 87); The Hague, Netherlands
- Military career
- Service years: 1960–1992
- Rank: Vice Admiral (JNA); Commander of the 9th VPS of the Yugoslav Navy; Republican Secretary of National Defence of Serbia

Miodrag Jokić (25 February 1935 – 22 October 2022) was the last commander of the Yugoslav Navy. The International Tribunal for the Former Yugoslavia (ICTY) sentenced him to 7 years in prison for murder, cruel treatment, attacks on civilians, devastation, unlawful attacks on civilian objects, destruction or wilful damage done to institutions in Dubrovnik during the 1991 siege.

== Biography ==
Jokić was born in Serbia and educated in the Yugoslav military-naval academy. In 1991, after serving as an officer for a number of years, he was promoted to Vice Admiral and then to the Commander of the 9th VPS of the Yugoslav navy. After Croatia declared independence from Yugoslavia that year, the Yugoslav Army invaded the Dubrovnik area and started a three-month siege in order to keep that territory under Yugoslav control. The siege failed and the army had to retreat, while the international community condemned the attacks.

In 2001, the ICTY charged Jokić, Pavle Strugar, Milan Zec and Vladimir Kovačević on several counts. These included violations of the customs of war and attacks on the UNESCO heritage site of the Old Town. Strugar and Jokić voluntarily surrendered to the court, becoming the first Serbian or Montenegrin citizens to do so. His surrender sparked protests in Serbia.

On 1 April 2003, Jokić pleaded guilty to six counts in his second indictment and thus no trial was necessary. He admitted his guilt and expressed his remorse for his actions in Dubrovnik:

I was aware of my command responsibility for the acts of my subordinates in combat and for the failings and mistakes in the exercise of command over troops. At the same time, I felt the need for us as a responsible society to openly and sincerely face the war crimes that have been committed. I believed that it was important to start cooperating with the Tribunal and that despite all the opposition and lack of understanding in the public somebody should definitely start the process of accepting the responsibility of asking forgiveness of the victims and, as the final goal, of achieving reconciliation with the environment. Your Honour, there are two reasons why I'm here today: The first is my personal conviction that as a commander I have a moral and personal obligation to accept responsibility and to ask forgiveness for the acts of my subordinates, even though I did not order them; the second reason is the awareness of the fact that my admission of guilt and repentance and remorse are more important than my personal fate. On the 6th of December, 1991, two people were killed, three people were wounded and substantial damage was caused to civilian structures and to cultural and historical monuments in the old town of Dubrovnik. The fact that these lives were lost in the area for which I was responsible will remain etched in my consciousness for the rest of my life.

— Miodrag Jokić's statement in front of the ICTY

The ICTY considered his remorse in openly admitting guilt as a mitigating factor and thus sentenced him to 7 years in prison. He also testified against his superior Strugar during his trial at the ICTY. In 2008, he was released from prison.

The Trial Chamber in its Judgement has paid considerable attention to the crime of destruction or wilful damage done to institutions dedicated to religion, charity, education, and the arts and sciences, and to historic monuments and works of art and science. The Trial Chamber has found that this is a crime representing a violation of an especially protected value. The crime was particularly serious in the present case because the Old Town of Dubrovnik was, in its entirety, listed as a protected UNESCO site. Residential buildings within the city were therefore especially protected, together with the rest of the site, as an outstanding architectural site illustrating a significant stage in the history of humankind.

— The ICTY in its verdict against Miodrag Jokić

Jokić died in The Hague on 22 October 2022, at the age of 87.

== See also ==
- Siege of Dubrovnik
- Croatian War of Independence
