= Siege of Dubrovnik =

1991–1992 siege in Croatian War of Independence

Coordinates: 42°38′29″N 18°06′31″E

- Part of the Croatian War of Independence
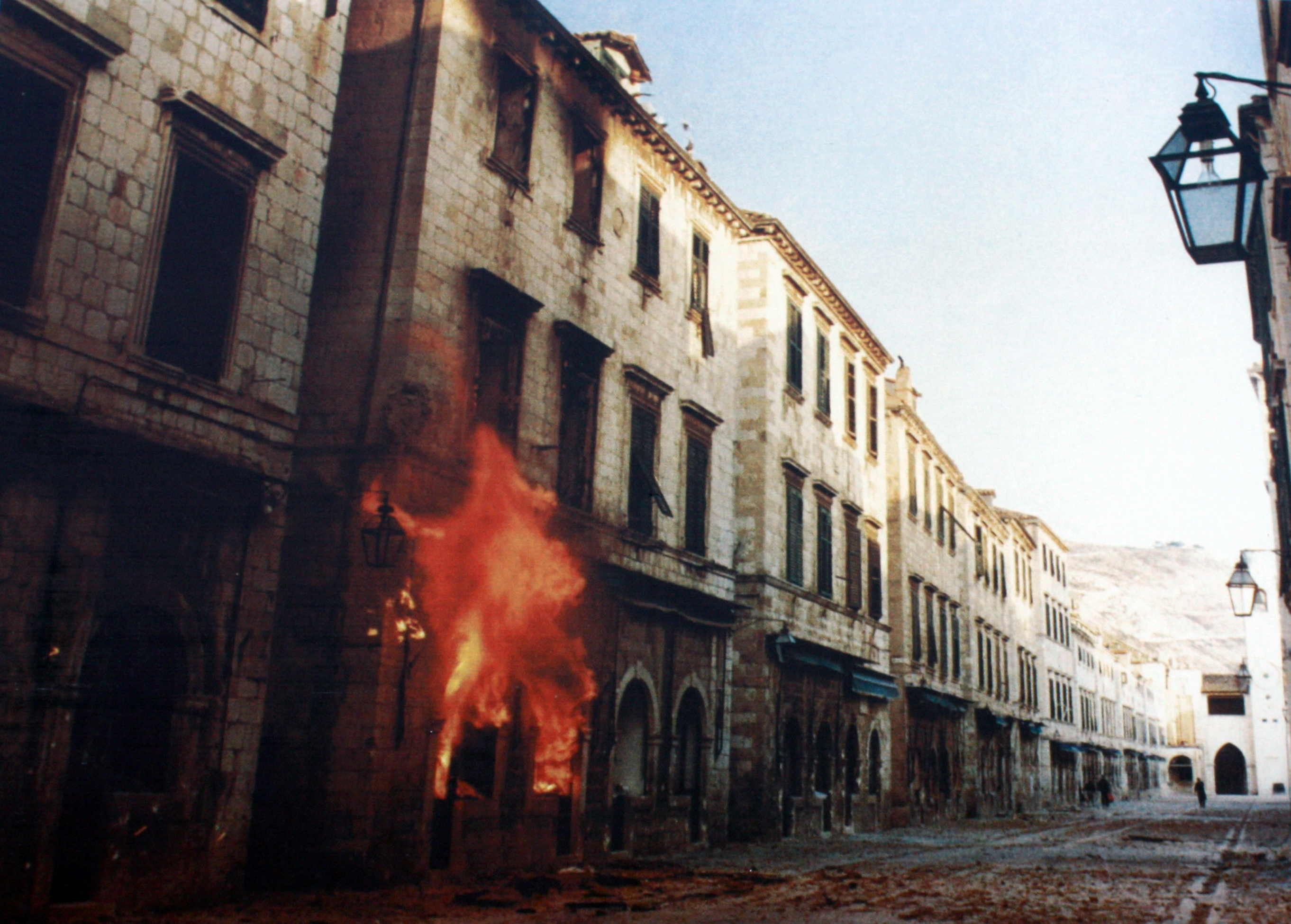
- Shelling of the Old Town of Dubrovnik
| Date | 1 October 1991 – 31 May 1992 (7 months, 4 weeks and 2 days) |
| Location | Dubrovnik area, Croatia |
| Result | Croatian victory: Siege lifted; Yugoslav troops withdraw |

Belligerents
| (Socialist Federal Republic of Yugoslavia) SFR Yugoslavia (before April 1992) (Serbia and Montenegro) FR Yugoslavia (after April 1992); Dubrovnik Republic (before May 1992) | Croatia |

Commanders and leaders
| (Socialist Federal Republic of Yugoslavia) Veljko Kadijević (Socialist Federal Republic of Yugoslavia) Pavle Strugar (Socialist Federal Republic of Yugoslavia) Miodrag Jokić (Socialist Federal Republic of Yugoslavia) Vladimir Kovačević (Republic of Serbia (1992–2006)) Slobodan Milošević; Aleksandar Aco Apolonio (Socialist Republic of Montenegro) Momir Bulatović (Socialist Republic of Montenegro) Milo Đukanović (Socialist Republic of Montenegro) Pavle Bulatović | (Croatia) Nojko Marinović (Croatia) Janko Bobetko (from May 1992) |

Units involved
| Yugoslav People's Army; Yugoslav Ground Forces; (Socialist Republic of Montenegro) Montenegro Territorial Defense; Yugoslav Navy | Croatian National Guard (October 1991); Croatian Defence Forces (October 1991); Croatian Army (from November 1991) |

Strength
| 7,000 | 480–1,000 (1991) |

Casualties and losses
| 165 killed | 194 killed |
- 82–88 Croatian civilians killed 16,000 Croatian refugees Significant damage of historical parts of Old Dubrovnik from JNA shelling

The siege of Dubrovnik (Serbo-Croatian: opsada Dubrovnika, опсада Дубровника) was a military campaign fought between the Yugoslav People's Army (JNA) and Croatian forces defending the city of Dubrovnik and its surroundings during the Croatian War of Independence. The JNA started its advance on 1 October 1991, and by late October, it had captured virtually all the land between the Pelješac and Prevlaka peninsulas on the coast of the Adriatic Sea, with the exception of Dubrovnik itself. The siege was accompanied by a Yugoslav Navy blockade. The JNA's bombardment of Dubrovnik, including that of the Old Town—a UNESCO World Heritage Site—culminated on 6 December 1991. The bombardment provoked international condemnation, and became a public relations disaster for Serbia and Montenegro, contributing to their diplomatic and economic isolation, as well as the international recognition of Croatia's independence. In May 1992, the JNA retreated to Bosnia and Herzegovina, less than 1 kilometre (0.62 miles) from the coast in some places, and handed over its equipment to the newly formed Army of Republika Srpska (VRS). During this time, the Croatian Army (HV) attacked from the west and pushed back the JNA/VRS from the areas east of Dubrovnik, both in Croatia and in Bosnia and Herzegovina, and by the end of May linked up with the HV unit defending the city. Fighting between the HV and Yugoslav troops east of Dubrovnik gradually died down.

The siege resulted in the deaths of 194 Croatian military personnel, as well as 82–88 Croatian civilians. The JNA suffered 165 fatalities. The entire region was recaptured by the HV in Operation Tiger and the Battle of Konavle by the end of 1992. The offensive resulted in the displacement of 15,000 people, mainly from Konavle, who fled to Dubrovnik. Approximately 16,000 refugees were evacuated from Dubrovnik by sea, and the city was resupplied by blockade-evading runabouts and a convoy of civilian vessels. Citizens of Dubrovnik endured three months without electricity and water. More than 11,000 buildings were damaged and numerous homes, businesses, and public buildings were looted or torched.

The operation was part of a plan drawn up by the JNA aimed at securing the Dubrovnik area and then proceeding north-west to link up with the JNA troops in northern Dalmatia via western Herzegovina. The offensive was accompanied by a significant amount of war propaganda. In 2000, Montenegrin president Milo Đukanović apologized for the siege, eliciting an angry response from his political opponents and from Serbia. The International Criminal Tribunal for the former Yugoslavia (ICTY) convicted two Yugoslav officers for their involvement in the siege and handed a third over to Serbia for prosecution. The ICTY indictment stated that the offensive was designed to detach the Dubrovnik region from Croatia and integrate it into a Serb-dominated state through an unsuccessful proclamation of a "Dubrovnik Republic" on 24 November 1991. In addition, Montenegro convicted four former JNA soldiers of prisoner abuse at the Morinj camp. Croatia also charged several former JNA or Yugoslav Navy officers and a former Bosnian Serb leader with war crimes, but no trials have yet resulted from these indictments.

== Background ==
Dubrovnik on the map of Croatia. RSK and Yugoslav Army-held areas near Dubrovnik in early 1992 are highlighted red.

In August 1990, an insurrection took place in Croatia, centred on the predominantly Serb-populated areas of the Dalmatian hinterland around the city of Knin, parts of the Lika, Kordun, and Banovina regions, and settlements in eastern Croatia with significant Serb populations. These areas were subsequently named the Republic of Serbian Krajina (RSK) and after declaring its intention to integrate with Serbia, the Government of Croatia declared the RSK a rebellion. By March 1991, the conflict had escalated and the Croatian War of Independence erupted. In June 1991, Croatia declared its independence as Yugoslavia disintegrated. A three-month moratorium followed, after which the decision came into effect on 8 October. The RSK then initiated a campaign of ethnic cleansing against Croat civilians, expelling most non-Serbs by early 1993. By November 1993, fewer than 400 ethnic Croats remained in the United Nations (UN) protected area known as Sector South, and a further 1,500 – 2,000 remained in Sector North.

As the Yugoslav People's Army (JNA) increasingly supported the RSK, and the Croatian Police were unable to cope with the situation, the Croatian National Guard (ZNG) was formed in May 1991. In November, the ZNG was renamed the Croatian Army (HV). The development of the military of Croatia was hampered by a UN arms embargo introduced in September, while the military conflict in Croatia continued to escalate with the Battle of Vukovar, which started on 26 August.

Dubrovnik is the southernmost major Croatian city. It is located on the Adriatic Sea coast. The walled city centre, known as the Old Town, is a site of historical monuments and heritage buildings largely dating to the Republic of Ragusa; the city has been placed on the list of UNESCO World Heritage Sites. In 1991, the Dubrovnik area had a population of approximately 40,000, of whom 82.4% were Croats and 6.8% were Serbs. Croatian territory surrounding the city stretches from the Pelješac peninsula to the west and the Prevlaka peninsula in the east at the entrance to the Bay of Kotor on the border with Montenegro. This territory is very narrow, especially near Dubrovnik itself, and consists of a 0.5-to-15-kilometre (0.31-to-9.32-mile) wide coastal strip of land.

== Prelude ==
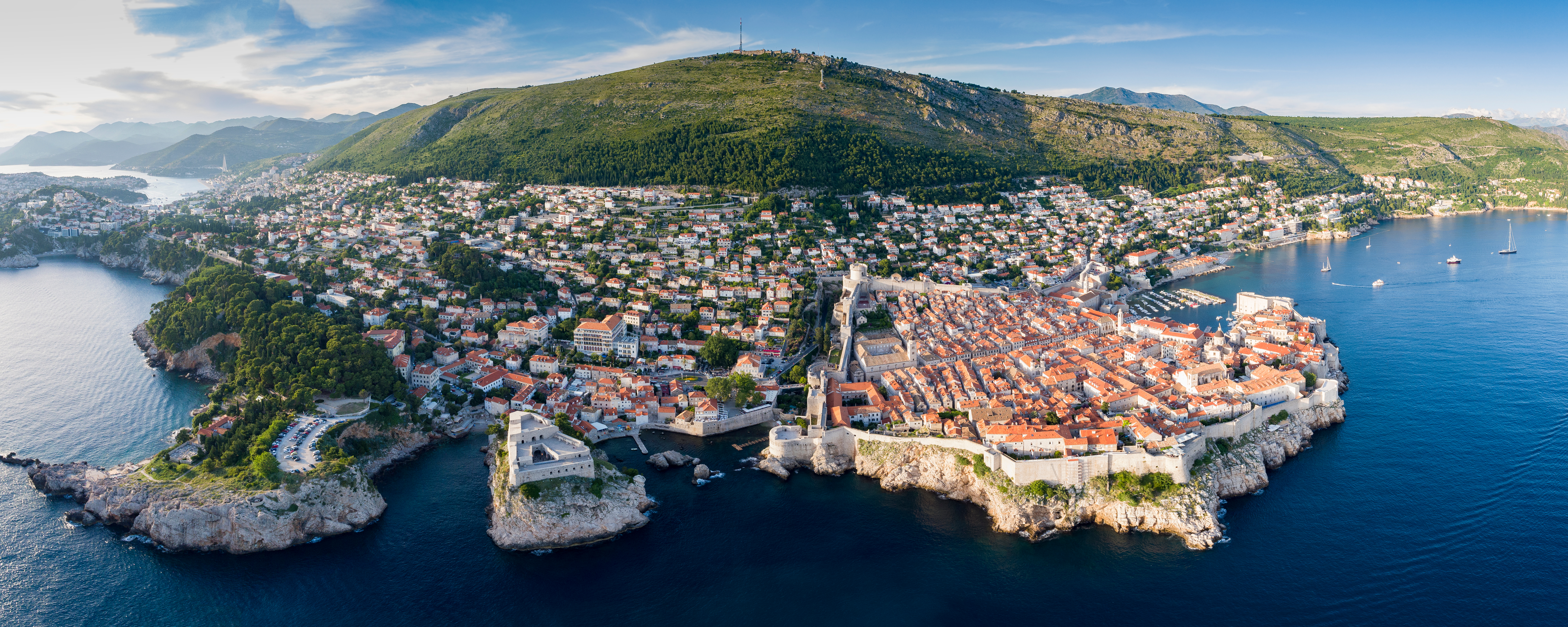
Panoramic view of Dubrovnik

In mid-1991, top JNA commanders—including Yugoslav Federal Defence Minister General Veljko Kadijević, JNA Chief of the General Staff General Blagoje Adžić and deputy defence minister Vice Admiral Stane Brovet—planned a military offensive entailing an attack on the Dubrovnik area followed by a westward JNA advance towards western Herzegovina to link up with the JNA 9th Knin Corps in northern Dalmatia once the area was secured. General Jevrem Cokić submitted the plan of the Dubrovnik offensive to Adžić for his approval.

In September 1991, the JNA and the leaders of Montenegro agreed that Dubrovnik should be attacked and neutralized to ensure Montenegro's territorial integrity, to prevent ethnic clashes and to preserve the Socialist Federal Republic of Yugoslavia. Montenegrin Prime Minister Milo Đukanović stated that Croatian borders needed be revised, attributing the existing border line to "poorly educated Bolshevik cartographers". The propaganda, compounded by JNA Colonel General Pavle Strugar's allegations that 30,000 Croatian troops and 7,000 terrorists and Kurdish mercenaries were about to attack Montenegro and seize the Bay of Kotor, led many in Montenegro to believe that Croatia had actually started an invasion. The newspaper Pobjeda was the most significant media source that contributed to the spread of the propaganda. In July 1991, high-ranking Serbian official Mihalj Kertes said at a political rally in Nikšić that a Serbian state was to be established west of Montenegro extending to the Neretva River with Dubrovnik—renamed Nikšić-at-Sea—as its capital.

On 16 September 1991, the JNA mobilized in Montenegro citing the deteriorating situation in Croatia. Despite a radio broadcast appeal by the JNA 2nd Titograd Corps on 17 September, considerable numbers of reservists refused to respond to the call-up. On 18 September, Đukanović threatened harsh punishment of deserters and those refusing to respond to the mobilization, while calling to "draw the demarcation lines vis-à-vis the Croats once and for all". The army mobilization and the propaganda of the Montenegrin government were in contrast with assurances from the Yugoslav federal authorities in Belgrade that there would be no attack against Dubrovnik. The JNA's strategic plan to defeat Croatia included an offensive to cut off the southernmost parts of Croatia, including Dubrovnik, from the rest of the country.

On 23 September, JNA artillery attacked the village of Vitaljina in the eastern part of Konavle and Brgat to the east of Dubrovnik. Two days later, the Yugoslav Navy blockaded maritime routes to the city. On 26 September, the JNA renamed its Eastern Herzegovina Operational Group the 2nd Operational Group and subordinated it directly to the Federal Ministry of Defence and the JNA General Staff. Cokić was appointed the first commanding officer of the 2nd Operational Group but was replaced by General Mile Ružinovski on 5 October following the fall of Cokić's helicopter on 30 September. Strugar replaced Ružinovski on 12 October. On 1 October, the day of the start of operations on Dubrovnik, Montenegrin Ministry of the Interior Pavle Bulatovic issued a secret order to the Republic's Special Police Unit to mobilize and assist the JNA in "carrying out combat operations in the conflict of war on the border between the Republic of Montenegro and the Republic of Croatia."

== Order of battle ==
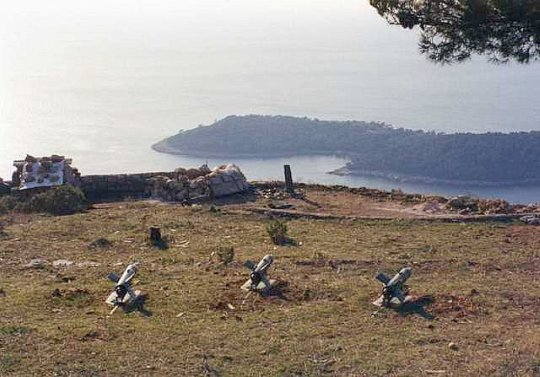
JNA positions overlooking Dubrovnik, 9 December 1991. Three 9K11 Malyutka anti-tank guided missiles in a firing position are visible.

The JNA tasked the 2nd Titograd Corps and the 9th Boka Kotorska Military-Maritime Sector (VPS)—both of which were elements of the 2nd Operational Group—with cutting off and capturing the Dubrovnik area. The 2nd Titograd Corps deployed the 1st Nikšić Brigade while the 9th Boka Kotorska VPS employed the 5th and the 472nd Motorized Brigades. The Corps boundary running north-to-south near Dubrovnik was set. The 2nd Operational Group also commanded the 16th Border Patrol Detachment and 107th Coastal Artillery Group, and mobilised Territorial Defence units from Herceg-Novi, Kotor, Tivat, Budva, Bar, Mojkovac, Bijelo Polje and Trebinje. Strugar was in overall command of the 2nd Operative Group while the 9th Boka Kotorska VPS was commanded by Vice Admiral Miodrag Jokić. Jokić replaced Admiral Krsto Đurović, who had died in uncertain circumstances hours before the offensive began. Major General Nojko Marinović, once commanding the 472nd Motorized Brigade and subordinate of Đurović, said that the JNA had killed the admiral because he opposed the offensive. Marinović resigned his post on 17 September and joined the Croatian ZNG. The JNA 2nd Operational Group initially deployed 7,000 troops and maintained similar troop levels throughout the offensive.

The defences of Dubrovnik were almost non-existent—at the outset of hostilities there were 480 troops in the city area, out of which only 50 had some training. The only regular military unit was a platoon armed with light infantry weapons that was stationed in the Napoleonic era Fort Imperial atop the Srđ Hill overlooking Dubrovnik. The rest of the troops in the area were poorly armed because the Croatian Territorial Defence had been disarmed by the JNA in 1989. Unlike elsewhere in Croatia, there had been no JNA garrisons or storage depots in Dubrovnik since 1972 and thus very few arms and munitions captured during the September Battle of the Barracks were available to defend Dubrovnik. On 26 September 200 rifles and four artillery pieces captured from the JNA on the island of Korčula were sent to reinforce the city. The guns were a mix of 76 mm and 85 mm Soviet World War II-era divisional guns. In addition, an improvised armoured vehicle was supplied to the city. Dubrovnik also received additional HV, Croatian Police and Croatian Defence Forces troops from other parts of Croatia. This brought the number of Croatian troops in Dubrovnik to 600. By November, about 1,000 Croatian troops were defending the city. On 19 September, Marinović was appointed commanding officer of the defences in Dubrovnik, at which time he assessed them as inadequate. The troops, initially organized as the Territorial Defence of Dubrovnik, were reorganized into the HV 75th Independent Battalion on 28 December 1991 and were later reinforced with elements of the 116th Infantry Brigade to form the 163rd Infantry Brigade on 13 February 1992. The Armed Boats Squadron Dubrovnik, a volunteer military unit of the Croatian Navy consisting of 23 vessels of various sizes and 117 volunteers, was established on 23 September to counter the Yugoslav Navy blockade.

== Timeline ==
=== JNA advance ===
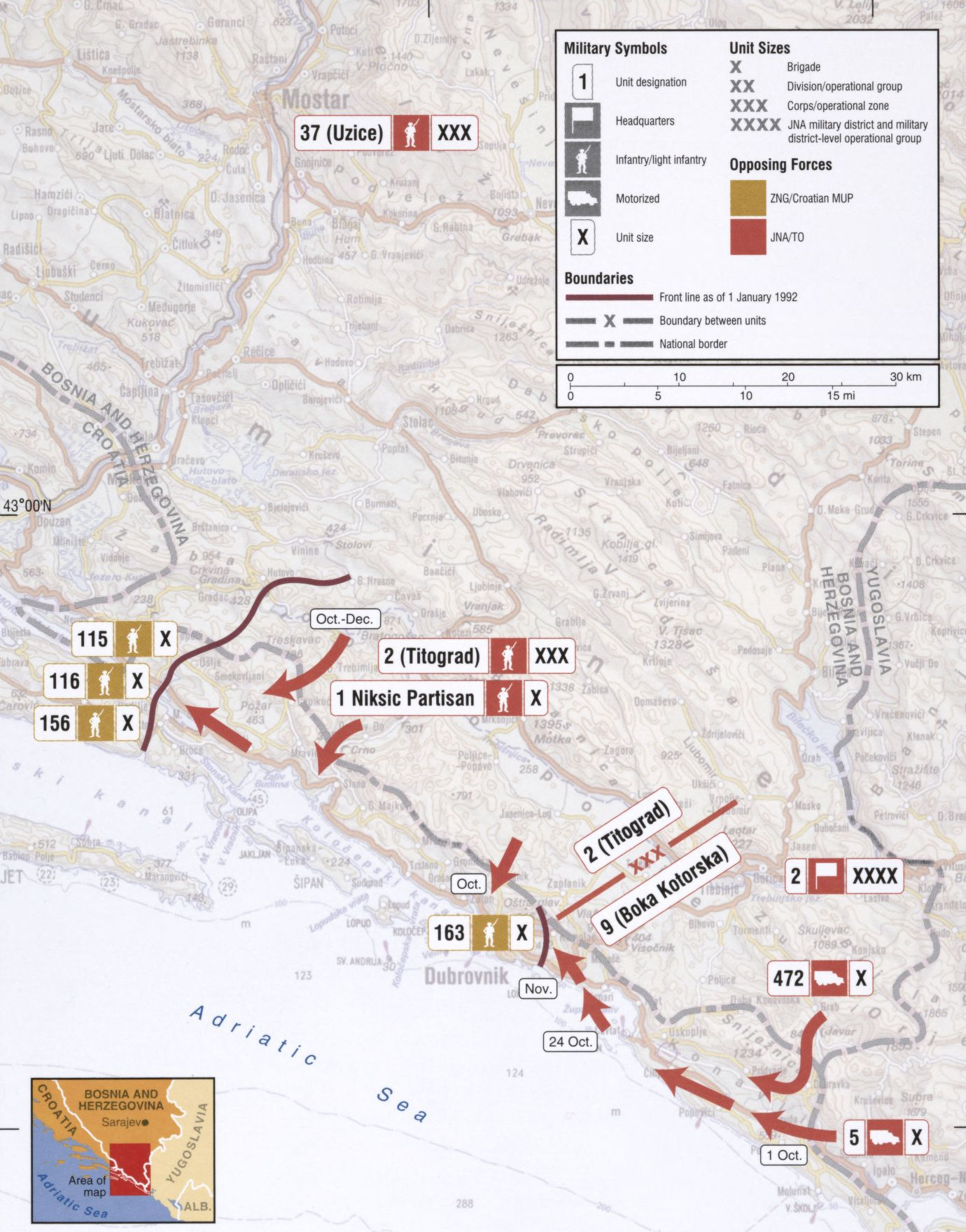
Map of the JNA advance to Dubrovnik from October to December 1991

On 1 October, the JNA started its offensive towards Dubrovnik, moving the 2nd Titograd Corps west through the Popovo field north of the city. The JNA 2nd Corps destroyed the village of Ravno before turning south towards Dubrovačko Primorje area, aiming to envelop Dubrovnik from the west. The second axis of the JNA advance was assigned to the 9th Boka Kotorska VPS. It originated in the Bay of Kotor about 35 kilometres (22 miles) south-east of Dubrovnik and was directed through Konavle. The advance started at 5 am after preparatory artillery fire against Vitaljina and other targets in Konavle. The advance, using several roads in the region, was supported by the Yugoslav Navy and the Air Force. Croatian defences were nonexistent in Konavle and light in Dubrovačko Primorje—the only JNA casualties of the day occurred during a successful ZNG ambush in the village of Čepikuće. On the first day of the offensive, JNA artillery attacked Srđ Hill and the Žarkovica promontory just to the north and east of Dubrovnik, while Yugoslav Air Force MiG-21s struck Komolac in Rijeka Dubrovačka to the west, destroying supplies of electricity and water to Dubrovnik. Until the end of December, Dubrovnik relied on fresh water supplied by boats and electricity from a few electric generators.

Over the next three days, the JNA made slow progress. Its artillery attacked Srđ Hill, the Fort Imperial and Žarkovica on 2 October. The next day, the JNA shelled Belvedere Hotel, where a ZNG defence post was located, and the Yugoslav Air Force bombarded the city's Argentina Hotel. On 4 October, the JNA 2nd Corps captured Slano in Dubrovačko Primorje, interdicting the Adriatic Highway there and isolating Dubrovnik from the rest of Croatia. On 5 October, the Ploče district of Dubrovnik was shelled, followed by a Yugoslav Air Force strike on the Fort Imperial the next day.

On 15 October, Croatia offered peace talks to Montenegro, but the President of Serbia Slobodan Milošević dismissed the offer. The offer was made to the Montenegrin officials because the offensive was first officially endorsed by the Montenegrin government on 1 October. Three days later, Serbia publicly distanced itself from the move, blaming Croatia for provoking the JNA. On the seventh day of the offensive, the Montenegrin parliament held a joint extraordinary section to discuss the future status of the Prevlaka Peninsula, while at the same time declaring that the JNA "was the only instance responsible" for the deployment of Montenegrin reservists. On 16 October—a day after Milošević declined the Croatian offer—the JNA 9th Boka Kotorska VPS force captured Cavtat. The capture of Cavtat was supported by an amphibious landing operation approximately 5 kilometres (3.1 miles) east of Dubrovnik and an airstrike on Ploče district of Dubrovnik on 18 October. The following day, a ceasefire was agreed but it was violated as soon as it came into effect. On 20 October, the Yugoslav Air Force attacked Dubrovnik and on 22 October, the Yugoslav Navy bombarded hotels housing refugees in the Lapad area of the city.

On 23 October, the JNA started a sustained artillery bombardment of Dubrovnik, including the Old Town within the city walls, drawing a protest from the United States Department of State the next day. The JNA 9th VPS captured Župa Dubrovačka and Brgat on 24 October, while the Yugoslav Navy bombarded Lokrum Island. The next day, the JNA issued an ultimatum to the city, demanding its surrender and the removal of elected officials from Dubrovnik. On 26 October, the JNA captured the Žarkovica promontory 2.3 kilometres (1.4 miles) south-east from the city centre, and took most of the high ground overlooking Dubrovnik by 27 October. The JNA 2nd Corps south-western drive towards Dubrovnik was slower. It destroyed a large portion of the Trsteno Arboretum. The JNA advance displaced about 15,000 refugees from the areas it captured. About 7,000 people were evacuated from Dubrovnik by sea in October; the rest took refuge in hotels and elsewhere in the city.

=== Defence of Dubrovnik ===
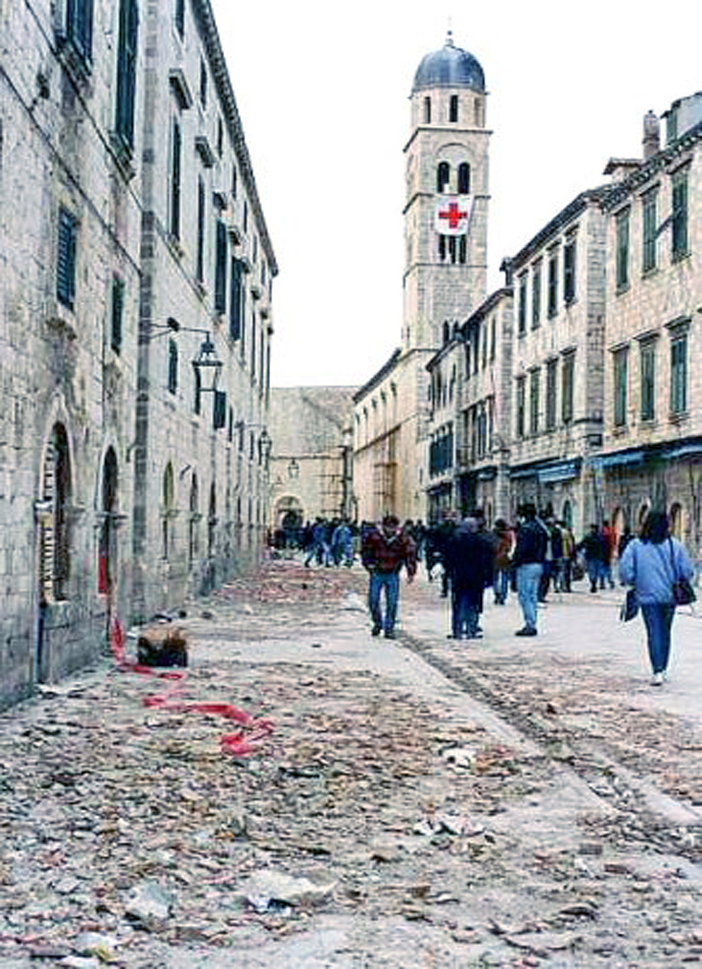
Civilians walking along Stradun Street during the siege

The JNA continued its artillery strikes against Dubrovnik on 30 October and the bombardment continued until 4 November, targeting the western areas of Dubrovnik—Gruž and Lapad—as well as the Babin Kuk and Argentina hotels, which were housing refugees. On 3–4 November, JNA troops attacked the Old Town and the Argentina Hotel using small arms and sniper fire from positions held by the 3rd Battalion of the JNA 472th Motorized Brigade, which occupied the positions closest to the city centre. The next day, Fort Imperial was bombarded once again. On 7 November, the JNA issued a new ultimatum demanding the surrender of Dubrovnik by noon. The demand was rejected and Jokić announced that the JNA would only spare the Old Town from destruction. The same day, fighting resumed near Slano.

JNA artillery and the Yugoslav Navy resumed the bombardment of Dubrovnik between 9 and 12 November, targeting the Old Town, Gruž, Lapad and Ploče, as well as the Belvedere, Excelsior, Babin Kuk, Tirena, Imperial and Argentina hotels. Wire-guided missiles were used to attack boats in the Old Town harbour, while some larger ships at the port of Gruž—including the ferryboat Adriatic and the American-owned sailing ship Pelagic, were set ablaze and destroyed by gunfire. Fort Imperial was attacked by the JNA on 9, 10 and 13 November. These attacks were followed by a lull which lasted until the end of November when the European Community Monitoring Mission (ECMM) mediated in negotiations between the JNA and Croatian authorities in Dubrovnik. The ECMM was withdrawn in mid-November after its personnel were attacked by the JNA, and the mediation was taken over by French State Secretary for Humanitarian Affairs Bernard Kouchner and UNICEF Mission Chief Stephan Di Mistura. The negotiations produced ceasefire agreements on 19 November and 5 December, but neither yielded any specific results on the ground. Instead, the JNA 2nd Corps units located in Dubrovačko Primorje, north-west of Dubrovnik, closed in on the city, reaching the farthest point of their advance on 24 November, as the city defences were pushed back to Sustjepan–Srđ–Belvedere Hotel line. That day, the JNA tried to establish the "Dubrovnik Republic" in the area it occupied, but the attempt ultimately failed.

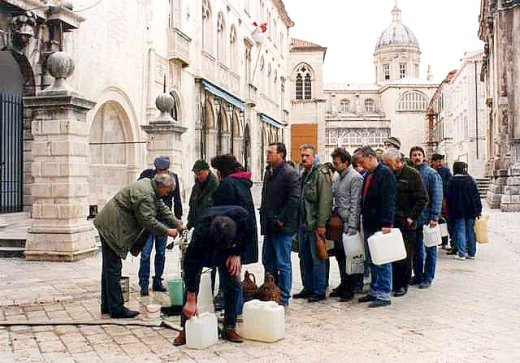
People queue at a water pipe during the siege

In November, Dubrovnik began receiving the largest deliveries of humanitarian aid since the beginning of the siege. The first successful attempt to sustain the city was the Libertas convoy—a fleet of civilian vessels, the largest being Jadrolinija's Slavija—which arrived in Dubrovnik on 31 October. The convoy sailed from Rijeka and made several port calls, growing to 29 vessels as it approached Dubrovnik. The convoy—which also carried the ECMM observers, at least 1,000 protesters, the President of the Presidency of Yugoslavia Stjepan Mesić and the former Prime Minister of Croatia Franjo Gregurić—was initially stopped by the Yugoslav frigate JRM Split between the islands of Brač and Šolta, and the next day by Yugoslav patrol boats off Korčula before the Armed Boats Squadron linked up with the fleet and escorted it to the Port of Dubrovnik in Gruž. On its return, the 700-capacity Slavija evacuated 2,000 refugees from Dubrovnik, although she had to sail to the Bay of Kotor first for inspection by the Yugoslav Navy.

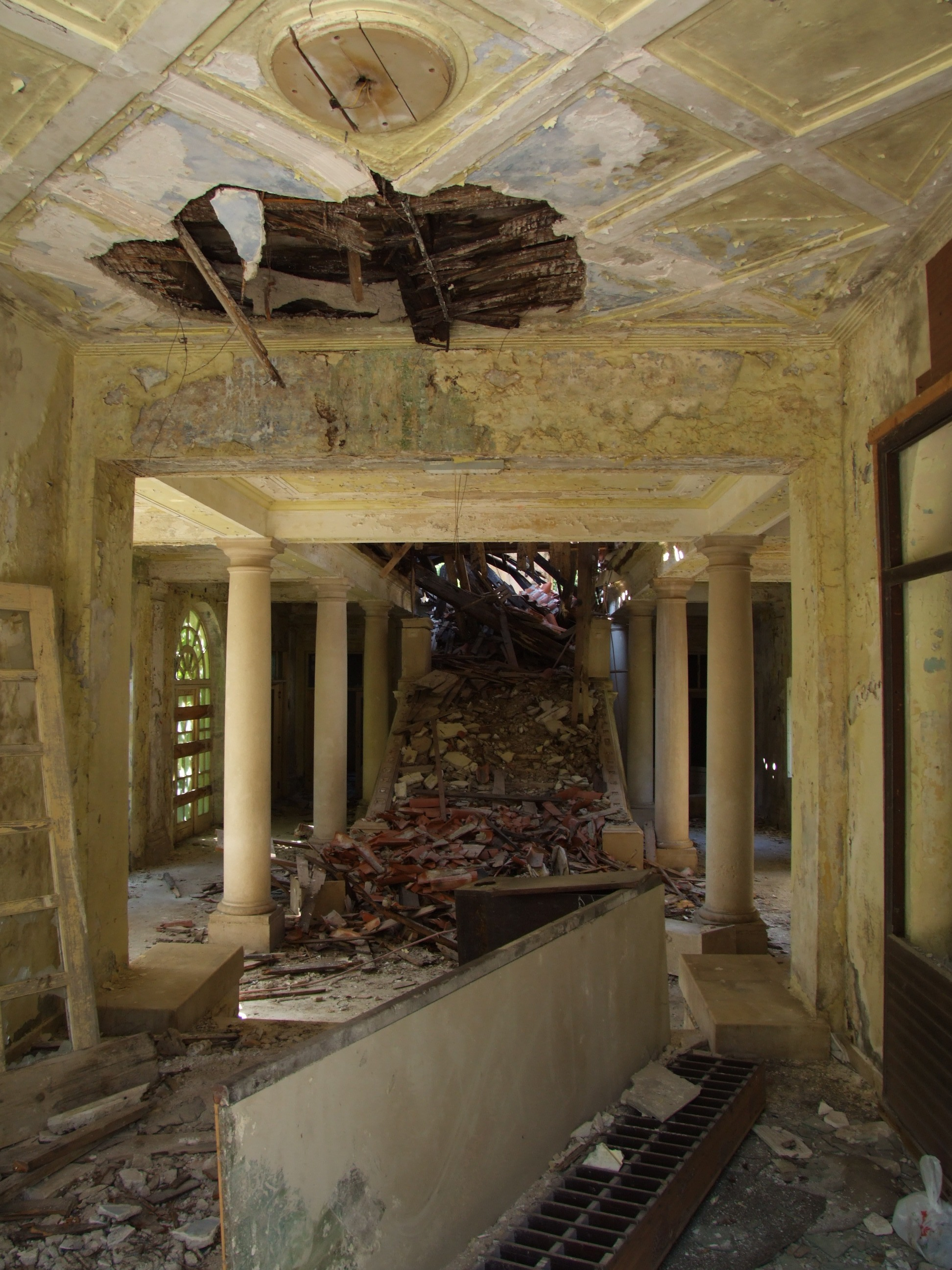
The Hotel Grand in Kupari was destroyed during the siege

On 2–3 December, the JNA resumed infantry weapons fire against the Old Town, followed by mortar fire against Fort Imperial on 4 December. The heaviest bombardment of the Old Town started at 5:48 am on 6 December. The Old Town was struck by 48 82-millimetre (3.2 in) missiles, 232 82-millimetre (3.2 in) and 364 120-millimetre (4.7 in) mortar shells, as well as 22 wire-guided missiles. Two impact craters indicated the use of heavier weapons. The bombardment was concentrated on Stradun—the central promenade of the Old Town—and areas north-east of Stradun, while other parts of the Old Town sustained relatively few impacts. The attack subsided at 11:30 am. It killed 13 civilians—the heaviest loss of civilian life during the siege. The Dubrovnik Inter-University Centre library containing 20,000 volumes was also destroyed in the attack and the Libertas Hotel was bombarded by JNA artillery aiming to kill firefighters putting out fires caused by an attack earlier that day. The 6 December attack of the Old Town was met with strong protests from the international media, UNESCO Director-General Federico Mayor Zaragoza, Special Envoy of the Secretary-General of the United Nations Cyrus Vance and the ECMM on the day of the bombardment. Later that day, the JNA issued a statement of regret and promised an inquiry. On 7 December, representatives of the JNA visited the Old Town to inspect the damage but no further actions were noted.

All of the Croatian defences were 3 to 4 kilometres (1.9 to 2.5 miles) away from the Old Town, except for Fort Imperial about 1 kilometre (0.62 miles) to the north. The fortress was attacked at 5:50 am—minutes after the bombardment of the Old Town began. The attack was executed by the 3rd Battalion of the JNA 472nd Motorized Brigade, advancing simultaneously from two directions. The primary attack consisted of a company-sized force, and the secondary of a platoon of infantrymen—both supported by T-55 tanks and artillery. By 8 am, the infantry reached Fort Imperial, forcing the defending force to retreat into the fortification and request help. Marinović ordered HV artillery to fire directly onto the fortress and dispatched a special police unit to reinforce the Fort Imperial garrison. By 2 pm, the JNA called off the attack. That day, Sveti Vlaho—the first vessel commissioned by the Armed Boats Squadron Dubrovnik and named after the patron saint of the city Saint Blaise—was sunk by a wire-guided missile.

=== Croatian counterattack ===
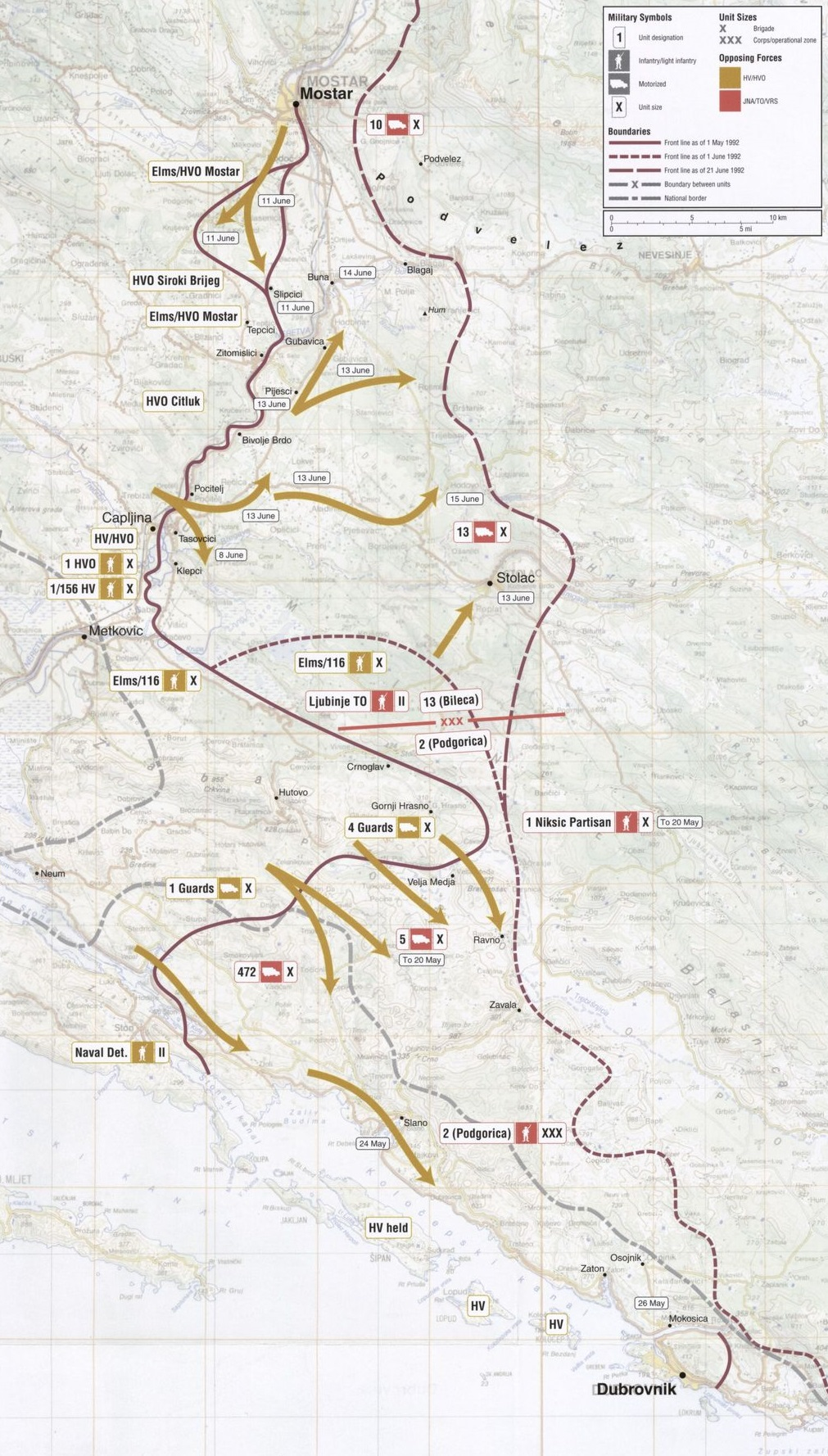
Map of the HV advance to Dubrovnik in May 1992 and the subsequent Operation Jackal

On 7 December 1991, another ceasefire was agreed and the JNA force besieging Dubrovnik became largely inactive. In January 1992, the Sarajevo Agreement was signed by representatives of Croatia, the JNA and the UN, and fighting was paused. The United Nations Protection Force (UNPROFOR) was deployed to Croatia to supervise and maintain the agreement. Serbia continued to support the RSK. The conflict largely passed onto entrenched positions and the JNA soon retreated from Croatia into Bosnia and Herzegovina, where a new conflict was anticipated. The only exception was the Dubrovnik area, where the JNA attacked westward from Dubrovačko Primorje, pushing back elements of the HV's 114th and 116th Infantry Brigades and reaching the outskirts of Ston by the beginning of 1992.

The capabilities of the HV increased dramatically in the first few months of 1992 because it acquired large stockpiles of JNA's weapons in the Battle of the Barracks. After the JNA disengaged in Croatia, its personnel prepared to set up a new Bosnian Serb army, later renamed the Army of Republika Srpska (VRS). The move followed the Bosnian Serb declaration of the Serbian Republic of Bosnia and Herzegovina on 9 January 1992, ahead of the 29 February–1 March 1992 referendum on Bosnia and Herzegovina's independence. The referendum would later be cited as a pretext for the Bosnian War, which commenced in early April 1992, when the VRS's artillery began shelling Sarajevo. The JNA and the VRS in Bosnia and Herzegovina were confronted by the Army of the Republic of Bosnia and Herzegovina and the Croatian Defence Council (HVO), reporting to the Bosniak-dominated central government and the Bosnian Croat leadership respectively. The HV sometimes deployed to Bosnia and Herzegovina to support the HVO.

In April 1992, the JNA began offensive operations against the HV and the HVO in areas of western and southern Herzegovina near Kupres and Stolac. The 4th Military District of the JNA, commanded by Strugar, aimed to capture Stolac and most of the eastern bank of the Neretva River south of Mostar. The fighting around Mostar and JNA artillery attacks on the city started on 6 April. The JNA pushed the HV/HVO force from Stolac on 11 April and Čapljina came under JNA fire. A ceasefire was arranged on 7 May but the JNA and the Bosnian Serb forces resumed the attack the next day. The attack succeeded in capturing a large part of Mostar and some territory on the western bank of the Neretva River. On 12 May, the JNA forces based in Bosnia and Herzegovina became part of the VRS, and the JNA 2nd Operational Group was renamed as the 4th VRS Herzegovina Corps. Croatia saw the JNA moves as a prelude to attacks on southern Croatia specifically aimed at the Port of Ploče and possibly Split. To counter the threat, the HV appointed General Janko Bobetko to command the Southern Front, encompassing the Herzegovina and Dubrovnik areas. Bobetko reorganized the HVO command structure and assumed command of the HVO in the region and newly deployed HV units, the 1st Guards and the 4th Guards Brigades.

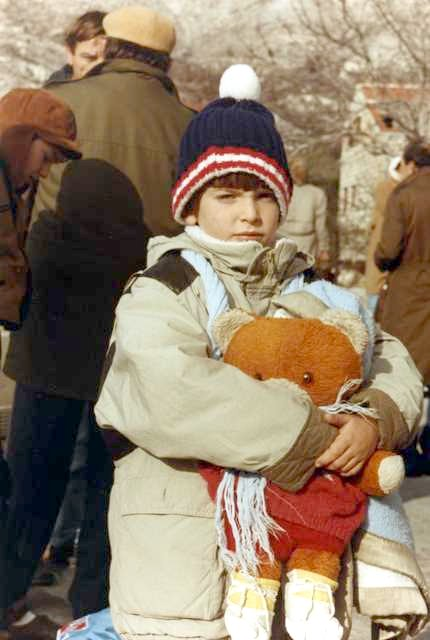
A child waiting to be evacuated from Dubrovnik in December 1991

The VRS and JNA attacked north of Ston on 11 April, pushing back elements of the HV 115th Infantry Brigade and elements of the arriving HV Guards Brigades for only modest territorial gain. The frontline stabilized by 23 April and the HV counterattacked and reclaimed some ground after 27 April. On 17 May, Bobetko ordered a major attack of the two full guards brigades. The 1st Guards Brigade was tasked with advancing to link up with the Ston Company guarding access to the Pelješac Peninsula and advance to Slano. The 4th Guards Brigade was ordered to secure the hinterland of the Dubrovačko Primorje by advancing along the rim of the Popovo field. At the same time, the JNA was pressured by the international community to pull back east of Dubrovnik to Konavle.

The 1st Guards Brigade, supported by elements of the 115th Infantry Brigade, captured Čepikuće on 21 May and Slano on 22–23 May. The Armed Boats Squadron Dubrovnik landed troops in Slano the previous night, but they were repulsed by the JNA. On the night of 23–24 May, the JNA attacked Sustjepan and the northern outskirts of Dubrovnik. On 26 May, the JNA started to pull out of Mokošica and Žarkovica. The 163rd Infantry Brigade advanced from Dubrovnik; its 1st Battalion took positions in Brgat and Župa Dubrovačka, and the 2nd Battalion deployed to Osojnik. On 29 May, the 4th Guards Brigade recaptured Ravno. On 31 May, the 2nd Battalion of the 163rd Brigade pushed the JNA to the Golubov Kamen massif overlooking the Adriatic Highway section tracing around the Rijeka Dubrovačka embayment, but failed to capture the massif. The brigade was relieved by the 145th Infantry Brigade on 15 June. Dubrovnik was targeted by the JNA artillery continuously until 16 June, and then intermittently until 30 June. On 7 June, the 1st Guards and the 4th Guards Brigades ceased their advance in Dubrovačko Primorje in the vicinity of Orahov Do, a village to the north of Slano.

== Aftermath ==
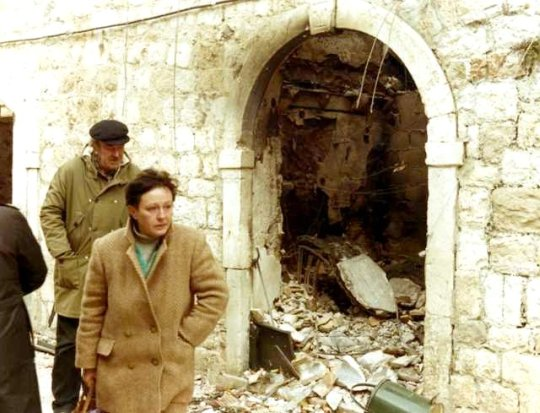
Damage after the shelling of a Dubrovnik building

Regardless of its military outcome, the siege of Dubrovnik is primarily remembered for the large-scale looting by JNA troops and the artillery bombardment of Dubrovnik, especially its Old Town. The reaction of the international media and media coverage of the siege reinforced an opinion, already taking shape since the fall of Vukovar, that the conduct of the JNA and the Serbs was barbaric and intent on dominating Croatia, regardless of the destruction of priceless cultural heritage that occurred in the process. Besides the protests made by Mayor Zaragoza, Vance and the ECMM, 104 Nobel Prize laureates published a full-page advertisement in The New York Times on 14 January 1992 at the incentive of Linus Pauling, urging governments throughout the world to stop the unrestrained destruction by the JNA. During the siege, UNESCO placed Dubrovnik on its list of World Heritage in Danger. Citizens of Dubrovnik endured three months without electricity and running water. Because the siege shaped international opinion of the Croatian War of Independence, it became a major contributor to a shift in the international diplomatic and economic isolation of Serbia and rump Yugoslavia, which came to be viewed as an aggressor-state in the West. On 17 December 1991, the European Economic Community agreed to recognize the independence of Croatia on 15 January 1992.

Between October and December 1991, the JNA captured approximately 1,200 square kilometres (460 square miles) of territory around Dubrovnik—all of which the HV recaptured in its May 1992 counterattack as the JNA pulled back east of Dubrovnik, and in subsequent HV offensives—Operation Tiger and the Battle of Konavle between July and October 1992. Between 82 and 88 Croatian civilians were killed in the siege, as were 194 Croatian military personnel. Ninety-four Croatian soldiers were killed between October and December 1991. A total of 417 were killed in all military operations around Dubrovnik by the end of October 1992. The JNA suffered 165 deaths. Approximately 15,000 refugees from Konavle and other areas around Dubrovnik fled to the city, and about 16,000 refugees were evacuated by sea from Dubrovnik to other parts of Croatia. The JNA set up two prisoner-of-war camps to detain those it had captured, one at Bileća and the other at Morinj. During and after the offensive, 432 people, mainly civilians from Konavle, were imprisoned—292 in Morinj and 140 in Bileća—and subjected to physical and psychological abuse. The abuse was perpetrated by JNA personnel and paramilitaries, as well as civilians, and included beatings and mock executions. Many of the detainees were exchanged for prisoners of war held by Croatia on 12 December 1991. The two camps remained in operation until August 1992.

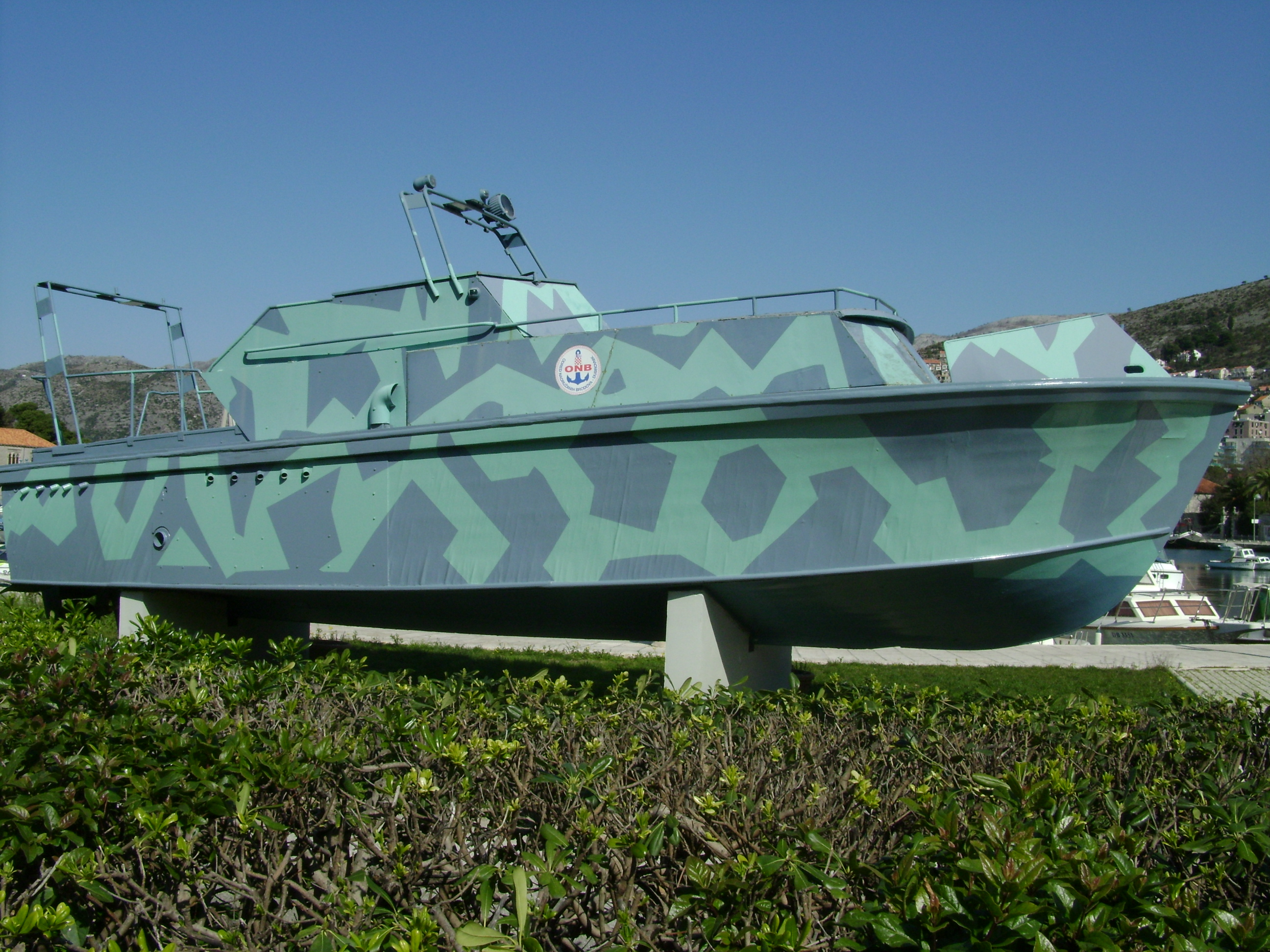
Sveti Vlaho, the first vessel of the Armed Boats Squadron Dubrovnik, is on permanent display in Dubrovnik

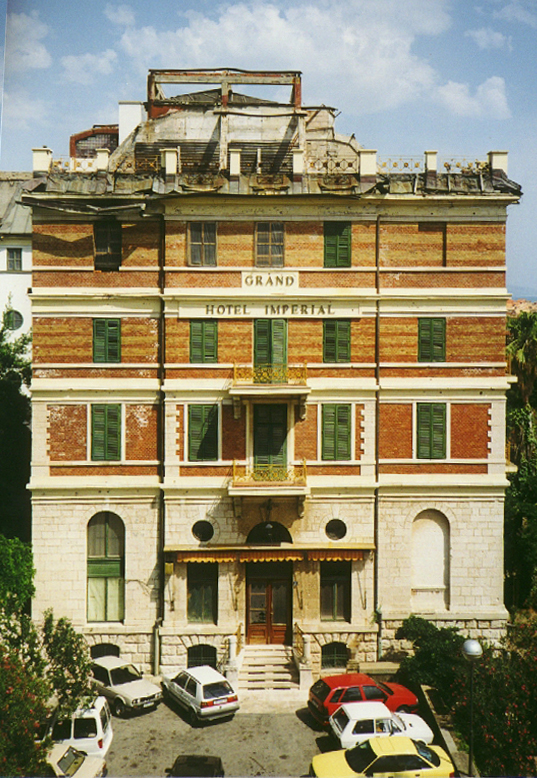
Dubrovnik Hotel Imperial after attack, currently renovated and it operates under Hilton Hotels

11,425 buildings in the region sustained damage; 886 were totally destroyed and 1,675 sustained damage. The cost of the damage was estimated at 480 million Deutsche Mark. Damage to the Old Town of Dubrovnik was observed by a UNESCO team which stayed in the city from 27 November until 20 December 1991. It was estimated that 55.9 percent of buildings were damaged, that 11.1 percent were heavily damaged and one percent were burned down. Seven burnt Baroque palaces were the greatest losses. Additional damage was caused by the JNA troops looting museums, businesses and private homes. All exhibits held by Vlaho Bukovac Memorial Museum in Cavtat were taken away by the JNA, as were contents of hotels in Kupari. The Franciscan monastery of St. Jerome in Slano was also targeted. The JNA admitted that looting took place, but Jokić said the property would be distributed to Serbian refugees by a special JNA administration set up on 15 December 1991. It is probable, however, that the looted property ended up in private homes or was sold on the black market. Dubrovnik's Čilipi Airport was also targeted and its equipment taken to Podgorica and Tivat Airports.

Following attempts to justify the JNA offensive, authorities in Serbia and Montenegro tried to deny damage to the Old Town. Radio Television of Serbia said that smoke rising from the Old Town was the result of automobile tyres set on fire by the population of Dubrovnik, echoing Kadijević. Officials and media in Montenegro referred to the offensive as the "war for peace", or a blockade—applying the term to land operations and the naval blockade. According to a 2010 survey of public opinion in Serbia, 40 percent of those polled did not know who bombarded Dubrovnik, while 14 percent believed that no shelling occurred. In a June 2000 meeting with Croatian President Mesić, the President of Montenegro Milo Đukanović apologized to Croatia for the attack. The gesture was welcomed in Croatia, but it was condemned by Đukanović's political opponents in Montenegro and by authorities in Serbia.

In 2004, in collaboration with Podgorica-based production company, Obala, Montenegrin filmmaker Koča Pavlović released a documentary entitled War for Peace (Rat za mir), covering the role of propaganda in the siege, testimonies of Morinj camp prisoners and interviews with JNA soldiers. Due to controversies within Montenegro, the film wouldn't be released until 2007, and it wouldn't be until 2022, three years after Pavlović's death, that the film would be shown within the country itself.

In 2011, Radio Television of Montenegro broadcast a documentary series using archive footage titled Rat za Dubrovnik (War for Dubrovnik), although an attempt to destroy records of warmongering television and Pobjeda newspaper reports had been made. In 2012, Aleksandar Črček and Marin Marušić produced a feature documentary titled Konvoj Libertas (Libertas Convoy), which was about the delivery of humanitarian aid to Dubrovnik through the naval blockade.

All armies in the past did their best and refused to wage war or to target and to bomb the city of Dubrovnik. It was simply impossible for anyone to attack and demolish Dubrovnik. In the 1800s, Dubrovnik was captured by Napoleon, but without a fight. The Russian fleet of Admiral Senyavin came to attack Dubrovnik but they lowered their guns and gave up on the attack. There was not a single shell or bullet fired at Dubrovnik. That's Dubrovnik's history, and that indicates the level of the human civilisation, the level of respect afforded to Dubrovnik. What we did is the greatest shame that was done in 1991.

— Nikola Samardžić, former Montenegrin foreign minister, during Strugar's trial at the ICTY.

On 12 May 2026, a memorial for children killed during the war (including 15 children killed during the siege) was opened in Gruž. It is the work of sculptor Dalibor Stošić and designer Hrvoje Bilandžić. It was opened by Croatian prime minister Andrej Plenković and mayor of Dubrovnik Mato Franković, while bishop Roko Glasnović led the prayer for the victims.

== War crime charges ==
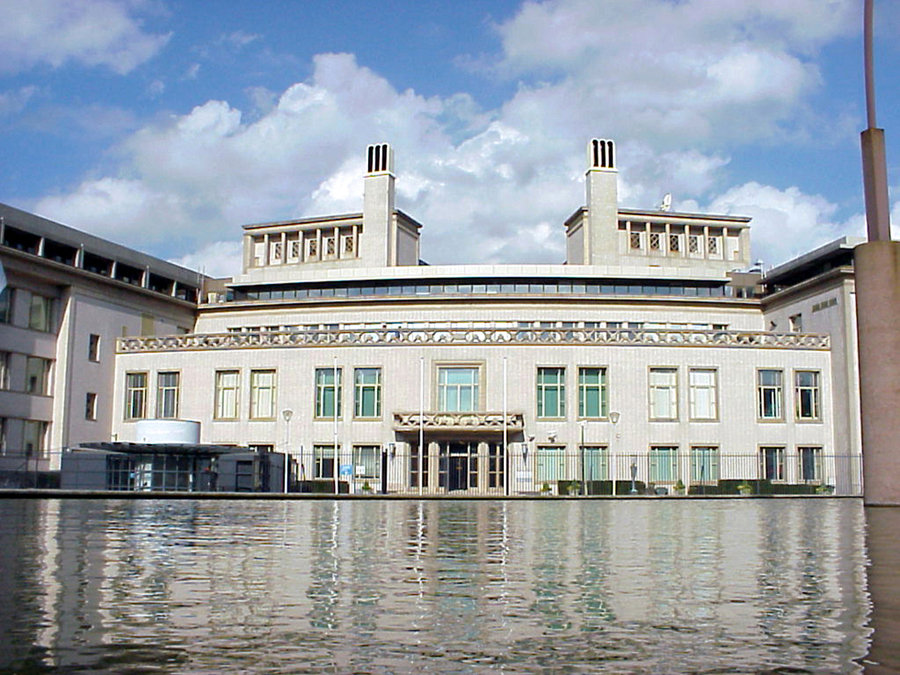
The Hague-based ICTY indicted five people for war crimes during the siege of Dubrovnik

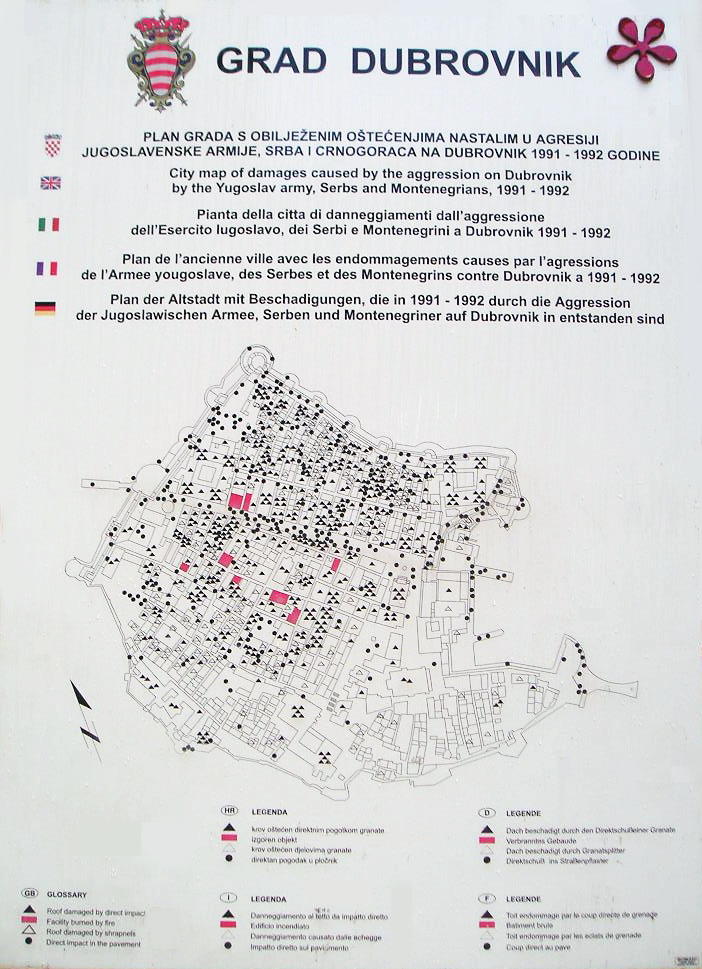
Map of the Old Town indicating JNA bombardment damage

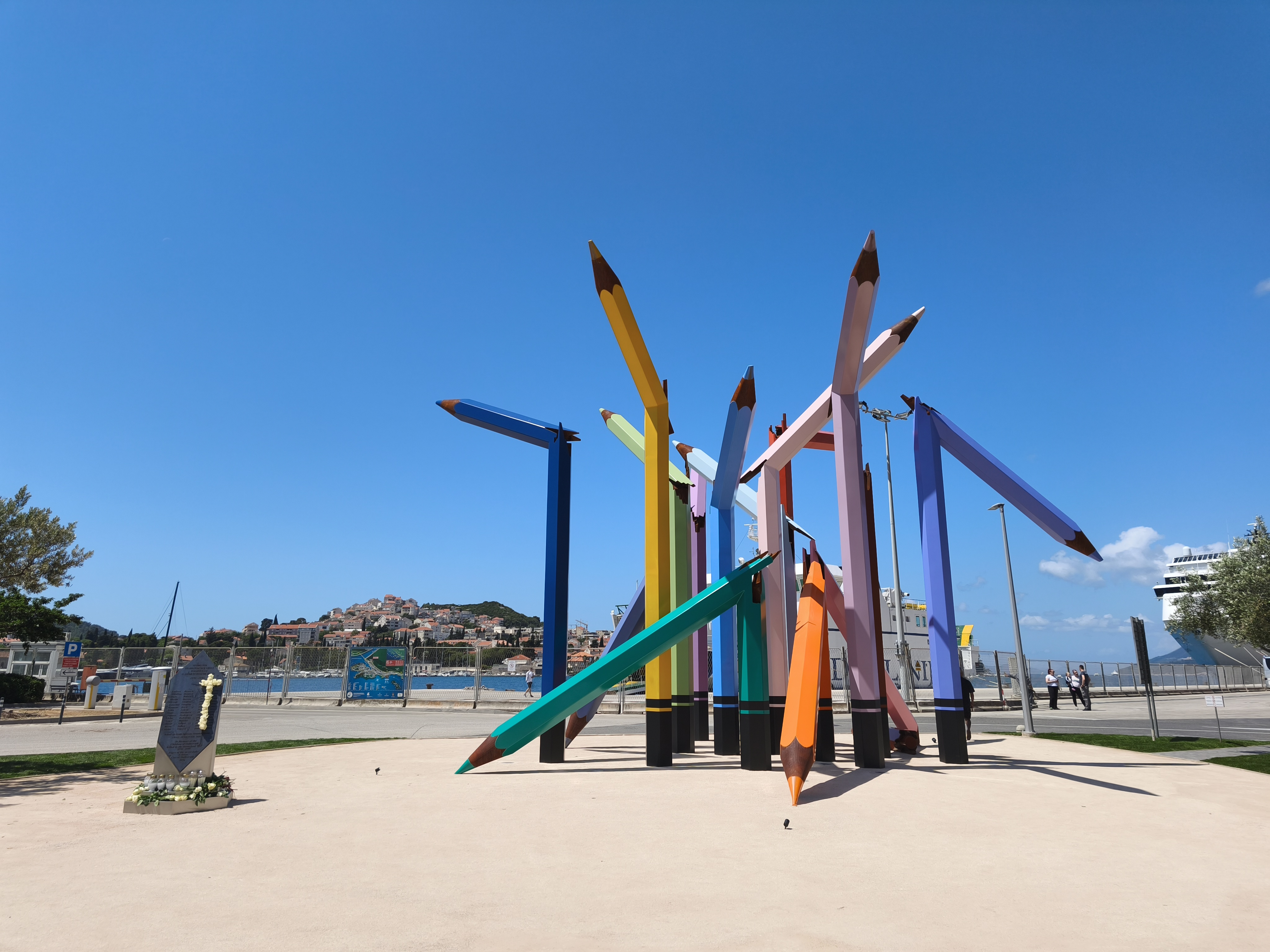
Memorial to children, killed during Siege of Dubrovnik, built in 2026

In 1994, a UN report concluded that the Yugoslav Army and its paramilitary perpetrated war crimes during the battle for Dubrovnik, including wilful killing; extensive destruction and appropriation of property; unlawful confinement of a civilian; wanton destruction of cities, towns, or villages, or devastation not justified by military necessity; attack or bombardment of undefended towns; destruction of historic monuments; and plunder.

In 2001, prosecutors of the International Criminal Tribunal for the former Yugoslavia (ICTY), set up in 1993 and based on UN Security Council Resolution 827, indicted Milošević, Strugar, Jokić, the JNA 9th VPS chief of staff Captain Milan Zec and the commanding officer of the 3rd Battalion of the JNA 472nd Motorized Brigade Captain 1st Class Vladimir Kovačević. The charges included allegations that the offensive against Dubrovnik aimed to detach the area from Croatia and annex it to Serbia or Montenegro. Jokić said that the offensive only aimed to blockade Dubrovnik, but that claim was later refuted by Cokić. Mihailo Crnobrnja, a former Yugoslav ambassador to the European Union, speculated that the siege was intended to force an end to blockades of JNA barracks in Croatia and to claim the Prevlaka Peninsula for Montenegro.

The trial of Slobodan Milošević was never completed because Milošević died on 11 March 2006 while in ICTY custody. Strugar was transferred to ICTY custody on 21 October 2001. The trial and appeals process was completed in 2008, with a final verdict of conviction of crimes—including attacks on civilians, devastation not required by military necessity and violation of the laws and customs of war. He was sentenced to seven and a half years in prison. Strugar was granted an early release in 2009, seven years and four months after his transfer to the ICTY. Jokić was turned over to the ICTY on 12 November 2001. He pleaded guilty and was convicted of crimes including murder, cruel treatment, attacks on civilians and violations of laws of war. In 2004, he was sentenced to seven years in prison. The verdict was confirmed and became final in 2005. Jokić was transferred to Denmark to serve his sentence and was released on 1 September 2008. The ICTY withdrew charges against Zec on 26 July 2002. Kovačević was arrested in 2003 in Serbia and transferred to the ICTY. Following an insanity defence, he was provisionally released on 2 June 2004 and the proceedings were transferred to the judiciary in Serbia in 2007 and he underwent psychiatric treatment at the Military Medical Academy in Belgrade. As of May 2012, Kovačević was considered unfit to stand trial by authorities in Serbia. The charges against him include murder, cruel treatment, devastation not required by military necessity and violations of laws of war.

In 2008, authorities in Montenegro charged six former JNA soldiers with prisoner abuse committed in Morinj in 1991 and 1992. Four of the six were convicted of war crimes in July 2013. Ivo Menzalin was given a four-year sentence, Špiro Lučić and Boro Gligić were sentenced to three years while Ivo Gonjić was sentenced to two. The four appealed the decision, and in April 2014, the Montenegrin Supreme Court rejected their appeal. A number of former prisoners of the Morinj camp sued Montenegro and were paid compensation.

In October 2008, Croatia indicted Božidar Vučurević—the mayor of Trebinje and Bosnian Serb leader in eastern Herzegovina at the time of the offensive—for attacks against the civilian population of Dubrovnik. Jokić confirmed that he received orders from both Strugar and Vučurević. On 4 April 2011, Vučurević was arrested in Serbia and Croatia requested his extradition. He was released on bail on 17 June. In September, the extradition request was approved but Vučurević left Serbia and returned to Trebinje, avoiding extradition. In 2009, Croatian authorities filed charges against ten JNA officers, including Cokić, Ružinovski, Strugar, Jokić, Zec and Kovačević. They were charged with war crimes committed in the area of Dubrovnik prior to or after 6 December 1991, which were not covered by the ICTY indictments. The charges were made after the ICTY supplied documents collected during its investigation. In 2012, Croatia indicted the commanding officer of the 3rd Battalion of the JNA 5th Motorized Brigade and charged him with arson for burning 90 houses, businesses and public buildings in Čilipi from 5 to 7 October 1991.

The siege of Dubrovnik was also a subject in Croatia's genocide case against Serbia, before the International Court of Justice (ICJ). Croatia claimed 123 civilians from Dubrovnik were killed during the siege. Croatia presented letters from the Croatian police to support these claims, however, in its 2015 judgment the Court noted that all these letters were prepared much later, specifically for the case, were unsigned, and failed to indicate the circumstances under which the 123 were supposedly killed. The Court noted that other documents prepared by the Dubrovnik Police Department, "although drawn up at the time of the events and not solely for the purposes of this case, they have not been corroborated by evidence from an independent source and appear only to refer to two deaths". Citing the Strugar and Jokić ICTY judgments on Dubrovnik, the ICJ in its own judgment recognized that at least two civilian deaths were caused by the unlawful shelling of Dubrovnik on 6 December and one further on 5 October 1991. The judgement stated that the Court "concludes from the foregoing that it has been established that some killings were perpetrated by the JNA against the Croats of Dubrovnik between October and December 1991, although not on the scale alleged by Croatia".
