= Armed Boats Squadron Dubrovnik =

- Armed Boats Squadron Dubrovnik emblem
- Active: 1991–1992
- Disbanded: 29 December 1992
- Country: Croatia
- Branch: Navy
- Type: Volunteer unit
- Role: Blockade runners
- Size: 117 personnel; 23 boats
- Garrison/HQ: Dubrovnik
- Anniversaries: 6 December
- Engagements: Croatian War of Independence: Siege of Dubrovnik
- Decorations: Order of Nikola Šubić Zrinski

Commanders
- Notable commanders: Lieutenant Colonel Aljoša Nikolić

The Armed Boats Squadron Dubrovnik (Croatian: Odred naoružanih brodova Dubrovnik) was a volunteer unit of the Croatian Navy that ran the naval blockade during the siege of Dubrovnik which formed part of the Croatian War of Independence in 1991–1992. It consisted of 23 vessels, mostly of the runabout type, lightly armed and armoured. The unit was crucial in the defence of Dubrovnik, providing a resupply route for the Dubrovnik population and troops defending the besieged city. Boats assigned to the squadron transported approximately 6,000 troops and civilians, about 100 wounded and 2,000 tonnes of various cargo. A total of 117 personnel served with the squadron during the siege, suffering two fatalities.

The siege of Dubrovnik and the associated blockade running operations of the squadron took place from September 1991 until May 1992, during the peak of the fighting in the Croatian War of Independence. The commencement of the siege preceded the declaration of Croatian independence on 8 October 1991. In early 1992, the Dubrovnik area saw fierce fighting while combat operations largely ceased elsewhere in Croatia following the Sarajevo Agreement of 2 January 1992.

Sveti Vlaho, the first vessel of the squadron, sunk in late 1991, was refloated in 2001 and placed on permanent exhibition in Dubrovnik. In 2006, the squadron was collectively decorated with the Order of Nikola Šubić Zrinski for bravery during the Croatian War of Independence. Surviving squadron members founded a squadron association in 2011 to preserve the heritage of the unit.

== Background ==
The 1990 revolt of the Croatian Serbs was centred on the predominantly Serb-populated areas of the Dalmatian hinterland around the city of Knin, parts of Lika, Kordun, Banovina regions and in eastern Croatian settlements with significant Serb population, and these areas were subsequently declared by the Serbs as the Republic of Serbian Krajina (RSK). The RSK declared its intention to integrate politically with Serbia, and this action was viewed by the Government of Croatia as a rebellion. By March 1991, the conflict had escalated to war—the Croatian War of Independence. In June 1991, Croatia declared its independence as Yugoslavia disintegrated. This was followed by a three-month moratorium on the decision, but the decision came into effect on 8 October.

As the Yugoslav People's Army (JNA) increasingly supported the RSK and the Croatian Police were unable to cope with the situation, the Croatian National Guard (ZNG) was formed in May 1991. The ZNG was renamed the Croatian Army (HV) in November. The development of the Croatian armed forces was hampered by a United Nations (UN) arms embargo introduced in September. The final months of 1991 saw the fiercest fighting of the war, culminating in the Battle of the barracks, the Siege of Dubrovnik, and the Battle of Vukovar. Even though the Sarajevo Agreement led to a ceasefire in most areas of Croatia, the siege and fighting around Dubrovnik continued until May 1992.

== Wartime history ==
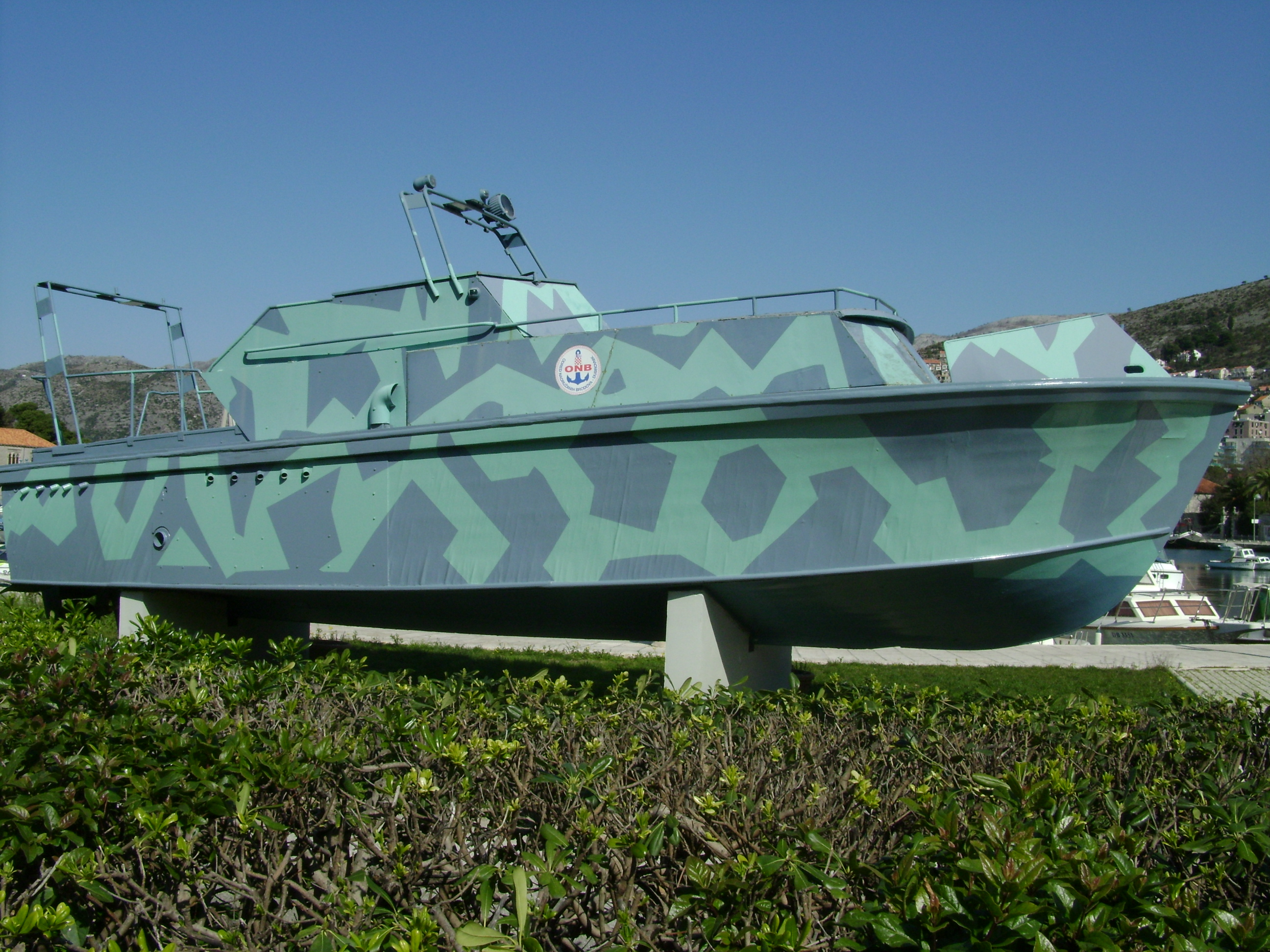
Sveti Vlaho, the first vessel of the Armed Boats Squadron Dubrovnik is on a permanent exhibit in Dubrovnik

The Armed Boats Squadron Dubrovnik was established on 23 September 1991 as a volunteer unit of the Croatian Navy. It served during the Siege of Dubrovnik, and was a key factor in the successful defence of the city. The unit's first commander was Lieutenant Colonel Aljoša Nikolić.

Upon formation, squadron was tasked with breaching the Dubrovnik naval blockade and maintaining a route that was instrumental to delivery of materiel necessary to successfully defend the city, including food, fuel, medical supplies, arms and ammunition. The squadron also transported reinforcements arriving from other parts of Croatia and evacuated wounded out of Dubrovnik, and was a lifeline for the besieged troops and civilian population. Its operations began on 23 September 1991, when the runabout Sveti Vlaho (English: Saint Blaise) undertook its first voyage. The squadron consisted of 23 craft of various sizes and 117 volunteers. Craft armaments were light—the Sveti Vlaho had 6-millimetre (0.24 in) steel plate armour as a protection and a Bren light machine gun. All the vessels of the squadron were relatively fast, the fastest among them being capable of achieving 55 knots (102 kilometres per hour; 63 miles per hour). The squadron typically deployed its craft in pairs or threes, sailing as close as possible to the Yugoslav Navy vessels when passing Koločep island to reach relative safety of the Rijeka Dubrovačka inlet, in order to utilize blind spots of naval guns. During its existence, the squadron runabouts motored more than 52,000 nautical miles (96,000 kilometres; 60,000 miles), and transported approximately 6,000 troops and civilians, about 100 wounded and 2,000 tonnes of various cargo. The unit suffered two combat fatalities.

At dawn on 31 October 1991, the squadron sailed out of Dubrovnik to meet the Libertas convoy—a fleet of civilian vessels, the largest among them being the Jadrolinija shipping line's Slavija, which was endeavoring to deliver humanitarian aid to the city under siege. The fleet sailed from Rijeka and made several port calls, growing to 29 vessels as it approached Dubrovnik. The convoy, accompanied by the last President of Yugoslavia Stjepan Mesić and the Prime Minister of Croatia Franjo Gregurić, was stopped and searched by the Yugoslav Navy off the island of Mljet before the squadron linked up with the convoy and escorted it to Dubrovnik. The event marked the first large delivery of aid to the city since the beginning of the siege.

Dubrovnik on the map of Croatia. RSK and Yugoslav Army-held area near Dubrovnik in early 1992 are highlighted red.

Sveti Vlaho, the first naval vessel to fly the flag of the Republic of Croatia in combat and the first ship of the squadron, was originally an Italian smuggling runabout that was confiscated by the authorities, fitted with armour and used by the squadron in resupply and blockade-running operations. During one of these missions, while sailing back from a trip to Bol on the Croatian island of Brač, she was chased by a Yugoslav gunboat and driven aground on a beach near Babin Kuk, just 2 miles (3.2 kilometres) north of Dubrovnik. Sveti Vlaho was recovered and continued in service until 6 December 1991, when she was sunk at Gruž by a 9K11 Malyutka anti-tank missile. The unit ceased operations in 1992 as the forces besieging Dubrovnik had been defeated. Sveti Vlaho was the second vessel used by the Croatian Navy, preceded only by a landing craft designated DJB-103, which was brought into use eight days earlier. The squadron was disbanded on 29 December 1992.

== Postwar decorations and heritage ==
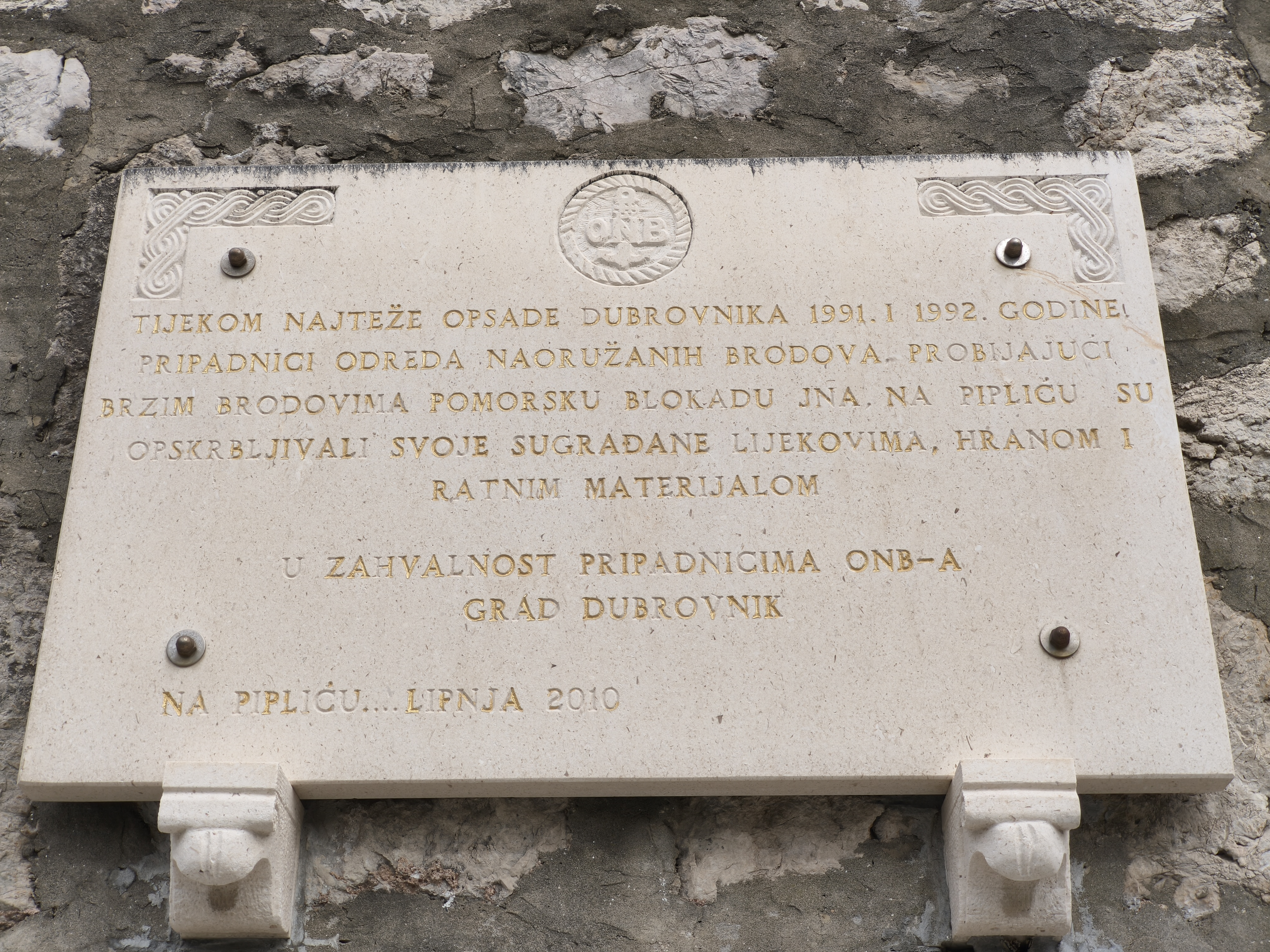
Plaque in Dubrovnik, dedicated to Armed Boats Squadron

Sveti Vlaho was refloated in 2001, restored and put on exhibit in Batala Park in Dubrovnik. In May 2006, the squadron was collectively decorated with the Order of Nikola Šubić Zrinski for the bravery of its members during the Croatian War of Independence; however, no individual decorations were awarded to squadron members, nor were any promoted as a result of their service. On the 15th anniversary of the arrival of the Libertas convoy in besieged Dubrovnik a celebration was held, but no squadron volunteers were invited to attend. On 11 August 2011, surviving members of the squadron founded the Armed Boat Squadron Association whose objective is to preserve the heritage of the squadron, document its contribution to the Croatian War of Independence, and render assistance to its members and other similar associations in Croatia to preserve and promote the role that Croatian soldiers played in achieving the Republic of Croatia's independence.

Unit decorations
Ribbon	Decoration
	Order of Nikola Šubić Zrinski
