= Dubrovnik Republic (1991–1992) =

Serb quasi-state

Dubrovnik Republic Dubrovačka Republika Дубровачка Република
- 1991–1992
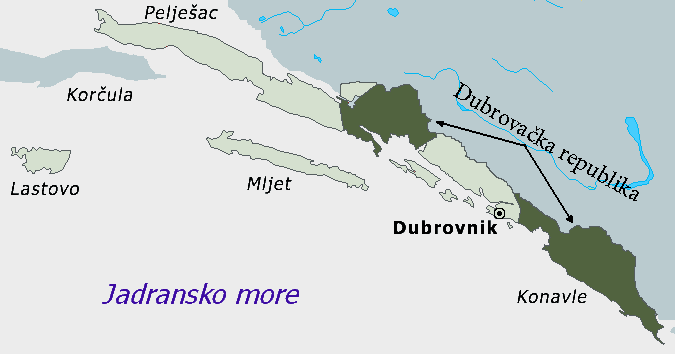
- Status: Quasi-state proclaimed during the Croatian War of Independence
- Capital: Dubrovnik (de jure); Cavtat (de facto)
- Government: Yugoslav People's Army (JNA) military administration
  - President: Aleksandar Aco Apolonio
- Historical era: Yugoslav Wars
  - Capture of Cavtat by JNA forces: 15 October 1991
  - JNA withdrawal and dissolution: 4 May 1992
Preceded by	Succeeded by
SR Croatia	Croatia

The Dubrovnik Republic (Serbian: Dubrovačka Republika; Дубровачка република) was a quasi-state that existed for a short time during the Siege of Dubrovnik in the Croatian War of Independence.

== History ==
The entity was proclaimed by the Serbian-led Yugoslav People's Army on 15 October 1991 in occupied areas of Croatia, after being captured by members of 2nd Corps of the JNA. Its provisional president was Aleksandar Aco Apolonio.

The proclaimed state used effectively the same Serbo-Croatian name as used by the Republic of Ragusa, but its territory did not correspond to the latter's pre-1808 borders from Neum to Prevlaka, including the city of Dubrovnik, rather it only existed in the occupied villages of Cavtat and Konavle.

The International Criminal Tribunal for the former Yugoslavia (ICTY) during the trial of Serbian President Slobodan Milošević, identified the Dubrovnik Republic as being part of several regions in Croatia that Milošević sought to be incorporated into a "Serb-dominated state". The ICTY stated that the JNA's campaign in the Dubrovnik region was aimed at securing territory for this political entity.

In January 1992, Serbian nationalist leader Vojislav Šešelj declared his endorsement of a state that included Serbia, Montenegro, Macedonia, Bosnia and Herzegovina, the Republic of Serbian Krajina, and the Dubrovnik Republic within its borders. Šešelj and his far-right political party Serbian Radical Party endorsed the establishment of the Dubrovnik Republic.

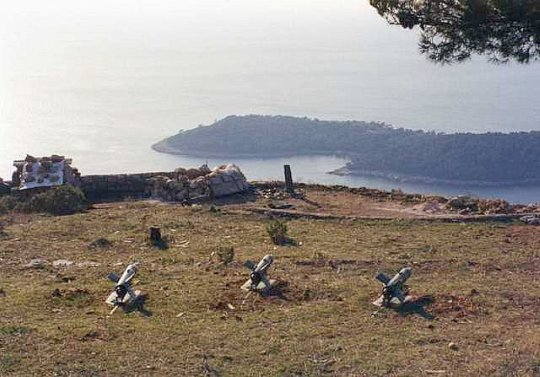
JNA rockets in a position directly across from Dubrovnik in December 1991.

While it was established with JNA assistance, the Serbian government did not issue any statements of support of this government and did not include the republic in their policy discussions. However, the Serbian leadership did desire the incorporation of Dubrovnik into a pan-Serb state, as demonstrated in the diary of Borisav Jović and intercepted communications within Serbian President Slobodan Milošević's inner circle, with the Adriatic border of the pan-Serb state with Croatia being set at the port of Ploče.

The leadership of Yugoslavia's republics of Serbia and Montenegro during the Siege of Dubrovnik had plans to annex Dubrovnik along with the "coastal regions of Croatia between the town of Neum, Bosnia and Herzegovina, in the north-west and the Montenegrin border in the south-east" into Montenegro. As for Ploče, it was decided in November 1991 that the town was to become a territory of Serb-controlled areas of Bosnia and Herzegovina, prior to the Republika Srpska being formed in 1992. Due to the necessity of the use of territory in Bosnia and Herzegovina to launch the invasion of Dubrovnik, Bosnian Serb leader Radovan Karadžić was included in the plans to take Dubrovnik. Days prior to the formation of the Dubrovnik Republic, on 7 October 1991 Karadžić in a telephone conversation said "Dubrovnik needs to be saved for Yugoslavia. Let it be a republic... Some citizens should be found there to decide that when they are liberated". Later that week in a telephone conversation with Gojko Đogo, Karadžić said that Dubrovnik "has to be put under military command and that's it... Dubrovnik was never Croatian!". Đogo responded by declaring that the territory around Dubrovnik needed to be ethnically cleansed, saying: "Burn everything and good bye!... Up north of Rijeka Dubrovačka kill everybody!".

During the Siege of Dubrovnik, Serbian and Montenegrin irregular forces and JNA reservists went on a rampage in Dubrovnik, almost no one was spared in the violence; small villages and farms were plundered, homes and farms were set alight, fires were set to fields and orchards, and livestock was killed. The largely Croat population of Dubrovnik fled in its entirety from the city amid the violence. 82–88 Croatian civilians were killed and around 16,000 Croatian refugees fled.

Although the JNA had agreed to a cease-fire in January 1992, southern Dalmatia south of Ston was still under the occupation of the JNA 2nd Army's Trebinje-Bileća group that was shelling Dubrovnik; JNA involvement officially ended in May 1992, which marked the official dissolution of the republic, and the group was redesignated as the Bosnian Serb Herzegovinian Corps on 4 May 1992. Despite JNA withdrawal, fighting between the Bosnian Serb unit and Croatian army forces continued until 23 October 1992.

== See also ==
- Greater Serbia
- Republic of Serbian Krajina
- Serbs in Dubrovnik
- Operation Jackal (June 1992)
- Operation Tiger (July 1992)
