= Aco Apolonio =

Serbian lawyer and politician

Aleksandar "Aco" Apolonio

1st President of the Dubrovnik Republic
- In office 15 October 1991 – 4 May 1992
- Preceded by: office created
- Succeeded by: office abolished

Personal details
- Born: 11 November 1916 Herceg Novi, Kingdom of Dalmatia, Austria-Hungary (modern Montenegro)
- Died: 2001 (age 84/85) Belgrade, Serbia, FR Yugoslavia

Aleksandar "Aco" Apolonio (Serbian Cyrillic: Александар Ацо Аполонио, sometimes written Apolonijo; 11 November 1916 – 2001) was a Serbian lawyer and politician who became the president of the self-proclaimed Dubrovnik Republic founded in October 1991. Apolonio was a resident of Dubrovnik and had served as a public prosecutor there. He died in Belgrade in 2001.

== Biography ==
Apolonio was born on 11 November 1916 in Kamenari, near Herceg Novi, to an Istrian Italian father and Montenegrin mother from Dubrovnik. In the 1950's, he was the public prosecutor in Dubrovnik.

=== Yugoslav Wars ===
Apolonio became the 1st president of the Dubrovnik Republic, a Serb proto-state during the Siege of Dubrovnik, and the first president of the Movement for the Republic of Dubrovnik. The Yugoslav People's Army (JNA) withdrew from the area in May 1992, officially ending the republic. Apolonio was also sentenced to 12 years in prison in Croatia.
