= Vladimir Kovačević (military officer) =

Montenegrin military officer

- Владимир Ковачевић
- Born: 15 January 1961 (age 65); Nikšić, Socialist Federal Republic of Yugoslavia (modern Montenegro)
- Military career
- Allegiance: Yugoslavia
- Branch: Yugoslav People's Army: Ground Forces
- Rank: Captain (JNA)
- Nickname: "Rambo"
- Unit: Third Battalion of the 472 Motorised Brigade
- Conflicts: Croatian War of Independence; Siege of Dubrovnik

Vladimir Kovačević (Serbian Cyrillic: Владимир Ковачевић; born 15 January 1961), also known as Rambo (Serbian Cyrillic: Рамбо), is a Montenegrin Serb military officer who was charged with the violation of the laws of war by the International Criminal Tribunal for the Former Yugoslavia (ICTY) for his actions in the siege of Dubrovnik during the Croatian War of Independence.

Kovačević faced six counts of violations of the laws of war, all related to the bombing of the UNESCO Heritage Site of Dubrovnik by the Third Battalion of the JNA 472 (Trebinje) Motorised Brigade, of which he was in command.

His case was originally to be processed along with Pavle Strugar, a higher-ranking commander of the operation, but the trial was split up on 26 November 2003.

On 31 January 2005, the International Criminal Tribunal for the former Yugoslavia (ICTY) sentenced Strugar to eight years in prison for his role in the 1991 shelling of Dubrovnik. In 2004 Kovačević was ruled unfit for trial due to mental health problems.

On 30 July 2007, the Serbian Office of the War Crimes Prosecutor announced the indictment of former Yugoslavia Army Captain Vladimir Kovačević for war crimes associated with the 1991 Siege of Dubrovnik.

== Latest developments ==
On 28 October 2004, the Prosecutor requested that the case against Kovačević be referred to Serbia and Montenegro pursuant to Rule 11bis. On 12 April 2006, the Trial Chamber issued a decision that found Kovačević unfit to enter a plea or stand trial, finding that "does not have the capacity to enter a plea and to stand trial, without prejudice to any future criminal proceedings against him should his mental condition change". It was later decided that, if he were ever judged in good enough mental health to stand trial, proceedings would resume. This came after he had previously pleaded insanity.

A referral hearing was held on 15 September 2006, and on 17 November 2006, the Referral Bench ordered that the case against Kovačević be referred to Serbia. On 1 December 2006, the Defence for Kovačević filed a notice of appeal against the decision on the referral.

On 28 March 2007, the Appeals Chamber dismissed the appeal and affirmed the decision to refer the case to the Republic of Serbia. Kovačević was charged by the Republic of Serbia, but a decision was later rendered finding him unfit to stand trial due to reported poor health.

== See also ==
- Bosnian War
- Siege of Dubrovnik
