= Hotel Belvedere (Dubrovnik) =

Former luxury hotel in Dubrovnik, Croatia

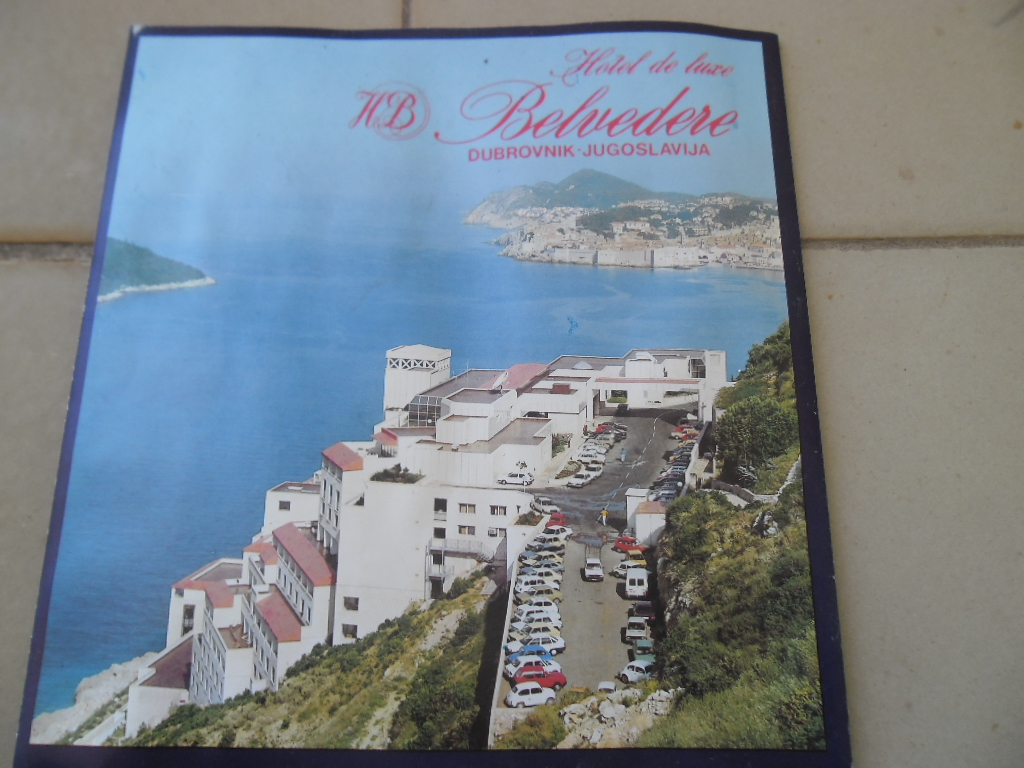
- Hotel Belvedere before the Croatian War of Independence
- Interactive map of the Hotel Belvedere area

General information
- Status: Abandoned
- Type: Hotel
- Location: Sveti Jakov, Dubrovnik, 28 Frana Supila Street, Croatia
- Coordinates: 42.63333°N 18.13222°E
- Construction started: 24 November 1983
- Opened: 26 May 1985
- Closed: 1991
- Owner: Vila Larus d.o.o.

Technical details
- Floor count: 18

Design and construction
- Architects: Julije De Luca, Mirko Bertić and Josip Dumančić
- Architecture firm: Industrijski projektni zavod – OOUR "AR-projekt"

Other information
- Number of units: 210 (1985)

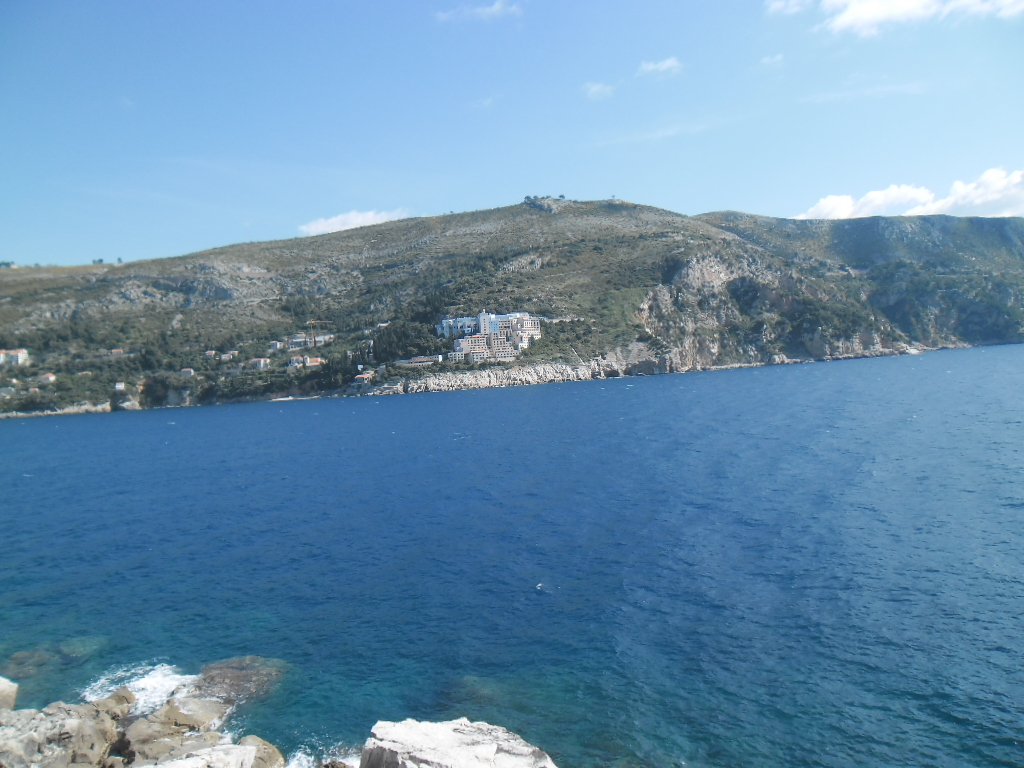
Hotel Belvedere viewed from Lokrum

Hotel Belvedere is a former luxury hotel in Dubrovnik, Croatia, situated on a steep coastal slope in the Sveti Jakov area, east of the city's historic centre. It was designed by Croatian architect Julije De Luca, together with Mirko Bertić and Josip Dumančić of the Zagreb-based Industrijski projektni zavod – OOUR "AR-projekt". The hotel opened on 26 May 1985 as the third de luxe-category hotel in the wider Dubrovnik area.

The complex contained 210 accommodation units with a total of 462 beds. Because of the steep terrain, its large building mass was divided into a series of interconnected volumes descending towards the sea. Architectural studies have variously discussed the hotel in relation to structuralism, critical regionalism and postmodern architecture.

The hotel operated until 1991, when it was heavily damaged by shelling during the Siege of Dubrovnik and part of the complex was destroyed by fire. It was not restored after the war and has remained out of use. The hotel properties were acquired by Vila Larus d.o.o. in 2014. A replacement resort was subsequently designed by Croatian architectural studio 3LHD, but as of September 2026 the existing hotel had not been demolished and construction of the new complex had not begun.

== History ==
=== Earlier development of the site ===
The tourism potential of the Sveti Jakov area had been recognised by the beginning of the 20th century. In 1908, the Syndicate for the Construction and Management of Hotels and Health Resorts in Dalmatia requested a long-term lease of municipal land near the Monastery of St James for the construction of a hotel. The Dubrovnik municipal council approved the request, but the project was not realised because the investor was unable to secure the necessary financing.

A smaller guesthouse named Belvedere was later built on the steep terrain above the coastal cliffs for British citizen Eileen Lewisohn, to a design by Sarajevo builder Mihajlo Blagojević and Rikard Trostman. An annexe was added behind the guesthouse in 1935.

Plans for a substantially larger hotel complex were revived in the second half of the 1970s. The hotel company HTP Dubrovnik entered negotiations with the Cleveland-based company Intertower International over a joint investment, and an early proposal envisaged a luxury hotel with about 700 beds.

In 1981, the Municipal Assembly of Dubrovnik ordered the preparation of the Belvedere–Sveti Jakov implementation plan. Adopted the following year, the plan designated the area between Frana Supila Street and the coast for tourism development and called for an urban-planning and architectural competition.

The proposed development was opposed by some heritage and architectural specialists. Dubrovnik's Institute for the Protection of Cultural Monuments and Nature raised concerns about the scale of the planned complex. Art historian Milan Prelog described the area as one of the last preserved parts of Dubrovnik's natural setting and criticised its conversion to intensive tourist development.

The investor organised an invited architectural competition in 1982. As none of the first-stage proposals fully met the programme and planning requirements, several entrants were asked to develop their designs further. In July 1983, the proposal by Julije De Luca, Mirko Bertić and Josip Dumančić was selected as the basis for further development, subject to modifications.

Construction began on 24 November 1983 with the extension of Frana Supila Street.

== Architecture ==
=== Site and layout ===
Belvedere was built south of the historic Benedictine complex of St James, on a steep site between the extension of Frana Supila Street and the Adriatic coast.

According to the main design documentation, the slope of the site was approximately 37–40 degrees. The architects identified several principal design constraints: the hotel's prominent position in views from the old city, the large volume required by the programme, exposure to southerly and south-easterly winds, and the intention to retain existing vegetation.

The main architectural concept was based on dividing the required building mass into smaller volumes arranged in terraces down the slope. Although the concept was modified during the design process, this remained the defining spatial characteristic of the completed complex.

The complex had 18 levels divided among several spatial and functional sections. Public, food-and-beverage, administrative and service facilities were concentrated primarily in the upper part of the site along Frana Supila Street, while the accommodation wings descended towards the south and east. The western section contained indoor and outdoor swimming pools and sun terraces.

At the time of opening, the hotel contained 210 accommodation units with a total of 462 beds. In addition to guest accommodation, it included several restaurants and bars, conference and entertainment facilities, retail and service spaces, swimming pools and numerous terraces.

The lower part of the complex was linked to a seaside promenade with additional hospitality facilities and an amphitheatre. In 1986, a bathing area designed by Mato Kortizija was constructed on the rocks south of the hotel.

=== Design and architectural reception ===
The hotel's structure consisted predominantly of reinforced-concrete walls, slabs and frame systems, while a metal structure spanned the indoor swimming pool.

De Luca sought to reduce the visual impact of the complex by dividing it into smaller interconnected volumes. A particularly prominent feature was the vertical circulation tower, which the project documentation described as evoking a Romanesque tower through its form and materials, thereby establishing a visual association with Mediterranean architecture.

The façades combined white stone, stone-textured render, large glazed surfaces, reddish aluminium panels and other contemporary materials. Flat roofs and terraces on the accommodation wings were partly surfaced with dark-red ceramic material. Reflective glazing was used in parts of the public areas so that the surrounding sky and vegetation were reflected in the façades.

Architectural interpretations of Belvedere have differed. Andrija Mutnjaković classified it, together with De Luca's Kristal and Diamant hotels in Poreč, among the architect's structuralist works. Zlatko Tot identified both structuralist and regionalist principles in the design and discussed it in relation to critical regionalism, while Božo Benić interpreted the hotel in the context of postmodern hotel architecture, particularly its fragmentation of building volumes, metaphorical use of elements associated with Mediterranean architecture, and combination of traditional and contemporary materials.

Architect Ivan Štraus praised the way in which De Luca distributed the building along the steep coastline, creating the impression of a fragmented and dispersed mass. Art historian Duško Kečkemet likewise identified Belvedere as one of the more noteworthy examples of Dubrovnik's tourist architecture of the 1980s because of its division into smaller building units distributed over the steep terrain, although he criticised the scale of hotel development in Dubrovnik during the period.

The later Detailed Development Plan for Belvedere took a more critical view of the building's relationship with its surroundings, stating that despite the fragmentation of its volumes, from distant viewpoints the complex was still perceived as a large irregular mass dominating the site.

== Operation and wartime destruction ==
Belvedere officially opened on 26 May 1985. Contemporary sources described it as among the most luxurious and best-equipped hotels in Yugoslavia. Its location and facilities also enabled it to host conferences and other events.

In the early 1990s, following the break-up of the former HTP Dubrovnik organisation, the hotel became part of the newly established Hotelsko-turističko poduzeće "Belvedere".

During the Siege of Dubrovnik in late 1991, the hotel was heavily damaged by shelling and part of the complex was destroyed by fire. It was not subsequently returned to operation. During the following decades, the abandoned complex was affected by vandalism, removal of its furnishings and progressive deterioration.

== Post-war ownership ==
After the war, HTP Belvedere entered the process of ownership transformation and privatisation. Belvedere d.d. was established in 1995, and substantial shareholdings were subsequently held by INA and privatisation funds. The Croatian State Audit Office later identified irregularities in parts of the ownership-transformation process. INA Turizam concluded an agreement for the repair and reconstruction of the hotel in 1995. Some work was carried out, but the reconstruction was never completed and the hotel did not reopen.

In the early 2000s, a controlling stake passed to private investors. By 2008, the Panamanian company Cleostone Corporation, associated with Croatian-British businessman Zvonko Stojević, was reported as the majority shareholder, while INA retained a substantial minority holding. Cleostone announced plans for a reconstruction valued at approximately €50 million, but the project was not realised.

After a loan secured against the hotel properties was not repaid, INA initiated enforcement proceedings and a sale of the properties in 2010. Bankruptcy proceedings against Belvedere d.d. were opened in July 2012.

The first public auction of the hotel properties in 2013 was postponed because of questions concerning the maritime domain, while a subsequent auction attracted no bidders.

At a renewed auction on 9 May 2014, the sole bidder was Vila Larus d.o.o., which purchased the hotel properties for €12.2 million. Contemporary sources linked Vila Larus with Russian businessman Viktor Vekselberg.

The sale transferred the hotel properties to Vila Larus, rather than the shares of Belvedere d.d. The company itself continued to exist in bankruptcy until the proceedings were concluded in 2022.

== Redevelopment proposals ==
=== 2013 development plan ===
In 2013, the Dubrovnik City Council adopted the Detailed Development Plan for Belvedere, which provided for demolition of the existing hotel and construction of a new hotel complex. The plan permitted a hotel of up to 300 rooms, parking facilities, a concert hall and conference facilities.

A subsequent heritage impact assessment, later reviewed by the ICOMOS, considered the amount of construction permitted by the plan excessive in relation to the sensitivity of the site and the setting of Dubrovnik's historic centre.

=== 3LHD proposal ===
Following the change of ownership in 2014, work began on a new concept for the hotel complex. In early 2015, representatives of the investor presented plans for a smaller terraced luxury development incorporating villas and requested amendments to the existing planning documents.

A private, two-stage international invited architectural competition was held for the new hotel. In June 2016, the proposal by Zagreb architectural studio 3LHD was selected as the winning design.

The project called for removal of the existing high-rise structures and their replacement with a substantially lower and more fragmented five-star resort. According to the proposal assessed during the heritage impact process, the complex would have approximately 28,000 m^{2} (300,000 sq ft) of gross floor area and around 270 beds. It would consist of an entrance and reception pavilion, a main hotel building, a funicular and seven hotel villas, with the principal buildings no more than six storeys high. The design placed particular emphasis on landscaping the site and adapting the building volumes to the existing topography.

To allow the project to proceed, the City of Dubrovnik began the process of amending its spatial plan and general urban plan in 2016, together with the proposed repeal of the 2013 Detailed Development Plan for Belvedere.

A public consultation on the planning amendments was held in 2017. City authorities stated at the time that demolition of the old hotel could begin by the end of 2017 and that the new complex could be completed by 2020, but neither timetable was met.

=== ICOMOS review and planning delays ===
A heritage impact assessment was prepared as part of the redevelopment project and reviewed by ICOMOS in 2018. Its technical review concluded that, provided the proposed mitigation measures were implemented, the 3LHD project would have a slightly positive overall effect on the setting of the World Heritage property of the Old City of Dubrovnik. Among the improvements identified in comparison with the existing hotel were its smaller volume, closer adaptation to the site's topography and more extensive landscaping.

ICOMOS also stated that appropriate amendments to the planning documents and other planning and conservation requirements would have to be completed before the project could proceed.

The planning process was not completed. In subsequent years, the unresolved delineation of the maritime domain was also cited as an obstacle to redevelopment. As of September 2026, the 2013 Detailed Development Plan for Belvedere remained listed among the planning documents on the official website of the City of Dubrovnik.

The hotel properties remained owned by Vila Larus. In 2024, representatives of the investor stated that they intended to retain the site's hotel use and pursue a development based on 3LHD's 2016 design, while identifying planning documentation and the maritime-domain issue as the principal obstacles.

According to publicly available company information, the sole shareholder of Vila Larus d.o.o. was the Swiss company ACRUMEN AG. As of September 2026, demolition of the old hotel and construction of the replacement complex had not begun.
