= Libertas convoy =

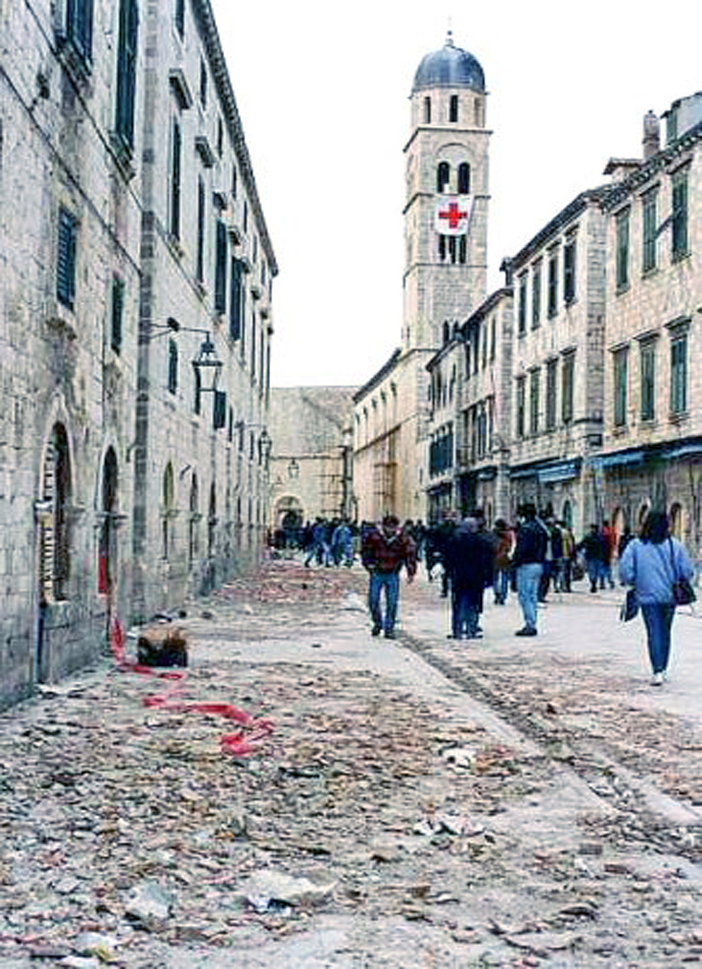
Stradun Street during the siege

Libertas convoy (Croatian: Konvoj Libertas) was a partly grassroots humanitarian action aimed at breaking through Yugoslav People's Army's naval blockade of the Croatian city of Dubrovnik during the Croatian War of Independence and the siege of Dubrovnik in 1991. The purpose of the convoy was to bring supplies to Dubrovnik's inhabitants who, in connection with the siege, were living without electricity and access to fresh drinking water, food and medicine. The convoy's name 'Libertas' alludes to the Latin word for freedom which is the historical motto of Dubrovnik.

== Background ==
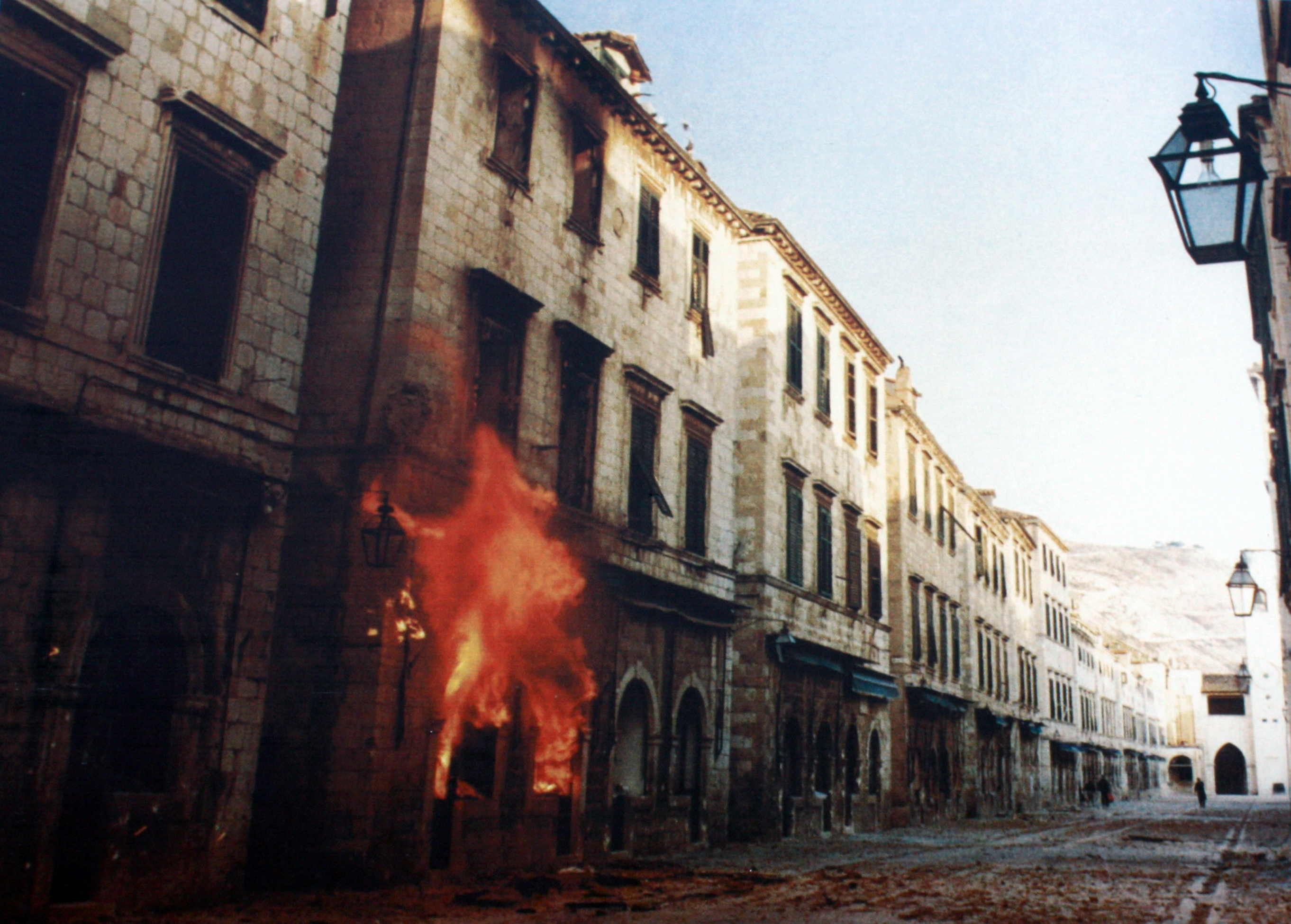
Shelling of the Old Town

On October 1, 1991, Yugoslav People's Army (JNA), then made up of Serbian and Montenegrin units, attacked Dubrovnik from land, sea and air, and by late October had captured virtually all of the land between the Pelješac and Prevlaka peninsulas on the coast of the Adriatic Sea, with the exception of Dubrovnik itself. The siege was accompanied by a Yugoslav Navy (JRM) blockade. The JNA's bombardment of Dubrovnik culminated on 6 December 1991 which provoked international condemnation. As a result of the blockade, approximately 50,000 citizens in Dubrovnik lived without electricity and access to enough fresh drinking water, food and medicine.

== The beginning ==
In October 1991 in Zagreb, the Dubrovnik Salvation Fund Sveti Vlaho, the Croatian Writers' Association and Matica hrvatska launched an initiative to break through the naval blockade and deliver the necessary humanitarian assistance to the people of Dubrovnik. The idea behind the action was to bring together as many vessels as possible, break through the blockade and sail into the port of Gruž. Rijeka become an organizational and logistical center for collecting assistance.

== The action ==
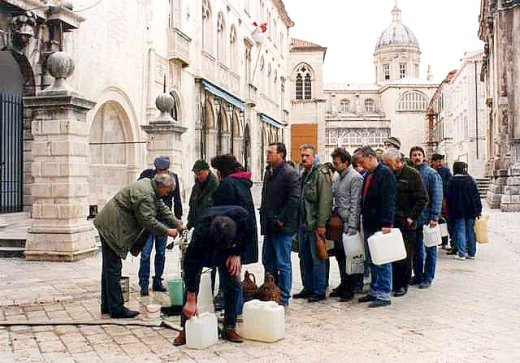
People queue at a water pipe during the siege

On October 28, 1991, the convoy sailed from Rijeka and made several port calls, growing to 29 civilian vessels (tourist boats, sailboats, tugboats, etc.), the largest being Jadrolinija's ferry Slavija, as it approached Dubrovnik. The convoy carried European Community Monitor Mission observers, protesters, and a number of politicians, journalists, cultural figures including Veljko Bulajic and politicians, including the President of the Presidency of Yugoslavia Stjepan Mesić and the Prime Minister of Croatia Franjo Gregurić. On October 30, at around one o'clock in the morning, the convoy reached Korčula. A day earlier, Dubrovnik amateur radio operators intercepted JRM's messages in which the 9th VPS Boka Command requested for a convoy to be stopped and searched. The convoy's journey towards Dubrovnik proceeded unimpeded up until it reached the Elaphiti Islands where it was stopped by the Yugoslav frigate JRM Split between the islands of Brač and Šolta. JRM representatives demanded all vessels to return and Slavia to dock in the Montenegrin port of Zelenika, After lengthy negotiations and the thorough search of the vessels, the convoy was allowed to continue its journey towards Dubrovnik.

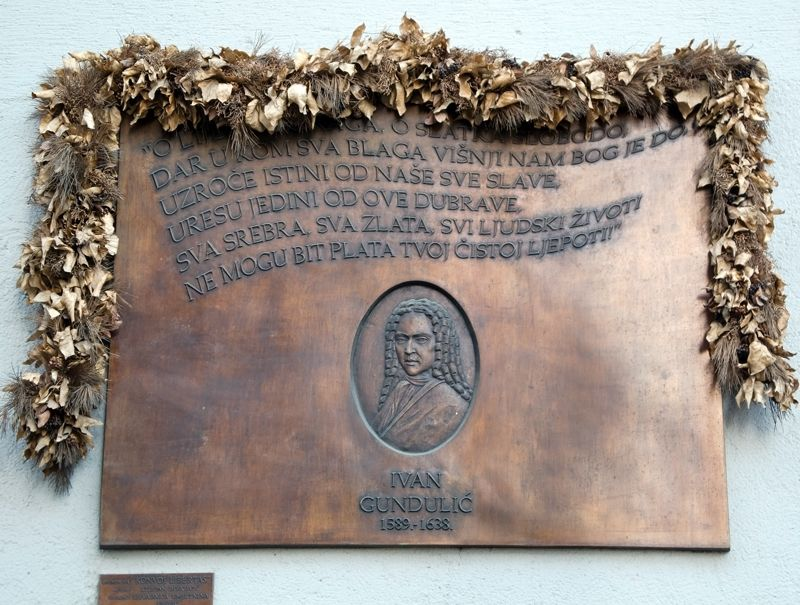
Memorial plaque of the Libertas Convoy in Zagreb's Ivan Gundulić Street, a street named after Croatian poet from Dubrovnik

In the early morning hours of October 31, 1991, speedboats of the Armed Boats Squadron Dubrovnik sailed from the port of Gruž to meet the Convoy and escorted all 29 vessels into the harbor where about 1,000 Dubrovnik residents welcomed them. During his speech, president Stjepan Mesić stated that the people of Dubrovnik have not been forgotten. After a long 30 days, the much-awaited assistance arrived in the city. On its return, the 700-capacity Slavija evacuated 2,000 refugees from Dubrovnik, although she had to sail to the Bay of Kotor first for inspection by the Yugoslav Navy.

The Libertas convoy was primarily a humanitarian campaign but it also sent an important political message. Journalists who documented the humanitarian disaster that arose in Dubrovnik in connection with the city's siege caused a public relations disaster for Serbia and Montenegro, contributing to their further diplomatic and economic isolation, as well as the international recognition of Croatia's independence. In Croatia, it conveyed a picture of solidarity and consensus among the Croatian citizens.
