= Pavle Strugar =

Montenegrin war criminal

- Born: 13 July 1933; Peć, Kingdom of Yugoslavia (modern Serbia)
- Died: 12 December 2018 (aged 85); Belgrade
- Military career
- Allegiance: Yugoslavia
- Service years: 1960–1993
- Rank: General (JNA); Yugoslav Navy

Pavle Strugar (Serbian Cyrillic: Павле Стругар; 13 July 1933 – 12 December 2018) was a Montenegrin general in the Yugoslav People's Army (JNA) who was found guilty of war crimes by the International Criminal Tribunal for the former Yugoslavia (ICTY) for his role in the siege of Dubrovnik.

== Biography ==
Strugar was born 13 July 1933 in Peć, Kingdom of Yugoslavia (modern-day Serbia). During the Croatian War of Independence, he was made commander of the JNA's Second Operational Group in October 1991, which operated in southern Croatia. In this role, he commanded the JNA's forces which laid siege to Dubrovnik, including its historic Old Town. The siege lasted until May 1992. Strugar retired in 1993.

In 2001, the International Tribunal for the Former Yugoslavia (ICTY) charged Strugar on several counts. These included violations of the customs of war and attacks on the UNESCO heritage site of the Old Town. Strugar voluntarily surrendered to the court at the Hague, becoming the first Serbian or Montenegrin citizen to do so. In January 2005, he was found guilty of attacks on civilians and destruction or damage to cultural and historical monuments in the Old Town and sentenced to 8 years in prison. Strugar initially appealed his sentence, but later withdrew the appeal citing poor health.

In exchange, the court withdrew appeals of its own against Strugar. On 17 July 2008, his sentence was reduced to seven and one half years imprisonment on compassionate grounds due to his deteriorating health. On 16 January 2009, the ICTY granted Strugar early release. In the appeal judgement, he was found guilty of attacks on civilians; destruction or willful damage done to institutions dedicated to religion, charity and education, the arts and sciences, historic monuments and works of art and science; devastation not justified by military necessity; and unlawful attacks on civilian objects.

He died in Belgrade on 12 December 2018 at the age of 85.

== See also ==
- Miodrag Jokić
