= Morinj camp =

Montenegrin detention facility

The Morinj camp (Logor Morinj) was a detention facility near Kotor, Montenegro (then part of SFR Yugoslavia, later FR Yugoslavia) where Croatian prisoners of war and civilians were kept by Montenegrin authorities in the Yugoslav People's Army during the Croatian War of Independence. The age of the incarcerated ranged from 15 to 82. Former captives are organized into the Association of Morinj Prisoners.

The camp was opened in autumn of 1991. Approximately 300 people were held here.

In 2006 the County Court of Dubrovnik began an investigation of possible war crimes at the camp. Montenegro brought to trial six former Yugoslav People's Army soldiers, who were guards at the camp, for war crimes. On May 15, 2010 the court brought down its ruling, finding all six men guilty and delivering prison sentences between one and a half to four years.

A documentary film about the camp was made by Montenegrin author Marko Stojanović.
