= Serbia in the Yugoslav Wars =

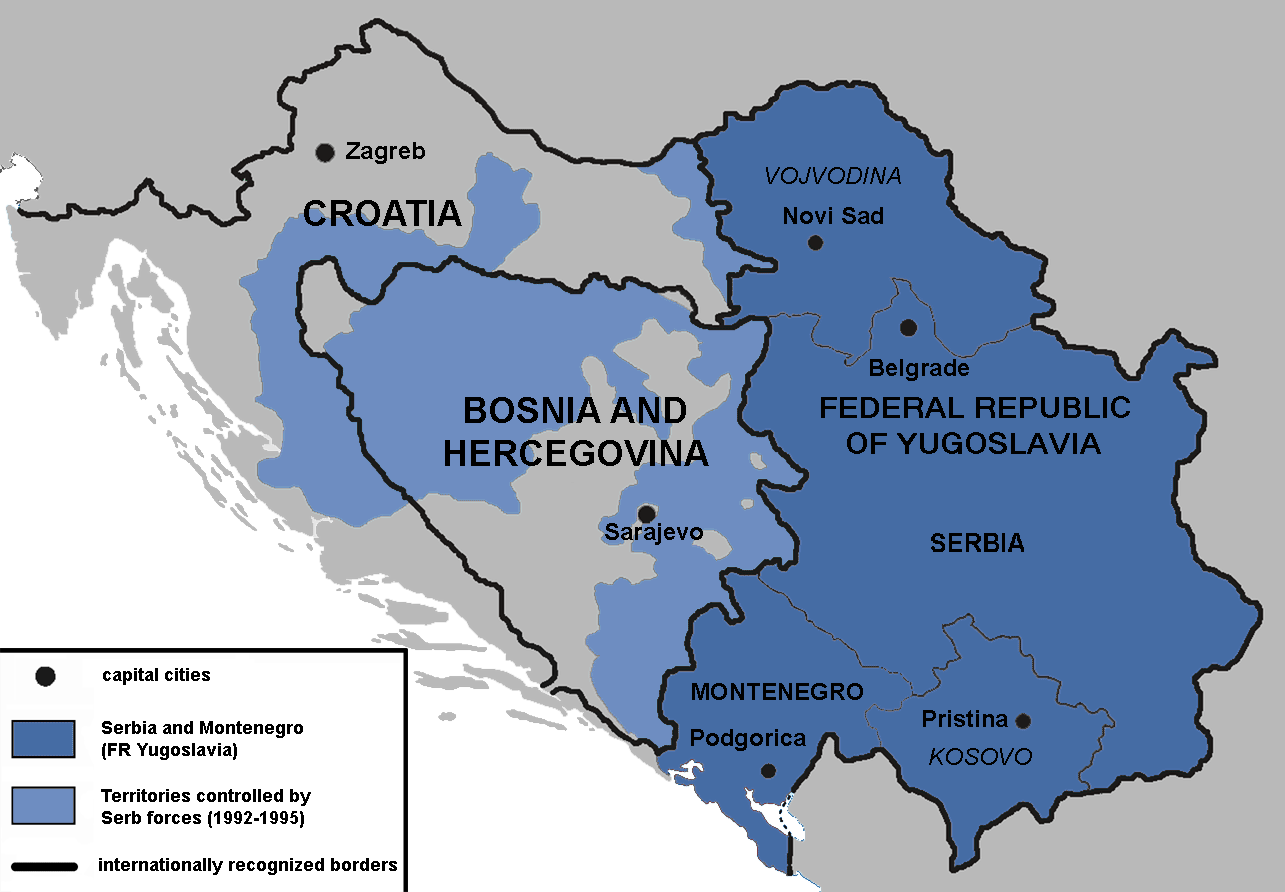
Territories of the Republic of Bosnia and Herzegovina and the Republic of Croatia controlled by the Bosnian and Croatian Serb forces, after Operation Corridor (July 1992)

Serbia, as a constituent subject of the SFR Yugoslavia and later the FR Yugoslavia, was involved in the Yugoslav Wars, which took place between 1991 and 1999—the war in Slovenia, the Croatian War of Independence, the Bosnian War, and Kosovo. From 1991 to 1997, Slobodan Milošević was the President of Serbia. The International Criminal Tribunal for the former Yugoslavia (ICTY) has established that Milošević was in control of Serb forces in Bosnia and Herzegovina and Croatia during the wars which were fought there from 1991 to 1995.

Accused of supporting Serb rebels in Croatia and Bosnia, the Federal Republic of Yugoslavia was suspended from most international organisations and institutions, and economic and political sanctions were imposed, which resulted in an economic disaster and massive emigration from the country. The NATO bombing of Yugoslavia during the Kosovo War significantly damaged the country's infrastructure and economy. After the Yugoslav Wars, Serbia became home to the highest number of refugees and internally displaced persons in Europe.

Emblem of Serbia during the war

Various judicial proceedings at the ICTY have investigated the different levels of responsibility of the Yugoslav People's Army and the leadership of the FRY and Serbia for the war crimes that were committed by ethnic Serbs who lived in other republics of the former Yugoslavia, while the government of Serbia was tasked with apprehending numerous ethnic Serb fugitives for the Tribunal, with which it largely complied. Milošević became the first sitting head of state to be charged with war crimes.

Following Milošević's rise to power and the outbreak of the Yugoslav Wars, numerous anti-war movements developed in Serbia. It is estimated that between 50,000 and 200,000 people deserted from the Yugoslav People's Army, while between 100,000 and 150,000 people emigrated from Serbia after refusing to participate in the war. Milošević regime's propaganda played a significant role in the wars.

After the defeat of Milošević's party at the 1996 local elections, the 1996–97 anti-government protests, and the boycott of the 1997 election by the opposition due to irregular election conditions, the wide opposition alliance won the 2000 election. That led to the overthrow of Slobodan Milošević, resulting in the admission of the FR Yugoslavia United Nations membership, the arrest of Milošević and extradition to stand trial for war crimes.

== Background ==
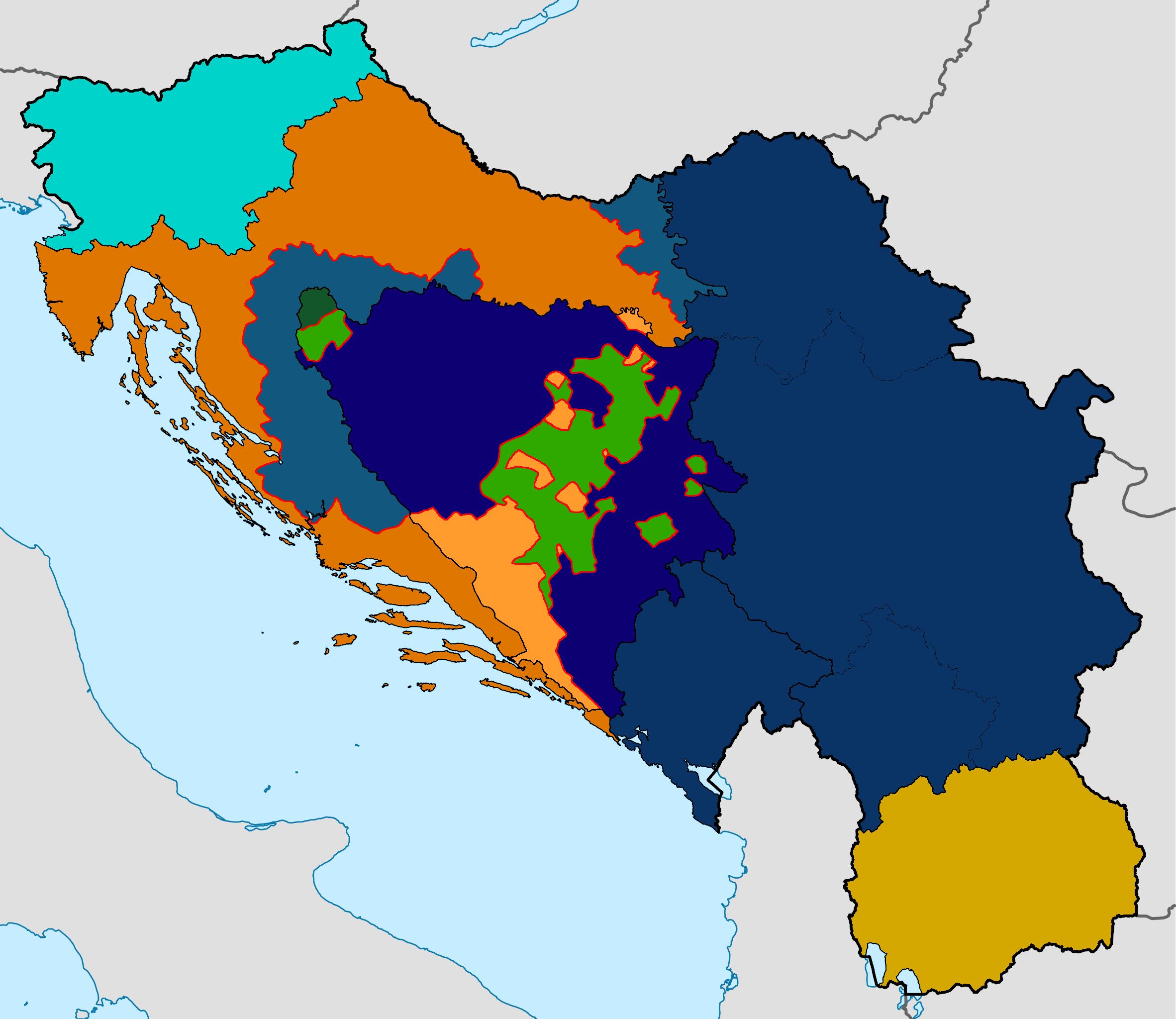
Map of the frontlines, late 1993.

The 1990 survey conducted among Yugoslav citizens showed that ethnic animosity existed on a small scale. Compared to the results from 25 years before, Serbia was one of the republic with the smallest increase in ethnic distance, which stayed at medium. There was significant increase of ethnic distance among Serbs and Montenegrins toward Croats and Slovenes and vice versa. Of all respondents, 71% of Serbs said that their affiliation with Yugoslavia is very important to them.

Milošević used a rigid control of the media to organize a propaganda campaign in which the thesis that Serbs were the victims and the need for readjust Yugoslavia to redress the alleged bias against Serbia. This then was then followed by Milošević's anti-bureaucratic revolution in which the governments of Vojvodina, Kosovo and Montenegro were overthrown, which gave Milošević the dominating position of 4 votes out of 8 in Yugoslavia's collective presidency.

The Constitution of Yugoslavia (1974 Constitution), in its Basic Principles, in the very beginning, stated "The peoples of Yugoslavia, starting from the right of every nation to self-determination, including the right to secession,...". The opinion of the Serb leadership of that time was that the internal borders of Yugoslavia were provisional. The basis for this statement was derived from the Constitution of Yugoslavia. President Slobodan Milošević, also the leader of the Socialist Party of Serbia, had repeatedly stated that all Serbs should enjoy the right to be included in Serbia. Mihajlo Marković, the Vice President of the Main Committee of Serbia's Socialist Party, rejected any solution that would make Serbs outside Serbia a minority. He proposed establishing a federation consisting of Serbia, Montenegro, BiH, Macedonia and Serbs residing in the Serbian Autonomous Region of Krajina, Slavonia, Baranja, and Srem.

Slovenia and Croatia declared independence on 25 June 1991. Both were internationally recognized on 15 January 1992. Bosnia and Herzegovina declared independence on 5 March 1992. It was internationally recognized on 22 May 1992 by the United Nations. With the collapse of the Socialist Federal Republic of Yugoslavia, Serbia and Montenegro proclaimed the Federal Republic of Yugoslavia as a sole successor state of SFR Yugoslavia, on 27 April 1992. It remained unrecognized during the conflict.

=== Serb media under Milošević ===
The Serbian media during the Milošević era was known to espouse Serb nationalism while promoting xenophobia toward the other ethnicities in Yugoslavia. Ethnic Albanians were commonly characterised in the media as anti-Yugoslav counter-revolutionaries, rapists, and a threat to the Serb nation. When war erupted in Croatia, Politika promoted Serb nationalism, hostility towards Croatia, and violence.

On 5 June 1991, Politika ekspres ran a piece titled "Serbs must get weapons". On 25 June 1991 and 3 July 1991, Politika began to openly promote partitioning Croatia, and prominently quoted Jovan Marjanović of the Serbian Renewal Movement, who said "The [Yugoslav] Army must come into Croatia and occupy the line Benkovac-Karlovac-Pakrac-Baranja". On 25 June 1991, Politika reminded Serbs about the atrocities perpetrated by the Croatian fascist Ustaše against Serbs during World War II; "Jasenovac [an Ustaše concentration camp in World War II] mustn't be forgotten".

Serbian state media during the wars featured controversial reportage that villainized the other ethnic factions. In one such program, a Croatian Serb woman denounced the old "communist policy" in Croatia, claiming that under it "[t]he majority of Serbs would be assimilated in ten years", while another interviewee stated "Where Serbian blood was shed by Ustasha knives, there will be our boundaries." Various Serbian state television reports featured Jovan Rašković, who stated the Croatian people had a "genocidal nature".

The director of Radio Television of Serbia during Milošević's era, Dušan Mitević, later admitted, in a PBS documentary, that "the things that happened at state TV, warmongering, things we can admit to now: false information, biased reporting. That went directly from Milošević to the head of TV".

== Armed conflicts ==
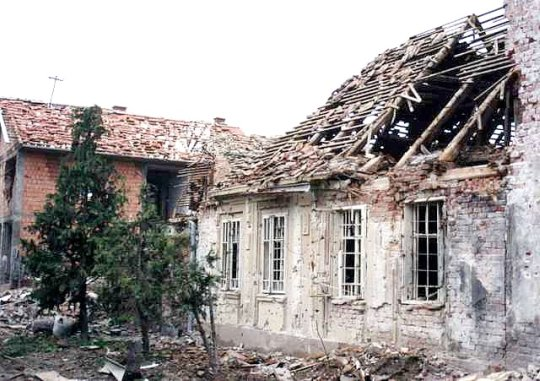
Ruins in Vukovar in November 1991 after the JNA invasion.

During the Yugoslav wars of the 1990s, the concept of a Greater Serbia was widely seen outside of Serbia as the motivating force for the military campaigns undertaken to form and sustain Serbian states on the territories of the breakaway Yugoslav republics of Croatia (the Republic of Serbian Krajina) and Bosnia and Herzegovina (the Republika Srpska). The goal of the Republic of Serbia was to play the role of a central power left vacant by the fading federal state.

=== Serbia's role in the Slovenian war ===
As early as June 1990, after the success of pro-independence forces in the referendums of Slovenia and Croatia, there was a meeting between Slobodan Milosevic, Yugoslav Defence Minister General Veljko Kadijević and Serb representative to the Yugoslav Presidency Borisav Jović where they drew a plan by which Serbia would "throw Slovenia and Croatia out of Yugoslavia" through the use of force and occupy areas of Croatia where the Serbs were majority.

Milošević wanted to force a political deal with Slovene president Milan Kučan; Serbia would recognize the right of the self-determination of the Slovene nation to independence if Slovenia in turn recognized the right of self-determination of the Serb nation to remain united with Serbia. Such a deal would have set a precedent for Serbs in Bosnia and Croatia to remain in one state with Serbia.

Immediately after the Slovenian independence referendum, the Yugoslav People's Army (JNA) announced a new defence doctrine that would apply across the country. The socialist doctrine of "General People's Defence", in which each republic maintained a Territorial Defence Force (TO), was to be replaced by a centrally-directed system of defence. The republics would lose their role in defence matters, and their TOs would be disarmed and subordinated to JNA headquarters in Belgrade. The Slovenian government resisted these moves, and successfully ensured that the majority of Slovenian Territorial Defence equipment was kept out of the hands of the JNA.

General Veljko Kadijević was de facto commander of Yugoslav People's Army during the Slovenian Independence War. Kadijević advocated for a show of force that would convince the Slovenian government to back down on its declaration of independence. After some debate, Kadijević got his way. The officer corps was dominated by Serbs and Montenegrins. The rank and file troops however were conscripts, many who had no strong motivation in fighting against the Slovenes. Of the soldiers of the 5th Military District, which was in action in Slovenia, about 30% were Albanians. Milošević's government was not particularly concerned about Slovenia's independence, as there was no significant Serb minority in the country. On 30 June, Kadijević suggested to the Yugoslav federal presidency to resume action on Slovenia with a massive attack to break down the unexpectedly heavy resistance. But Borisav Jović, shocked the military establishment by declaring that Serbia did not support further use of force against Slovenia.

=== Serbia's role in the Croatian war ===
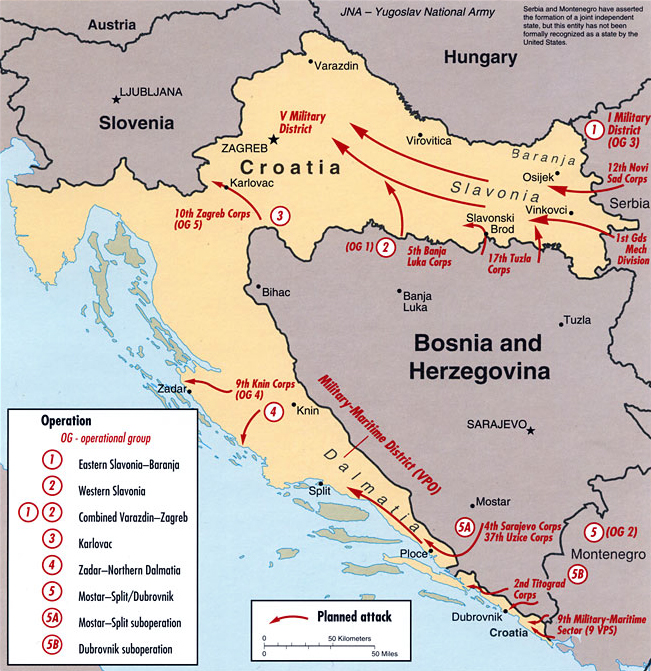
Map of the strategic offensive plan of the Yugoslav People's Army (JNA) in Croatia, 1991. The JNA was unable to advance as far as planned due to Croatian resistance and mobilization problems.

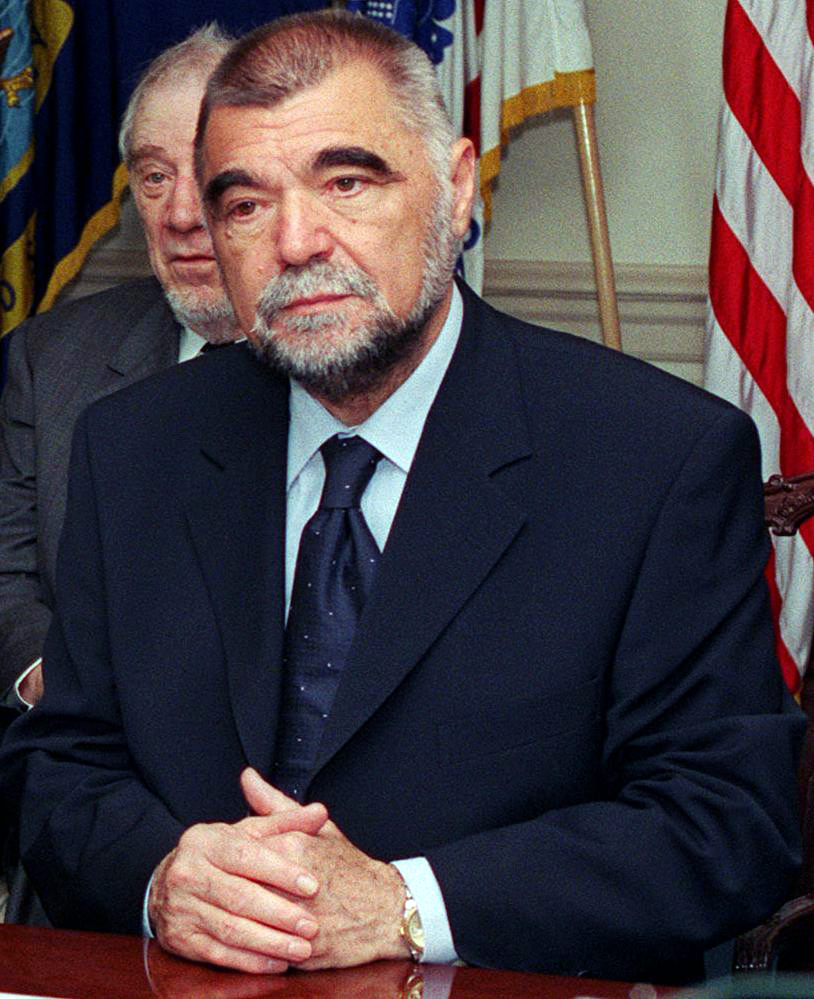
Blagoje Adžić, Colonel General, and Veljko Kadijević (right), Minister of Defence of the Yugoslav People's Army (JNA), were constitutionally under the supreme command of the president of Yugoslavia. However, in 1991, when the war in Croatia broke out, Adžić and Kadijević refused to accept the authority of president Stjepan Mesić (left), a Croat, and instead followed instructions from Milošević and Borisav Jović.

Milošević believes he now has the historic opportunity to, once and for all, settle accounts with the Croats and do what Serbian politicians after World War I did not – rally all Serbs in one Serbian state.

— Belgrade newspaper Borba, August 1991.

In April 1991, Serbs within the Republic of Croatia moved to secede from that territory, which itself seceded from Yugoslavia.

In May 1991, Stipe Mesić, a Croat, was scheduled to be the chairman of the rotating Presidency of the Socialist Federal Republic of Yugoslavia, but Serbia blocked his installation, so this maneuver technically left Yugoslavia without a leader.

In various verdicts, the International Criminal Tribunal for the former Yugoslavia (ICTY) concluded that Krajina presidents Milan Babić and Milan Martić were cooperating with Serbia's president Milošević who sent ammunition, financial assistance and the JNA and Serb paramilitary as back up during 1991 and 1992 in order to take over large chunks of Croatia. After the United Nations imposed sanctions against Serbia, the JNA formally withdrew from Croatia by May 1992. However, in the 2011 verdict regarding Momčilo Perišić, the ICTY established that Belgrade was, through the 30th and 40th Personnel Centre, still supplying armies of Krajina and Republika Srpska all until 1995, despite international sanctions. In the judgement, the judges ruled that members of the Yugoslav Army served under banners of Serbian Army of Krajina (SVK) and VRS, but received pensions, salaries, benefits and promotions directly from Belgrade. Although Perišić did not have effective control over the VRS, he had control of the SVK, but failed to sanction them for the Zagreb rocket attacks.

=== Serbia's role in the Bosnian war ===
During the Bosnian war, it was a part of the strategic plan of the Serb leadership, which aimed to link Serb-populated areas in Bosnia and Herzegovina, in order to gain control over these areas and create a separate Serb state, from which most non-Serbs would be permanently removed. The Serb leadership was aware that its strategic plan could only be implemented by the use of force and fear, such as the commission of war crimes.

The Bosnian Serb Army was "under the overall control" of Belgrade and the Yugoslav Army, which meant that they had funded, equipped and assisted the coordination and planning of military operations. The Army of Republika Srpska arose from the Yugoslav army forces in Bosnia and Herzegovina. Despite sanctions, Belgrade was still the main source of soldiers, ammunition, spare parts and financial assistance for Republika Srpska until 1995.

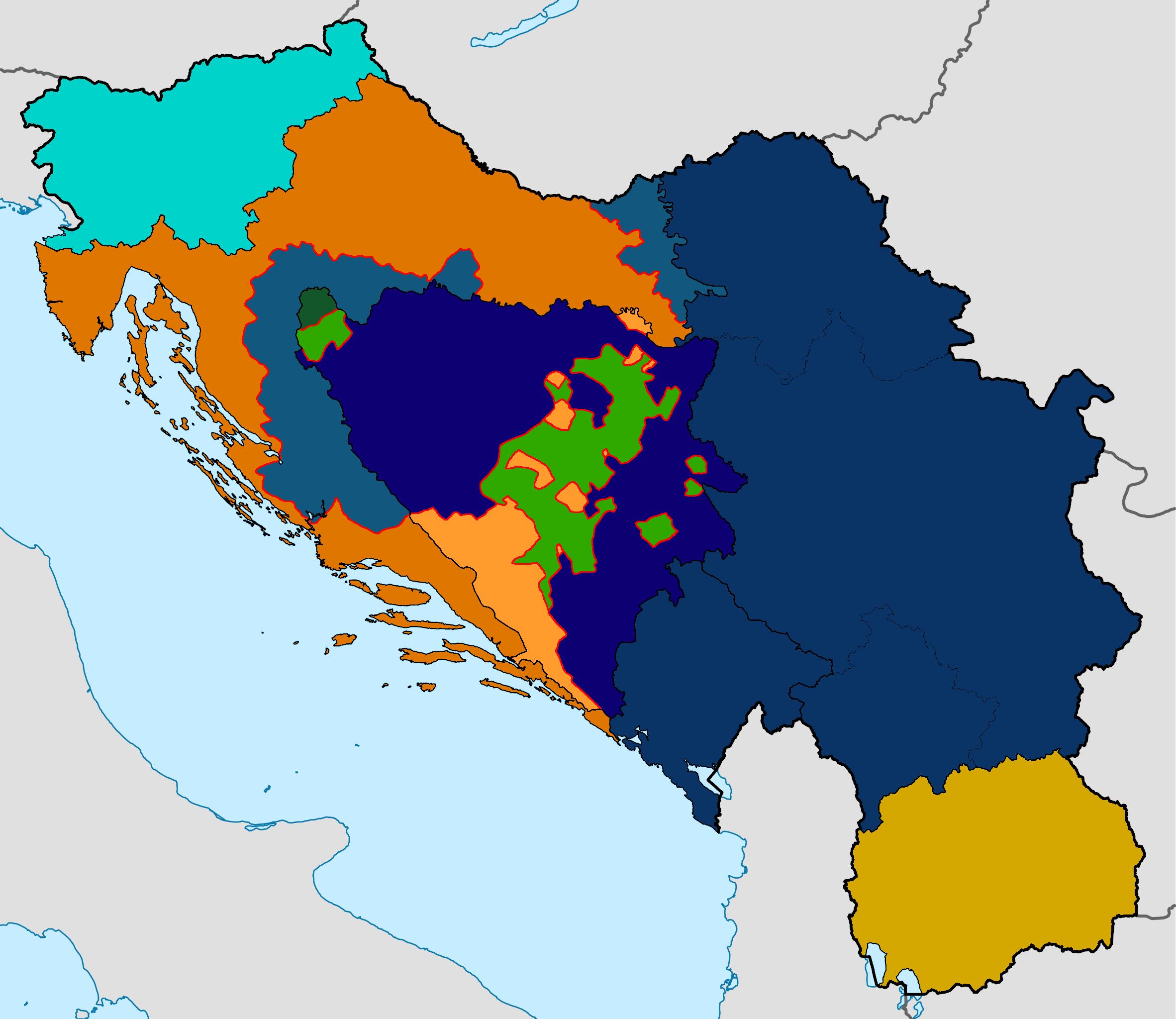
Map of the frontlines, late 1993.

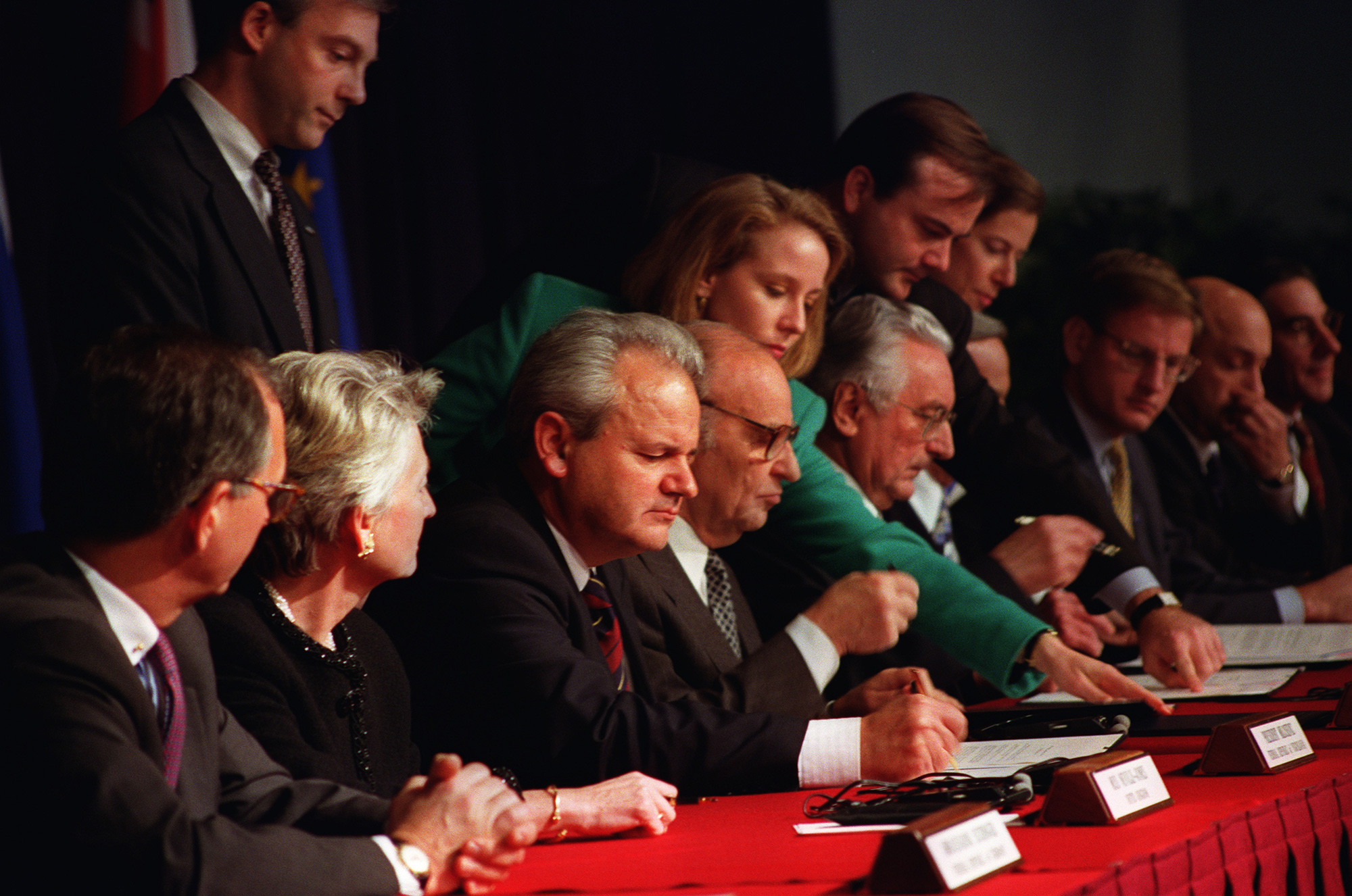
Slobodan Milošević, Alija Izetbegović and Franjo Tuđman signing the Dayton Agreement in Paris on 14 December 1995.

Milošević realized that Bosnia and Herzegovina was about to be recognized by the international community, and since Yugoslav Army troops were still located there at that time, their presence on Bosnian territory could have led to Serbia and Montenegro being accused of aggression. To avoid this, Milošević decided to move all JNA soldiers who originated from Serbia and Montenegro back into Serbia and Montenegro, and move all JNA soldiers who originated from Bosnia and Herzegovina back into Bosnia and Herzegovina. Thus, every Bosnian Serb was transferred from the Yugoslav army to what became the newly created Bosnian Serb Army. Through this, the Bosnian Serb army received extensive military equipment and full funding from the FRY, because the Bosnian Serb faction could not cover the costs on its own.

The Bosnian Serb Army was led by Ratko Mladić, an extremely controversial figure, who served in the Yugoslav Army during the Croatian War of Independence 1991–1992, and has been accused of committing war crimes in Bosnia.

On 24 March 2016, the ICTY issued its judgement in the separate case against former Bosnian Serb leader Radovan Karadžić, in which it concluded that insufficient evidence had been presented in that case to find that Slobodan Milosevic "agreed with the common plan" to create territories ethnically cleansed of non-Serbs during the Bosnian War of 1992 to 1995. The judgement noted "Milošević's repeated criticism and disapproval of the policies and decisions made by Karadžić and the Bosnian Serb leadership" and, in a footnote, the "apparent discord between Karadžić and Milošević" during which Milošević "openly criticised Bosnian Serb leaders of committing 'crimes against humanity' and 'ethnic cleansing' and the war for their own purposes." Nevertheless, the court also noted that "Milošević provided assistance in the form of personnel, provisions, and arms to the Bosnian Serbs during the conflict"

The Serbian Radical Party founder and paramilitary leader Vojislav Seselj publicly claimed that Milošević personally asked him to send paramilitaries from Serbia into Bosnia and Herzegovina. After 1993, media reports of large-scale atrocities by the Bosnian Serb armed forces, such as the long siege of Sarajevo, resulted in increased pressure and sanctions by western governments against Serbia and Montenegro to persuade Milošević to withdraw his support of the Bosnian Serbs. After 1993, Milošević abandoned his alliance with the Serbian Radical Party and declared that his government advocated a peaceful settlement to the war. The new coalition government abandoned its support of Radovan Karadžić's Bosnian Serb government and pressured the Bosnian Serbs to negotiate a peace treaty. During the Dayton Accord, Milošević sparred with Karadžić, who opposed the Dayton Accord, which Milošević supported as it gave Bosnian Serbs autonomy and self-governance over most of the territories they had claimed. In 1995, Milošević, President of Serbia, represented the Bosnian Serbs during the signing of the Dayton Peace Agreement.

=== Serbia in the Kosovo war ===
In 1998, facing political crisis, Milošević again formed a national-unity government with the Serbian Radical Party. After 1998, conflict in Kosovo intensified. The Yugoslav Army and the Serbian Police were in spring 1999. "in an organized manner, with significant use of state resources" conducted a broad campaign of violence against Albanian civilians in order to expel them from Kosovo and thus maintain political control of Belgrade over the province.

By June 1999, the Yugoslav military, Serbian police and paramilitaries expelled 862,979 Albanians from Kosovo, and several hundred thousand more were internally displaced, in addition to those displaced prior to March. Presiding Judge Iain Bonomy concluded that "deliberate actions of these forces during the campaign provoked the departure of at least 700,000 ethnic Albanians from Kosovo in the short period from late March to early June 1999".

Religious objects were also damaged or destroyed. Of the 498 mosques in Kosovo that were in active use, the International Criminal Tribunal for the former Yugoslavia (ICTY) documented that 225 mosques sustained damage or destruction by the Yugoslav Serb army. In all, eighteen months of the Yugoslav Serb counterinsurgency campaign between 1998 and 1999 within Kosovo resulted in 225 or a third out of a total of 600 mosques being damaged, vandalised, or destroyed. During the war, Islamic architectural heritage posed for Yugoslav Serb paramilitary and military forces as Albanian patrimony with destruction of non-Serbian architectural and cultural heritage being a methodical and planned component of ethnic cleansing in Kosovo.

== War crimes ==
Numerous war crimes were committed by Serbian military and Serbian paramilitary forces during the Yugoslav Wars. The crimes included massacres, ethnic cleansing, systematic rape, crimes against humanity. The International Court of Justice, cleared the Republic of Serbia of direct involvement in genocide, but found that it had failed to prevent mass killings, rapes, and ethnic cleansing.

The war crimes were usually carried out on ethnic and religious grounds and were primarily directed against civilians (Albanians, Croats and Bosniaks). Several United Nations bodies have judged that the aim of these war crimes in various wars was to create an ethnically pure Serbian state, or "Greater Serbia", encompassing Serbia as well as the Serb-populated areas in former Yugoslavia.

After the wars in the 1990s, many senior military and political leaders were convicted of war crimes; Radovan Karadžić was arrested in Belgrade in 2008, was tried and found guilty of war crimes in March 2016, and sentenced to 40 years in prison (the sentence was increased in 2019 to life imprisonment upon the rejection of his appeal). Others, including Ratko Mladić and Goran Hadžić, were not apprehended by Serbian authorities until 2011.

All parties involved in the conflict have committed "grave breaches" of the Geneva Conventions and other violations of international humanitarian law. These violations include the killing of civilians, rape, torture, and the deliberate destruction of civilian property, including cultural and religious property, such as churches and mosques. But, there are significant qualitative differences. Most of the violations were committed by Serbs against Bosnian Muslims.

— Final report of the United Nations Commission of Experts

Hadžić died while awaiting trial in July 2016. Mladić received life imprisonment. According to the definition of the International Criminal Tribunal for the former Yugoslavia, Serbian forces included the Yugoslav People's Army (JNA), Serb Territorial Defense of Bosnia and Herzegovina and Croatia, the Serbian Army of Krajina, the Army of Republika Srpska, territorial defense of Serbia and Montenegro, Police of Serbia and Police of Republika Srpska, including national security, special police forces of Krajina known as Martićevci (after Milan Martić), as well as all Serbian paramilitary forces and volunteer units.

=== Croatian War ===
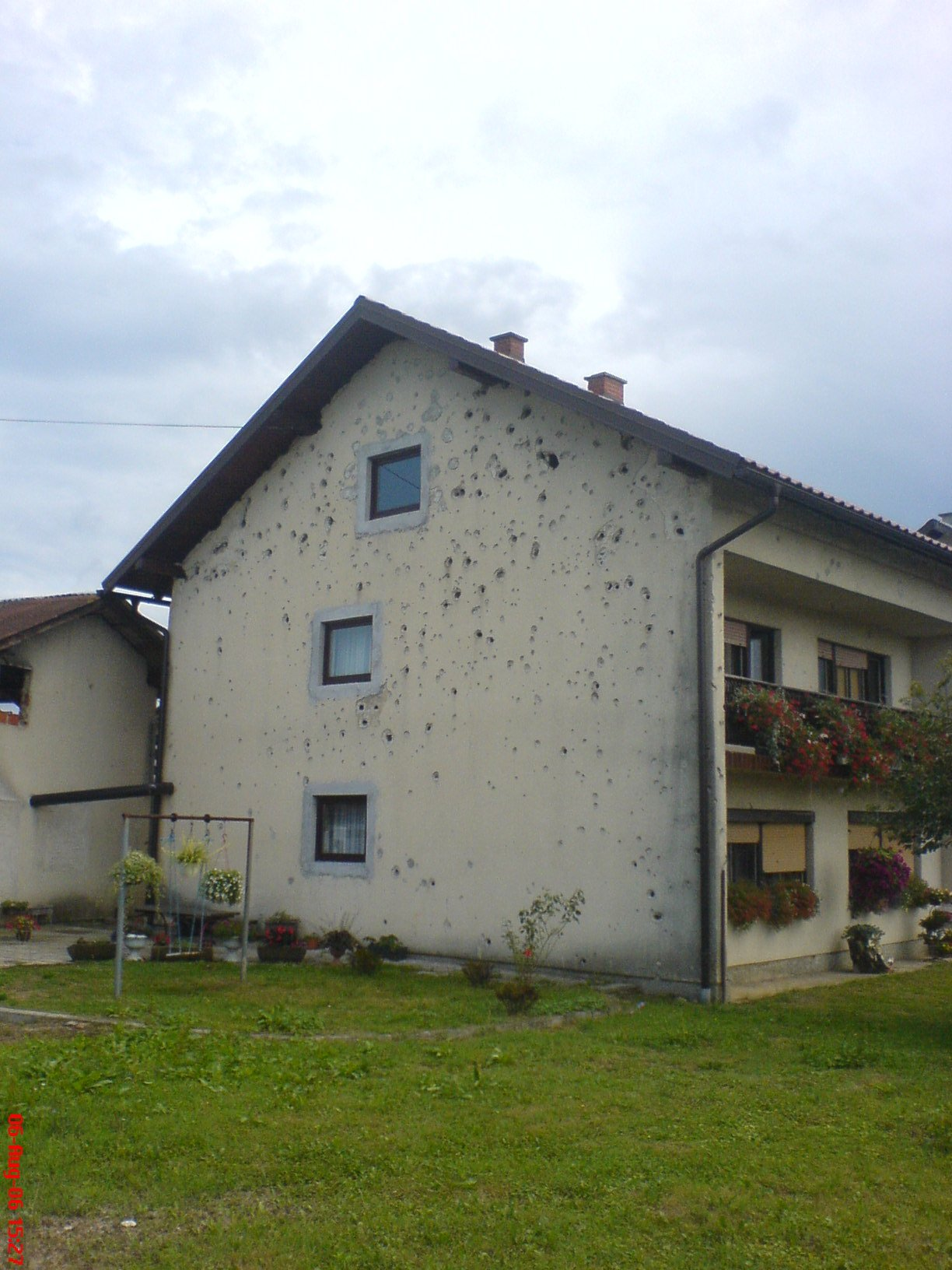
Shelling of Karlovac, a town situated directly at the front during the war

The Tribunal claimed that around 170,000 Croats were expelled from territories Serbian forces sought to control. Rebel Croatian Serbs' forces together with Serbian military and paramilitary forces committed numerous war crimes and massacres in the Republic of Croatia.

There were also prison camps, where several hundred Croatian prisoners of war and civilians were kept by Serbian authorities such as the Begejci camp, Sremska Mitrovica camp, Stajićevo camp and Velepromet camp which was located on the southern outskirts of the city of Vukovar, Croatia.

According to the Croatian Association of Prisoners in Serbian Concentration Camps, a total of 8,000 Croatian civilians and POWs (many following the fall of Vukovar) went through Serb prison camps such as Sremska Mitrovica camp, Stajićevo camp, Niš camp and many others where many were heavily abused and tortured. A total of 300 people never returned from them. A total of 4570 camp inmates have started legal action against the former Republic of Serbia and Montenegro (now Serbia) for torture and abuse in the camps.

In 1990s, during the war in Croatia in persecution of Croats in Serbia during Yugoslav Wars was organized and participated in the expulsion of the Croats in some places in Vojvodina.

According to Croatia's lawsuit against Yugoslavia (later the Republic of Serbia) in front of the International Court of Justice, 590 cities and villages were damaged and 35 entirely razed to the ground, three national parks, five natural parks and 19 park cultural monuments were damaged while 171,000 housing units (about 10 percent of the entire housing capacity of the country) were destroyed or damaged in Croatia during the war. About three million landmines were left by the warring factions that blocked about 300,000 hectares of arable land.

In its verdict against Ante Gotovina, the ICTY for the first time also concluded that the war in Croatia constituted an international armed conflict as the Serbian Army of Krajina acted as an extension to Serbia's military.

In particular, the Trial Chamber considered the evidence pertaining to Serbian President Milošević's control and influence over SVK forces and Serbia/FRY's funding, arming and supplying of the Krajina Serbs. Based on the above evidence, the Trial Chamber finds that Serbia/FRY had overall control of the SVK. Recalling the agreement of all the parties that Croatia and Serbia were engaged more broadly in hostilities around the beginning of the Indictment period, the Trial Chamber further finds that the armed conflict that existed at the outset of the Indictment period was international. If it was not already an international armed conflict in 1991, then it became one based on the SVK acting on behalf of Serbia/FRY.

— ICTY in its verdict against Ante Gotovina

=== Bosnian War ===
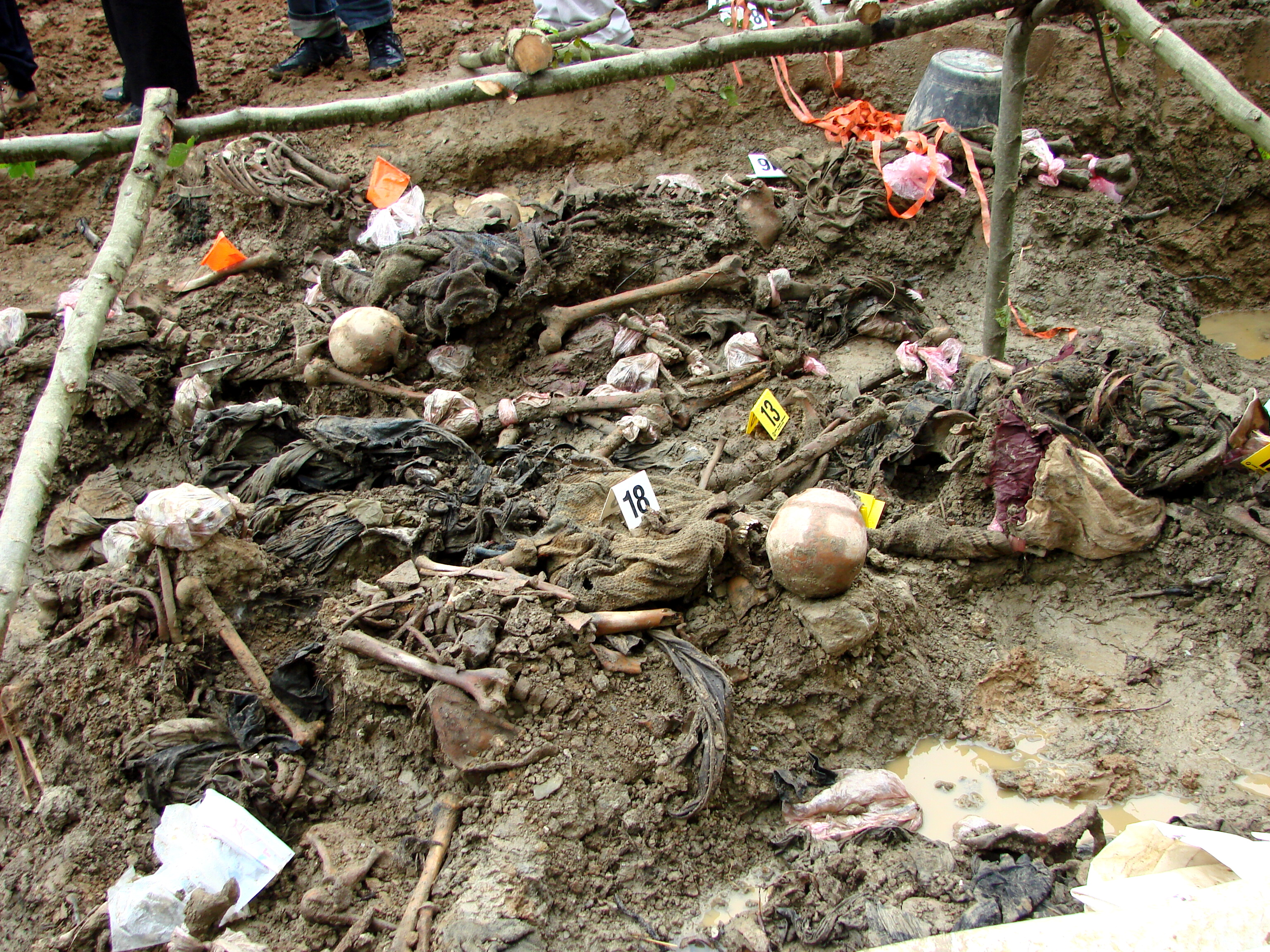
An exhumed mass grave in Potočari, Bosnia and Herzegovina, where key events in the Srebrenica Massacre unfolded.

Serbian paramilitary forces and Army of the Republika Srpska committed numerous war crimes against Bosnian civilian population during the Bosnian War.

There were several concentration and prison camps in Bosnia, run by Bosnian Serbs such as the Omarska camp, Keraterm camp, Manjača camp, Trnopolje camp, Uzamnica camp and Vilina Vlas.

The International Court of Justice confirmed the ICTY judgment that the Srebrenica massacre was genocide:

The Court concludes that the acts committed at Srebrenica falling within Article II (a) and (b) of the Convention were committed with the specific intent to destroy in part the group of the Muslims of Bosnia and Herzegovina as such; and accordingly that these were acts of genocide, committed by members of the VRS in and around Srebrenica from about 13 July 1995.

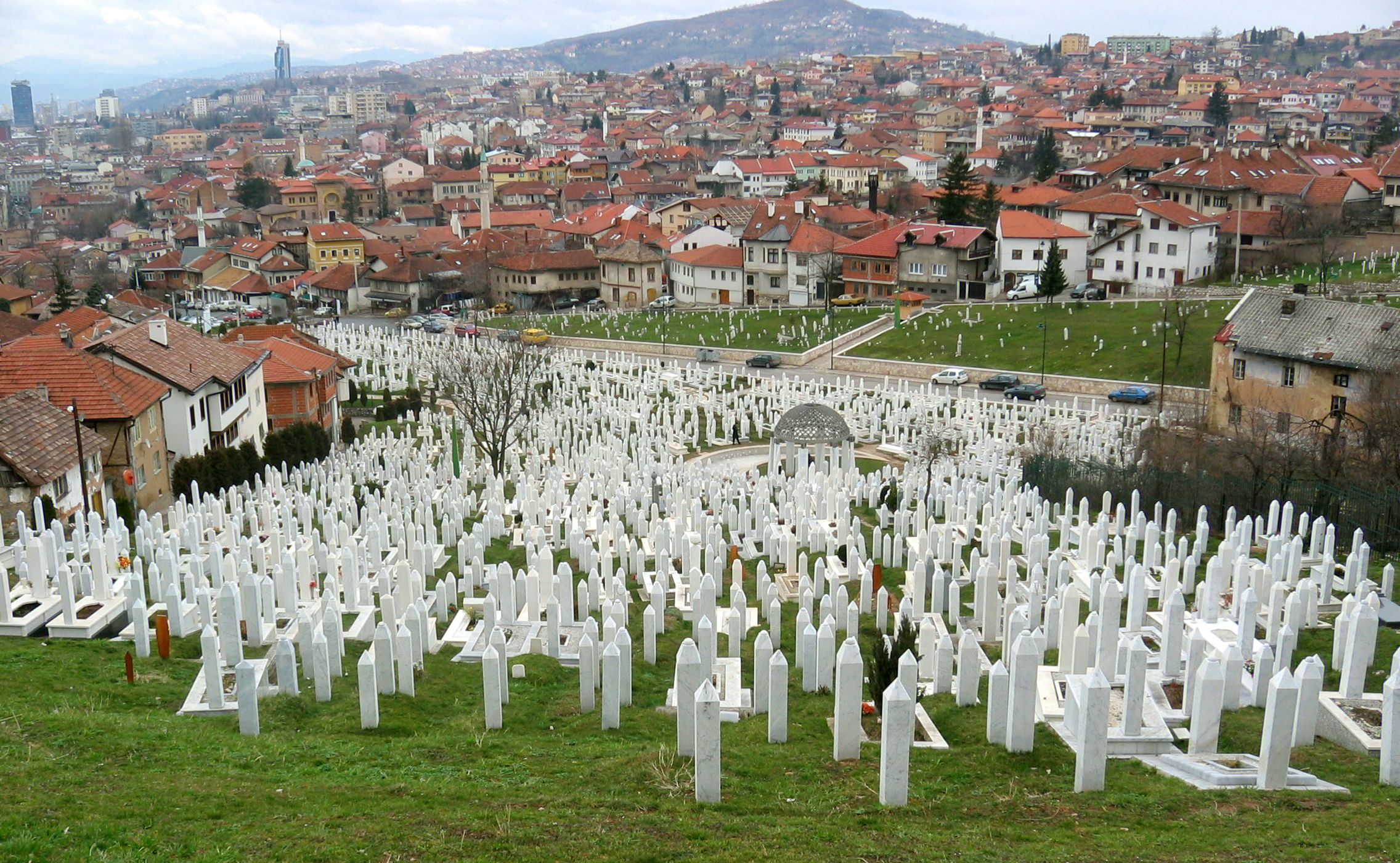
The Martyrs' Memorial Cemetery in Stari Grad for the victims of the siege of Sarajevo.

It cleared Republic of Serbia of direct involvement in genocide during the Bosnian war, but ruled that Belgrade did breach international law by failing to prevent the 1995 Srebrenica genocide.

=== Kosovo War ===
In the spring of 1999, the Serbian police and the Yugoslav Army were "in an organized manner, with significant use of state resources" conducting a broad campaign of violence against Albanian civilians in order to expel them from Kosovo and thus maintain political control of Belgrade over the province.

According to the legally binding verdict of the International Criminal Tribunal for the former Yugoslavia, Federal Army and Serbian police after the NATO bombing of Yugoslavia 24 March 1999, systematically attacked villages with Albanian population, abused, robbed and killed civilians, ordering them to go to Albania or Montenegro, burning their houses and by destroying their property. Within the campaign of violence, Albanians were mass expelled from their homes, murdered, sexually assaulted, and their religious buildings destroyed. Serbian forces committed numerous war crimes during the implementation of "joint criminal enterprise" whose aim was to "through the use of violence and terror, force a significant number of Kosovo Albanians to leave their homes, across the border, the state government to retain control over Kosovo". Ethnic cleansing of the Albanian population is performed by the following model: first the army surrounded a place, then followed the shelling, then the police entered the village, and often with them and the army, and then crimes occurs (murders, rapes, beatings, expulsions ... ).

Presiding Judge Iain Bonomy was imposing sentence said, "deliberate actions of these forces during the campaign provoked the departure of at least 700,000 ethnic Albanians from Kosovo in the short period from late March to early June 1999."

The following is an incomplete list of massacres attributed to Serb forces:

- Suva Reka massacre – 48 Albanian civilians victims, including 14 children, two infants, a pregnant woman and a 100-year-old woman.
- Račak massacre – 45 Albanians villagers.
- Meja massacre - At least 377 Albanian civilians were massacred by Serbian police and paramilitary forces.
- Podujevo massacre – Serb forces kill 19 Albanian civilians.
- Krusha massacres – Serbian special police units systematically massacred 243 civilians.
- Izbica massacre – approximately 120 Albanian civilians massacred.
- Drenica massacre – 29 bodies found.
- Gornje Obrinje massacre – 18 bodies found in Kosovo, in addition to an unspecified number of other fatalities.
- Cuska massacre – 41 known victims.
- Bela Crkva massacre – 62 known victims.
- Orahovac massacre – between 50 and 200+ ethnic Albanian civilians.
- Dubrava Prison massacre – Serbian prison guards killed more than 70 Albanian prisoners.
- Ćuška massacre near Peć on 14 May 1999 attributed to the Jackals and other Yugoslav paramilitary during the Kosovo War.
- Vučitrn massacre near Vucitrn on 2 May 1999. Between 97 and 105 Albanians were killed.

Goran Stoparić, an ex-member of the Special Anti-terrorist Unit (SAJ), speculating about motives behind the Podujevo massacre, stated:

In my opinion, the only motive was the fact that the victims were Albanians, and perhaps because of some hidden immaturity or sickness of mind on their part. They would probably have killed them had they been Bosnians or Croats. But it is certain that they were killed because they were not Serbs.

== War crime trials ==
=== International trials ===
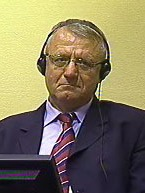
Vojislav Šešelj

Until 7 October 1991, the International Court of Justice treated all violent conflicts in ex-Yugoslavia as internal clashes or civil war. But after that date, all conflicts, especially armed confrontations and human victims, were considered to be international armed conflicts. The Republic of Serbia officially denied any military engagement into Bosnian War and Croatian War for Independence. However, many Serbian political, military and paramilitary leaders (including Slobodan Milošević, Vojislav Šešelj, Jovica Stanišić, Franko Simatović, Veljko Kadijević, Blagoje Adžić and Željko Ražnatović) were accused of war crimes committed in Bosnia and Croatia. According to Prosecution, those leaders participated in a joint criminal enterprise aimed to established "Greater Serbia" from the disintegrating Yugoslavia.

The prosecution's argument that [...] the allegations made in the three indictments [Croatia, Bosnia, and Kosovo] were all part of a common scheme, strategy or plan on the part of the accused [Slobodan Milošević] to create a "Greater Serbia", a centralised Serbian state encompassing the Serb-populated areas of Croatia and Bosnia and all of Kosovo, and that this plan was to be achieved by forcibly removing non-Serbs from large geographical areas through the commission of the crime charged in the indictments. Although the events in Kosovo were separated from those in Croatia and Bosnia by more than three years, they were, the prosecution claimed, no more than a continuation of that plan, and they could only be understood completely by reference to what had happened in Croatia and Bosnia.

— Decision of the ICTY Appeals Chamber; 18 April 2002.

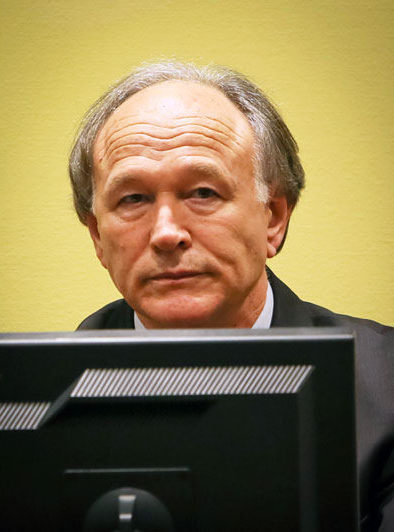
Vlastimir Đorđević

Also complicit were "Serbian forces", including the Yugoslav People's Army (JNA), later the Yugoslav Army (VJ), the newly formed Serbian Territorial Defense of Bosnia and Herzegovina and Croatia, Republic of Serbian Krajina Army, the Army of the Republika Srpska, territorial defense of Serbia and Montenegro, the police of Serbia and the police of Republika Srpska, including national security, special police forces of the Krajina region known as "Martićevci, as well as all Serbian paramilitary forces and volunteer units.

Slobodan Milošević, along with Milan Milutinović, Nikola Šainović, Dragoljub Ojdanić and Vlajko Stojiljković were charged by the International Criminal Tribunal for the former Yugoslavia (ICTY) with crimes against humanity including murder, forcible transfer, deportation and "persecution on political, racial or religious grounds" during the Kosovo War. Milošević became the first sitting head of state to be charged with war crimes. Further indictments were leveled in October 2003 against former armed forces chief of staff Nebojša Pavković, former army corps commander Vladimir Lazarević, former police official Vlastimir Đorđević and the current head of Serbia's public security, Sreten Lukić. All were indicted for crimes against humanity and violations of the laws or customs of war. Tribunal prosecutor's office has accused Milosevic of "the gravest violations of human rights in Europe since the Second World War". Milošević died in detention before he could be sentenced.

The Court pronounced the following verdict for war crimes in Kosovo:

- Milan Milutinović, former President of the Republic of Serbia and Yugoslav Foreign Minister, acquitted.
- Nikola Šainović, Yugoslav Deputy Prime Minister, guilty on all counts, sentenced to 22 years in prison.
- Dragoljub Ojdanić, Chief of General Staff of the VJ, guilty of two counts, sentenced to 15 years in prison.
- Nebojša Pavković, commander of Third Army, guilty on all counts, sentenced to 22 years in prison.
- Vladimir Lazarević, commander of the Pristina Corps VJ, guilty of two counts, sentenced to 15 years in prison.
- Sreten Lukić, Chief of Staff of the Serbian police, guilty on all counts, sentenced to 22 years in prison.

Šainović, Pavković and Lukić were convicted as members of the joint criminal enterprise, while others are convicted of aiding and abetting crimes.

=== Domestic trials ===
The democratic leadership of Serbia recognized the need to investigate Serbian war crimes after the fall of Milošević, and a special war crimes tribunal was founded in Belgrade in 2003, after the Parliament of Serbia passed the Law on Organization and Competence of State Bodies in the Proceedings Against War Crimes Perpetrators.

Since then, the special prosecutor has prosecuted and the court has convicted several individuals for instances of war crimes, also committed under the command of the Serbian Ministry of Internal Affairs and other state agencies.

== Post-war developments ==
=== Bosnian War ===
Despite the ICTY finding, confirmed by the ICJ, a range of alternative views of the Srebrenica massacre exist, most of which argue that fewer than 8,000 were killed. The denial of the figure points out that fewer names were listed, that some were not even killed in that area and had died in previous years, in some cases people turned out to be alive, etc. Sonja Biserko of the Helsinki Committee for Human Rights in Serbia notes:

Denial of the Srebrenica genocide takes many forms. The methods range from the brutal to the deceitful. Denial is present most strongly in political discourse, in the media, in the sphere of law, and in the educational system.

According to Human Rights Watch, the ultra-nationalist Serbian Radical Party "launched an aggressive campaign to prove that Muslims had committed crimes against thousands of Serbs in the area", which "was intended to diminish the significance of the July 1995 crime". The ICTY Office of the Prosecutor noted that the number of Serb deaths in the region alleged by the Serbian authorities had increased from 1400 to 3500, a figure the Prosecutor stated "[does] not reflect the reality". Personal details were only available for 624 victims. The validity of labeling some of the casualties as "victims" is also contested – studies have found a significant majority of military casualties as compared to civilian casualties.

=== Kosovo War ===
The Serbian police denied perpetrating the Drenica massacres in February–March 1998 and claimed they were just pursuing "terrorists" who had attacked the police. A police spokesman denied the "lies and inventions" about indiscriminate attacks and excessive force and said "the police has never resorted to such methods and never will." Belgrade government also denied responsibility for Vučitrn and Gornje Obrinje massacre on 26 September 1998. President Slobodan Milosevic has denied a policy of ethnic cleansing during the NATO bombing in Kosovo 1999, but the Court latter found that Serbian state conducted systematic campaign of terror and violence against Kosovo Albanians in order to expel them from Kosovo.

=== Domestic situation ===
Many Croats of Serbia suffered persecution during the Yugoslav Wars, escalating with the 1992 expulsions in Hrtkovci for which Vojislav Šešelj was charged by the ICTY.

The high number of casualties incurred in the Battle of Vukovar caused serious popular discontent in Serbia and Montenegro, where tens of thousands of those receiving draft papers went into hiding or left the country. A near-mutiny broke out in some reservist units, and mass demonstrations against the war were held in the Serbian towns of Valjevo, Čačak and Kragujevac. In one famous incident, a tank driver named Vladimir Živković drove his tank all the way from the front line at Vukovar to the federal parliament in Belgrade. Many Serbs did not identify with the Croatian Serb cause and were unwilling to see their lives, or those of their children, sacrificed at Vukovar.

Following the end of Yugoslav Wars, Serbian war crimes court sparked controversy on at least four occasions after issuing indictments and arrest warrants against non-Serbs that were later found to be lacking substance. These indictments against foreign citizens of Serbia are perceived by some as key to redressing the "aggressor-victim" balance in the wars.

- Hasan Morina – a Kosovo Albanian, accused by the prosecutor's office of war crimes against Serbs, was acquitted of all charges by a court and released from detention.
- Ejup Ganić – Bosniak member of the Presidency of Bosnia and Herzegovina during the Bosnian War. On 1 March 2010, Ganić was arrested on Heathrow Airport in London after Serbian judicial authorities issued an extradition warrant against him for alleged war crimes against Serbs. Judge Timothy Workman, however, decided that Ganić should be immediately released because Serbia's request lacked "any serious evidence". In his decision, he also said that Serbia's request "[was] being used for political purposes, and as such amounts to an abuse of the process of this court".
- Tihomir Purda – a former Croat soldier who defended Vukovar during the battle of Vukovar the 87-day siege of the city in 1991. In February 2011, he was detained on the Bosnian border because Serbia issued an extradition warrant against him for alleged war crimes against Serb soldiers in Vukovar. Serbia's indictment was based on the time when Purda was in the Begejci and Sremska Mitrovica camps, and forced to sign a statement admitting the crimes. Purda denied any wrongdoing and told the judges in Bosnia that his confession in Serbia was obtained under torture. After Deputy war crimes prosecutor Bruno Vekarić subsequently interviewed 44 witnesses both in Serbia and Croatia, the investigation did not find a single witness who burdened Purda. The indictment against him was dropped in March.
- Jovan Divjak – a Bosnian general of ethnic Serb descent; on 3 March 2011, he was detained in Vienna because Serbia issued an extradition warrant against him for alleged war crimes against Serbs in the 1992 Yugoslav People's Army column incident in Sarajevo. After an almost four month review of evidence, the Austrian authorities rejected Serbia's extradition request due to lack of proof. He too was released and returned to Sarajevo on 29 July 2011.

In Serbia, many people deny war crimes imputed to Serbia or the Serb people. Some public figures who are known for speaking openly about crimes committed by Serbs are labeled as a "traitors".

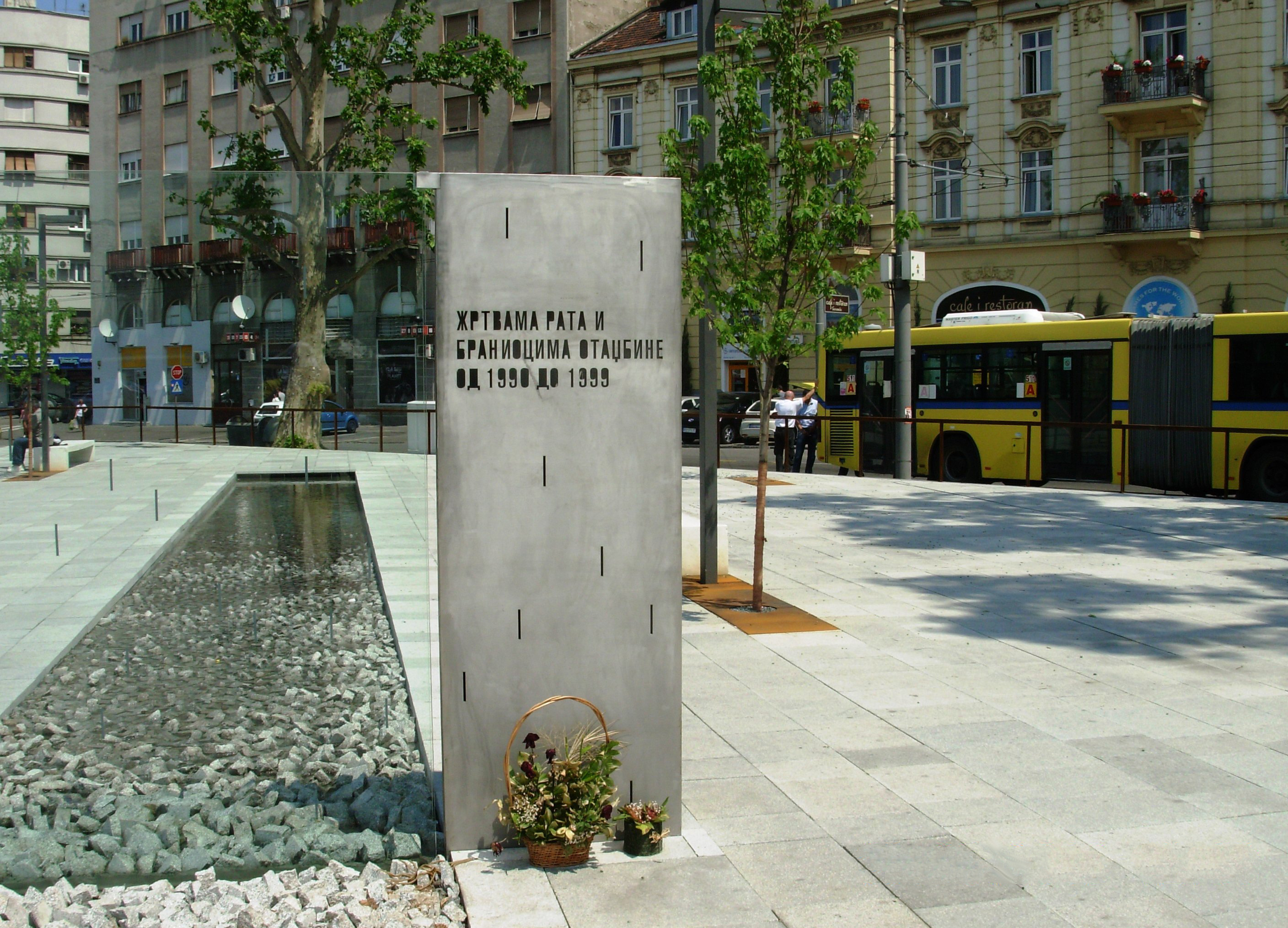
Monument to the victims of the Yugoslav Wars in Belgrade

=== PTSD in diaspora ===
A study conducted in the Greater Toronto Area, involving the University of Toronto, regarding Posttraumatic stress disorder, found symptoms of PTSD in 26.3% of Serbian children due to war-related stress or during the Kosovo conflict.

== Displaced Serbs after the wars ==
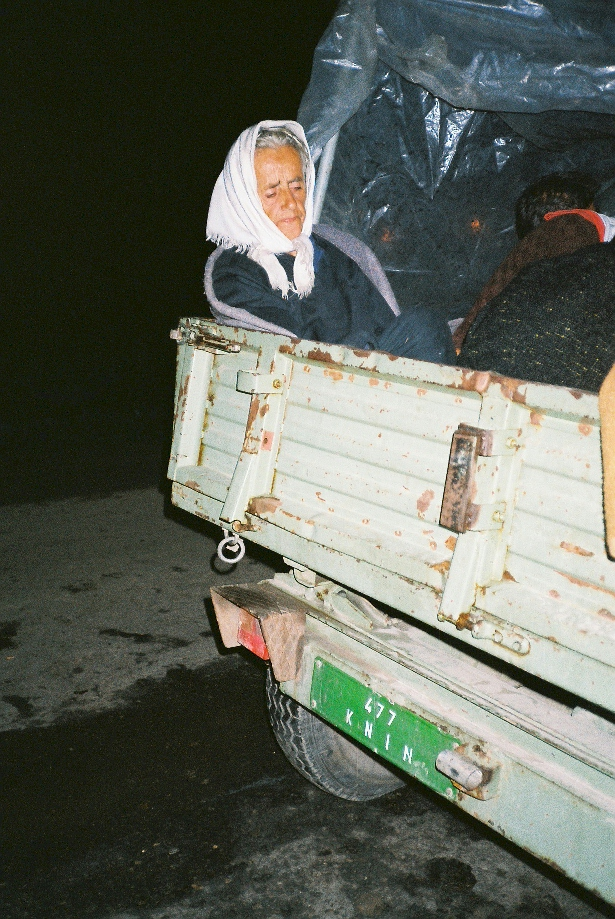
An elderly Croatian Serb refugee after the Operation Storm

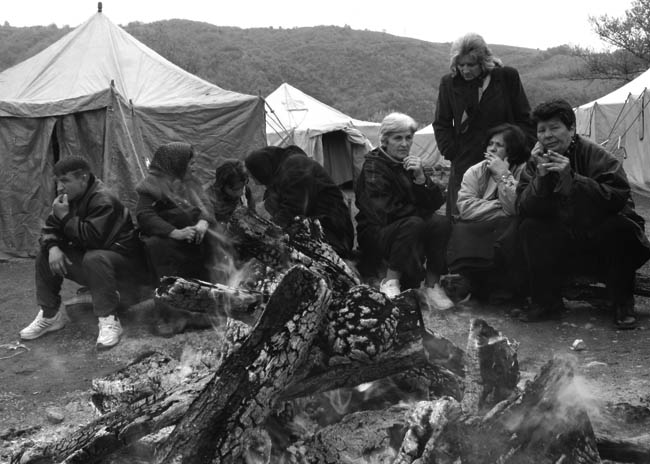
Kosovo Serbs refugees

At the conclusion of the wars in Bosnia and Croatia, numerous Serbs relocated to Serbia and Montenegro. By 1996, Serbia and Montenegro hosted about 300,000 registered refugees from Croatia and 250,000 from Bosnia and Herzegovina, while an additional 15,000 persons from Macedonia and Slovenia were also registered as refugees. The UNHCR registered 566,000 refugees from Croatia and Bosnia in Serbia and Montenegro. During the first half of 1996, more than 40,000 Bosnian Serbs arrived in the FRY. About three quarters had left suburbs of Sarajevo that were to fall under the control of the Bosnian Federation. Following the Kosovo war, 200,000 to 245,000 Serb, Roma, Ashkali, Albanian and Egyptian people fled into Serbia proper or within Kosovo, fearing revenge, and due to severe violence and terrorist attacks against mostly Serbian civilians after the war amounting to about 700,000 displaced or refugees in that country. One out of every eleven people was either a refugees or displacee in Serbia by 1999. This made that country became home to highest number of refugees and internally displaced persons in Europe.

== Anti-war movement ==
Following the rise of nationalism and political tensions after Slobodan Milošević came to power, as well as the outbreaks of the Yugoslav Wars, numerous anti-war movements developed in Serbia. The anti-war protests in Belgrade were held mostly because of opposition the Siege of Vukovar, Siege of Dubrovnik and Siege of Sarajevo, while protesters demanded the referendum on a declaration of war and disruption of military conscription.

More than 50,000 people participated in many protests, and more than 150,000 people took part in the most massive protest called "The Black Ribbon March" in solidarity with people in Sarajevo. It is estimated that between 50,000 and 200,000 people deserted from the Yugoslav People's Army, while between 100,000 and 150,000 people emigrated from Serbia refusing to participate in the war.

According to professor Renaud De la Brosse, senior lecturer at the University of Reims and a witness called by the International Criminal Tribunal for the former Yugoslavia (ICTY), it is surprising how great the resistance to Milošević's propaganda was among Serbs, given that and the lack of access to alternative news. Political scientists Orli Fridman described that not enough attention was given to anti-war activism among scholars studying the breakup of Yugoslavia and the wars, as well as that independent media and anti-war groups from Serbia did not attract the international attention.

== Downfall of Slobodan Milošević ==
After the defeat of Milošević's party at the 1996 Serbian local elections and attempting electoral fraud, several months of anti-government protests took place and the opposition boycotted the following 1997 Serbian general election. The wide opposition alliance won the 2000 Yugoslavian general election, which led to the overthrow of Slobodan Milošević. That resulted in the withdrawn of international sanctions and admission of the FR Yugoslavia into the United Nations. In June 2001, the reformist government of Zoran Đinđić arrested Milošević and extradited him over to the ICTY, where the war crimes trial began

== Military groups reported of committing war crimes ==
- Serb Volunteer Guard, also known as Arkan's Tigers, for ethnic cleansing in Bosnia and Croatia.
- Serbian Guard
- White Eagles (paramilitary), also known as Šešeljevci, for ethnic cleansing in Bosnia, Croatia, Vojvodina and Kosovo.
- Scorpions (paramilitary)
- Yellow Wasps
- Dušan the Mighty
- Wolves of Vučjak
- Special Anti-terrorist Unit (SAJ), carried out Attack on Prekaz.

== Sources ==
Books

- Baker, Catherine (2015). The Yugoslav Wars of the 1990s. Macmillan International Higher Education. ISBN 978-1-137-39899-4.
- Caspersen, Nina (2010). Contested Nationalism: Serb Elite Rivalry in Croatia and Bosnia in the 1990s. Berghahn Books. ISBN 978-1-84545-791-4.
- Denitch, Bogdan Denis (1996). Ethnic nationalism: The tragic death of Yugoslavia. Minneapolis: University of Minnesota Press. ISBN 978-0-8166-2947-3.
- Gagnon, V. P. Jr (2006). The Myth of Ethnic War: Serbia and Croatia in the 1990s. Cornell University Press. ISBN 0-8014-7291-1.
- LeBor, Adam (2004). Milosevic: A Biography. New Haven, Connecticut: Yale University Press. ISBN 978-0-300-10317-5.
- Ramet, Sabrina P. (2006). The Three Yugoslavias: State-Building and Legitimation, 1918–2005. New York: Indiana University Press. ISBN 0-253-34656-8.
- Trbovich, Ana S. (2008). A Legal Geography of Yugoslavia's Disintegration. Oxford University Press. ISBN 978-0-19-533343-5.
- Ullman, Richard Henry (1996). The World and Yugoslavia's Wars. Council on Foreign Relations. ISBN 978-0-87609-191-3.

Journals

- Kataria, Shyamal (2015). "Serbian Ustashe Memory and Its Role in the Yugoslav Wars, 1991–1995". Mediterranean Quarterly. 26 (2): 115–127. doi:10.1215/10474552-2914550. S2CID 154634001.
- Mirković, D. (2000). "The historical link between the Ustasha genocide and the Croato-Serb civil war: 1991-1995". Journal of Genocide Research. 2 (3): 363–373. doi:10.1080/713677614. S2CID 72467680.
- Obradović, S. (2016). "Don't forget to remember: Collective memory of the Yugoslav wars in present-day Serbia". Peace and Conflict: Journal of Peace Psychology. 22 (1): 12–18. doi:10.1037/pac0000144.
- Perunovic, Sreca (2015). "Animosities in Yugoslavia before its demise: Revelations of an opinion poll survey". Ethnicities. 16 (6): 819–841. doi:10.1177/1468796815576059. S2CID 147068505.
