= Torak =

Torak may refer to:

- Torak (Žitište), a village in Serbia
- Lake Torak, a spring on the river Čikola, Croatia
- Kal Torak, a deity in The Belgariad, a fantasy epic written by David Eddings
- Torak, the protagonist of the Chronicles of Ancient Darkness series by Michelle Paver
- He-Man’s original name (see Origin of the franchise)
