= Aleksandar Marton (politician) =

Serbian politician

Aleksandar Marton (Serbian Cyrillic: Александар Мартон; born 24 February 1976) is a politician in Serbia. He has served in the National Assembly of Serbia, the Assembly of Vojvodina, and the Zrenjanin city assembly as a member of the League of Social Democrats of Vojvodina (LSV).

== Early life and career ==
Marton was born and raised in Zrenjanin, in what was then the Socialist Autonomous Province of Vojvodina , Socialist Republic of Serbia in the Socialist Federal Republic of Yugoslavia. He studied international relations at the University of Belgrade Faculty of Political Sciences before returning to his hometown.

== Political career ==
=== Early activism ===
Marton was a member of the opposition group Otpor! and took part in protests against Slobodan Milošević's government. In May 2000, it was reported that he and three other Otpor! members had been arrested and detained for several hours for handing out leaflets in Zrenjanin. He was first elected to the Zrenjanin assembly in the 2000 Serbian municipal elections, held after the fall of Milošević, and has been re-elected in every municipal election since then.

Marton appeared on the LSV's Together for Tolerance electoral list in the 2003 Serbian parliamentary election. The list did not cross the electoral threshold to win representation in the assembly. He served as vice-president (i.e., deputy speaker) of the Zrenjanin city assembly from 2004 to 2006.

=== Member of the National Assembly ===
The LSV contested the 2007 parliamentary election in an alliance with the Liberal Democratic Party. Marton received the 119th position on their list and was selected for a mandate after the list won fifteen seats. (From 2000 to 2011, Serbian parliamentary mandates were awarded to sponsoring parties or coalitions rather than to individual candidates, and it was common practice for the mandates to be awarded out of numerical order. Marton's position on the list had no bearing on whether or not he received a mandate.)

Following the election, an unstable coalition government was formed under the leadership of the Democratic Party (DS), the Democratic Party of Serbia (DSS), and G17 Plus (G17+). The LSV served in opposition. In October 2007, Marton criticized the government's new legislation for Vojvodina, saying that it did not go far enough in granting autonomy to the province. He was particularly critical of a clause that would have required provincial bodies to submit any decisions to the corresponding ministry within twenty-four hours; he was quoted as saying, "Any deadlines in this regard are unacceptable to us, because they are an indication that the central authorities are treating Vojvodina like poor students who have to have their homework checked by their parents. That is a bad message for Vojvodina." He later opposed a proposal to divide Vojvodina into five regions, describing it as a "plan for the division and fragmentation of Vojvodina and a denial of its autonomy."

=== Municipal politician ===
The DS–DSS coalition fell apart in early 2008, and a new election was called for later in the year. The LSV contested this election in an alliance with the DS on an electoral list called For a European Serbia; Marton received the 117th position on the list. During the campaign, he sarcastically accused the LDP of stealing his party's policies on provincial autonomy. The list won 102 mandates, but Marton was not selected for a new term in the assembly. He was also included on the LSV's Together for Vojvodina list in the concurrent 2008 Vojvodina provincial election but here too was not selected for a mandate. He was, however, elected as an LSV delegate to the Zrenjanin city assembly and was subsequently chosen as the assembly's president (i.e., speaker), a position he held for the next four years.

In 2009, Marton met with Croats who had been held in Serb-run detention camps in Vojvodina during the Yugoslav Wars of the 1990s and announced his support for their campaign to erect memorials to those who had been killed in the Begejci camp and Stajićevo camp (at least twenty Croats are known to have died at these camps in 1991–92). This was met with strong opposition from the Serbian War Veterans Party and others, and Marton has said that he was subject to death threats at this time. He subsequently condemned militants from the far-right group NASI (Ours) for burning the flag of Vojvodina at a demonstration in Zrenjanin in March 2012. He was quoted as saying, "The Vojvodina Assembly has legitimately passed the decision on Vojvodina's right to use the provincial coat of arms and flag. So this act of vandalism is anti-constitutional and criminal, and all those who are responsible must be appropriately sanctioned and punished. As the president of the Zrenjanin City Assembly, but also as a man, I believe that anyone who is capable of burning the flag of the Autonomous Province of Vojvodina is capable of continuing to destroy the constitutional order with acts of hatred and violence."

=== Member of the Assembly of Vojvodina and after ===
Serbia reformed its electoral system in 2011, such that mandates were awarded in numerical order to candidates on successful lists. Marton received the 185th position on the Democratic Party–led Choice for a Better Life list in the 2012 election; the list won sixty-seven mandates, and he was not returned. He was, however elected to the Assembly of the Vojvodina in the concurrent 2012 provincial election, winning in Zrenjanin's second constituency seat. The LSV participated in Vojvodina's coalition government after the election, and Marton served as a supporter of the ministry.

Vojvodina subsequently abolished its constituency seats and introduced a system of pure proportional representation for the 2016 provincial election. Marton received the fourteenth position on the LSV's list and missed re-election when the list won nine mandates. He is currently the next candidate in sequenced with the right to accept a mandate if another LSV representative leaves the assembly prior to the next election. He also appeared on a combined list of the LSV, the LDP, and the Social Democratic Party (SDS) in the 2016 Serbian parliamentary election in the 223rd position, much too low for election to be a realistic prospect.

He continues to serve in the city assembly as of 2019.

== Electoral record ==
=== Provincial (Vojvodina) ===
2012 Vojvodina assembly election Zrenjanin II (constituency seat) - First and Second Rounds
| Aleksandar Marton | League of Social Democrats of Vojvodina | 3,638 | 22.81 | 8,899 | 62.64 |
| Zlatana Ankić | Let's Get Vojvodina Moving | 3,468 | 21.75 | 5,307 | 37.36 |
| Predrag Jeremić | Choice for a Better Vojvodina | 2,215 | 13.89 | | |
| Mihalj Balić | Alliance of Vojvodina Hungarians | 1,669 | 10.46 | | |
| Lidia Čonka Bosiljković | Socialist Party of Serbia–Party of United Pensioners of Serbia–United Serbia–Social Democratic Party of Serbia | 1,031 | 6.46 | | |
| Sonja Vujić | Coalition for the Municipality of Zrenjanin–United Regions of Serbia–Dušan Juvanin | 998 | 6.26 | | |
| Milan Kočalović | Democratic Party of Serbia | 930 | 5.83 | | |
| Rastko Stefanović | Preokret | 710 | 4.45 | | |
| Vladimir Zlatanović | Citizen's Group: Movement for Equality–I Love Zrenjanin | 701 | 4.40 | | |
| Milorad Krstin | Serbian Radical Party | 588 | 3.69 | | |
| Total valid votes | | 15,948 | 100 | 14,206 | 100 |
