= Aleksandar Marton =

Aleksandar Marton may refer to:

- Sandy Marton (born 1959), Croatian singer with an Italian career
- Aleksandar Marton (politician) (born 1976), politician in Serbia
