= Croatian Association of Prisoners in Serbian Concentration Camps =

Association logo

Croatian Association of Prisoners in Serbian Concentration Camps (Croatian: Hrvatsko društvo logoraša srpskih koncentracijskih logora) is an association of former prisoners in Serbian jails and prison camps during the Croatian War of Independence. The organization was founded in Zagreb in 1995 and began its work that same year. Its offices are located on Ban Jelačić Square. In 2006, the association was admitted to the World Veterans Federation. Its president as of 2015 is Danijel Rehak.

The organization helps raise monuments, commemorates anniversaries relating to the war and also helps publish related books. In 2004 the association opened a centre in Borovo Naselje, whose aim is to research war crimes committed during the war. The centre was opened by deputy prime minister Jadranka Kosor and parliamentary speaker Vladimir Šeks. Kosor served as the minister of Family Affairs, War Veterans and Intergenerational Solidarity, a ministry with which the association works closely.

According to the Societies data, a total of 8,000 Croatian civilians and POWs (a large number after the fall of Vukovar) went through Serb prison camps at Sremska Mitrovica, Stajićevo and elsewhere; some 300 people never returned from them.

A total of 4570 camp inmates started legal action in 2004 against the former Federal Republic of Yugoslavia of Serbia and Montenegro (now the Republic of Serbia) for torture and abuse in the camps.
