= Jackals (paramilitary) =

- Šakali
- Active: 1990's – 1999
- Allegiance: Federal Republic of Yugoslavia
- Branch: Yugoslav Army
- Type: Infantry; Paramilitary
- Size: ~100
- Mascot: Jackal
- Engagements: Kosovo War; Ćuška massacre

Commanders
- Notable commanders: Nebojša Minić

The Jackals (Serbian: Шакали / Šakali) were a Serbian paramilitary group that operated during the Kosovo War in 1999.

== Ćuška massacre ==
On 14 May 1999, 41 Kosovo Albanian male civilians, aged 19 to 69, were killed by the group and other Serbian forces. Serb forces entered the village, during which they began looting houses and expelling women and children to neighboring villages. The men into three groups and were taken into three separate houses, where they were gunned down with automatic weapons. The houses were then set on fire.

Nine members of the group were arrested on 13 March 2010 on suspicion of having committed war crimes in Ćuška. A trial in Belgrade started on 20 December 2010. The trial included:

- Srećko Popović
- Slaviša Kastratović
- Boban Bogićević
- Radoslav Brnović
- Vidoje Korićanin
- Veljko Korićanin
- Abdulah Sokić

They are accused of committing murders, rapes and robberies in an "extremely brutal" way, with "the main goal to spread fear among Albanian civilians in order to force them to leave their homes and flee to Albania." Hasan Çeku, father of former Kosovo prime minister and wartime commander of the Kosovo Liberation Army, Agim Çeku, as well as several members of his family were among the murdered people.

The leader, Nebojša Minić, nicknamed Commander of Death, was arrested in Argentina in 2005 under a warrant of the Hague Tribunal, but died shortly of AIDS after the arrest. Zoran Obradović was arrested in Germany on 25 December 2010. Milojko Nikolić, nickname Šumadija, was arrested on 28 December 2010 in Montenegro.

== See also ==
- Serbia in the Yugoslav Wars
- Agim Çeku
