= Stajićevo =

Stajićevo Стајићево
- Village (Selo)
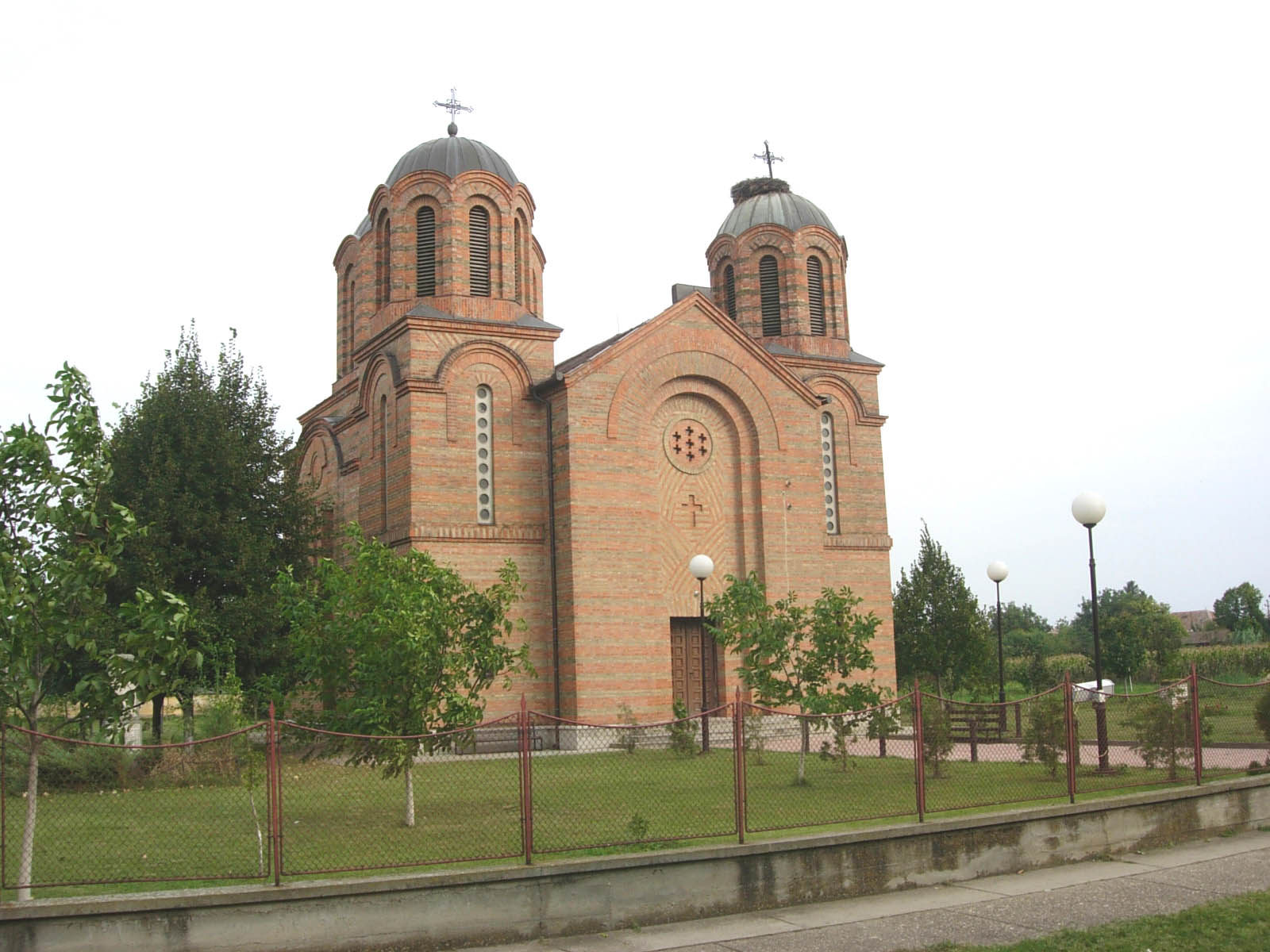
- The Orthodox Church

- Location within Serbia Stajićevo (Serbia) Stajićevo (Europe)
- Coordinates: 45°17′23″N 20°27′14″E
- Country: Serbia
- Province: Vojvodina
- District: Central Banat
- Municipalities: Zrenjanin
- Elevation: 76 m (249 ft)

Population (2002)
  - Stajićevo: 1,999
- Time zone: UTC+1 (CET)
  - Summer (DST): UTC+2 (CEST)
- Postal code: 23204
- Area code: +381(0)23
- Car plates: ZR

Stajićevo (Serbian Cyrillic: Стајићево; Hungarian: Óécska) is a village in Serbia. It is located in the Zrenjanin municipality, in the Central Banat District, Vojvodina province. The village has a Serb ethnic majority (96.29%) and its population numbering 1,999 people (2002 census).

== Name ==
Names in other languages: Hungarian: Óécska, German: Alt-Etschka.

== History ==
Stajićevo was founded in 1922 and was settled by Serb families from Elemir, Aradac, Farkaždin, Ečka, Taraš, Kumane, Botoš, and Orlovat. Whole families came in a new village, which is founded in park of count Lazar d’Echka, respectively it of his successor Felix d’Harnoncourt; the streets received those names, where they came from: Elemirski sokak (Elemir’ corner), Aradački sokak, Farkaždinski sokak, Taraški sokak, Kumanovski and Botoški sokak. Them guided orthodox priest with name Stajić from village Taraš and from him became name this new village. He is buried in Stajićevo on cemetery. Until 1925, about 200 houses was built, which were populated by 1,000 inhabitants of Serb ethnicity. In 1991, a notorious concentration camp was created by Serbs for Croatian POWs and civilians from Vukovar known as the Stajićevo camp (Logor Stajićevo). Former prisoners from Vukovar visited this place on farm Livade on 22. April, 2009.

== Historical population ==
- 1961: 1,413
- 1971: 1,607
- 1981: 1,993
- 1991: 2,058
- 2002: 1,999

== See also ==
- List of places in Serbia
- List of cities, towns and villages in Vojvodina
