= Qyshk =

Qyshk Ćuška
- Village
- Location in Kosovo
- Country: Kosovo
- District: Peja
- Municipality: Peja

Population (2024)
  - Total: 1,075
- Time zone: UTC+1 (CET)
  - Summer (DST): UTC+2 (CEST)

Qyshk (in Albanian) or Ćuška (Serbian Cyrillic: Ћушка) is a village near Peja, in western Kosovo. It is inhabited predominantly by ethnic Albanians.

== History ==
In May 1999, during the Kosovo War, the Jackals paramilitary unit massacred civilians in the village, leading to 41 deaths and 3 injuries. Members of this unit are now facing sentences.

== Notable people ==
- Agim Çeku, Former Minister of Kosovo Security Force
