= Torak (Žitište) =

Torak Торак (Serbian) Torac (Romanian)
- Village (Selo)
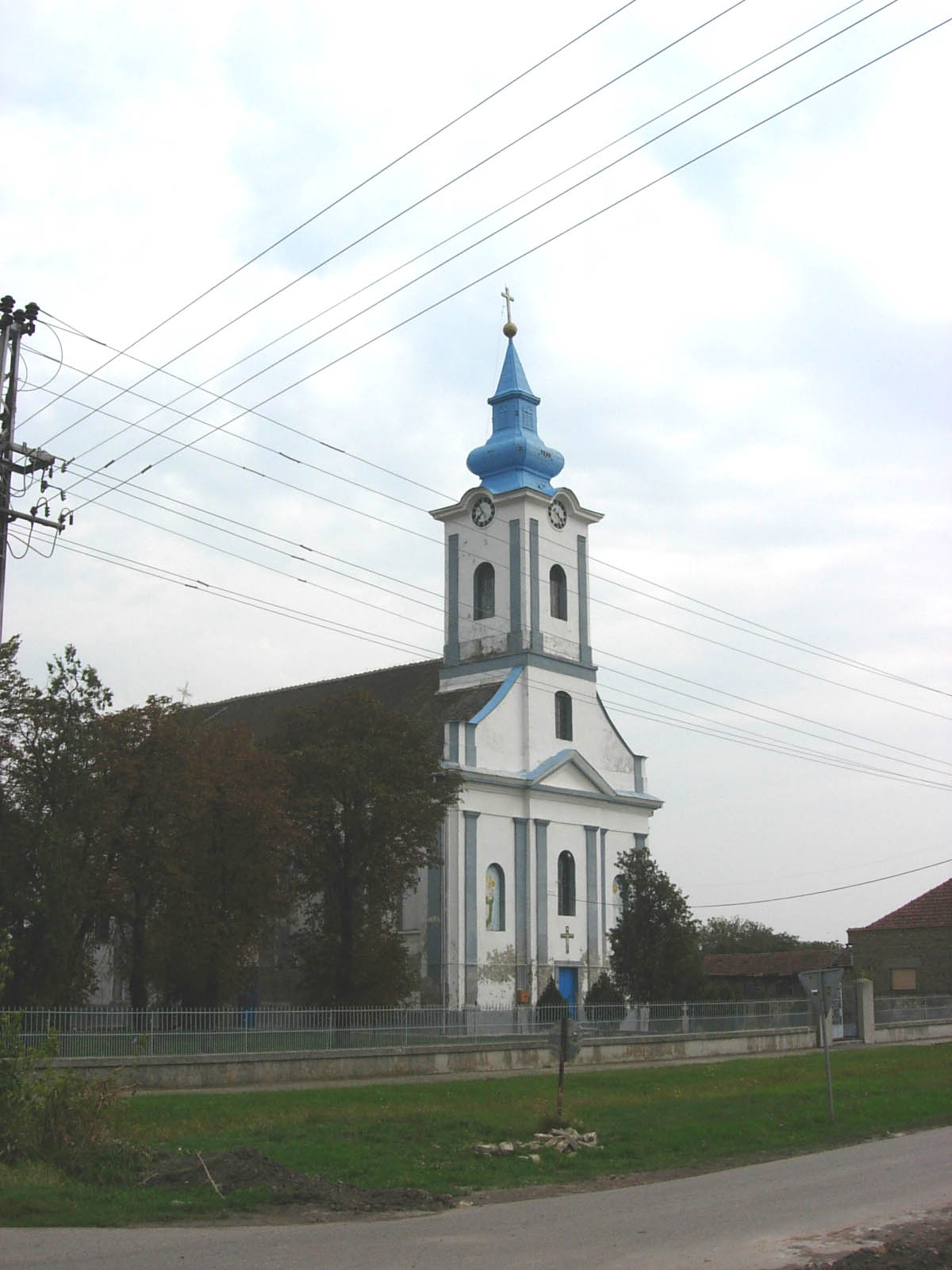
- The Romanian Orthodox Church in Mali Torak [Toracul Mic]

- Location within Serbia Torak (Serbia) Torak (Europe)
- Coordinates: 45°30′19″N 20°36′14″E
- Country: Serbia
- Province: Vojvodina
- District: Central Banat
- Municipalities: Žitište
- Elevation: 80 m (260 ft)

Population (2022)
  - Torak: 1,916
- Time zone: UTC+1 (CET)
  - Summer (DST): UTC+2 (CEST)
- Postal code: 23232
- Area code: +381(0)23
- Car plates: ZR

Torak (Serbian Cyrillic: Торак; Romanian: Torac; Hungarian: Bégatárnok), formerly known as Begejci (Serbian Cyrillic: Бегејци; Romanian: Begheiți), is a village located in the Žitište municipality, Central Banat District, Vojvodina, Serbia. The village has a population of 1,916 people (2022 census).

== Name ==
Historically, present-day Torak is formed from the union of two settlements – one named Mali Torak (Serbian Cyrillic: Мали Торак, Romanian: Toracul Mic, German: Kleintorak, Hungarian: Kis-Tárnok, "little Torak"), and another named Veliki Torak (Serbian Cyrillic: Велики Торак, Romanian: Toracul Mare, German: Großtorak, Hungarian: Nagy-Tárnok, "great Torak"). The road leading to the bridge over the Bega canal constituted the border between the two towns.

In 1946 the two parts were united under the common name Torak (Torac). The following year, 1947, the name was officially changed to Begejci (as Begheiți in Romanian).

The town was renamed Torak (Torac) in 2001.

== History ==
=== Early period to mid-16th century ===
Documents regarding the existence of the old site near where the current village stands today date from the first half of the 14th century. In the years 1332–1337, the town is mentioned under the Tarnuk-Tharnuk toponym in the register of the papal tithes which priests were paying to the pope in Rome. The register of papal tithes of the Catholic diocese archives are kept at Cenad (present-day Romania).

=== Under Habsburg monarchy: 1718–1867 ===
With the signing of the Treaty of Passarowitz (Požarevac; Pojarevaț) on 21 July 1718, the Habsburg war with the Ottoman Empire came to a close. Following the expulsion of the Turks, the regions north of the Danube became part of the Habsburg Empire. In fact, the area between Mureș, Tisa, Danube, and the Carpathians received the name Banat, becoming an Austrian province.

In 1751, the Court in Vienna transferred the Banat from a military to a civilian government. This year was also the beginning of a policy of colonization of thousands of Germans and other groups from the territories of the Holy Roman Empire into the territories conquered from the Turks, including the Banat region.

Colonizations of 1765–1767

Between 1765 and 1767, the Vienna Court forcibly colonized Romanians from one area of the Banat to another, in order to make room for colonists from other parts of the Holy Roman Empire. Thus, Romanians from Szakálháza or Săcălaz near Timișoara and Mândruloc (not far from the Mureș river, near Arad), were colonized by force to the area of present-day Torac. Once on the new territory of Torac, these colonists gave the old names to their new settlements, that is, Săcălaz (Toracul Mare) and Sefdin (Toracul Mic).

The settlements in the last quarter of the 18th century

On 13 August 1776, the Bishop of Timișoara Moise Putnic, consecrated the Toracul Mare church dedicated to St. George, its patron saint. The church has an Antimis of historical value, which has been given by the Patriarch of Ipek, bearing an inscription in old Slavonic, and brought by Bishop Moise Putnic on this special day.

In 1779, the Court in Vienna decided to place the Banat under the administration of Hungary. In this state reorganization, the Torontal county (comitat) is established. In this context, there is a return to the old toponyms, that is Săcălaz (Szakálház) became Nagy Torák (Toracul Mare), and Mândruloc acquired the name Kiss Torák (Toracul Mic), and both settlements became part of the Nagy Becskerek (Becicherecul-Mare) administrative circle.

There is an apocryphal story contained in several sources that the Habsburg ruler Joseph II (r. 1765–1790), on his visits to the southern parts of the empire and to the city of Timișoara, passed through Torac. Such a claim is not substantiated in the emperor's journal on these visits!

On 4 September 1782, the inhabitants of Itebei (Ittebe), Toracul Mare (Nagytorak), Toracul Mic (Kistorak), and Sângiura (Begei St. György) revolted, refusing to submit to the new owner of their villages, the Hungarian nobleman Izsák Kiss. To ameliorate the situation, the government sent a delegation and military assistance.

Serb historian Borislav Jankulov asserted (erroneously as it turns out) that in 1800 owner Izsák Kiss colonized German settlers in Torac and neighboring village of Sângiura [Begei St. György]. While there were Germans in both Toracul Mare and Toracul Mic over the course of time, it appears that the village in question at this time, 1800, was Klek (Begaföröl) and not Torac, according to the work of Antal Bodor, whose work is quoted as a source.

In 1807, Toracul Mare and Toracul Mic became the domain of Antal Kiss, in whose possession they will remain until 1840. With the death of Kiss Antal in 1840, Toracul Mare and Toracul Mic are managed by one of the members of the Kiss family, Ernö Kiss, who was shot in the city of Arad during the 1848–1849 revolution in the Habsburg Monarchy.

In spite of the gains made during this time, such as the abolition of serfdom, instead of a confiscation and distribution of the noblemen's land to the poor and needy inhabitants, the Court at Vienna sold the land to noblemen, such as Count Dukai Csekonics in the case of Toracul Mare and Toracul Mic. This situation will remain until the First World War.

=== The Dual Monarchy period: 1867–1914 ===
Cultural and Religious Life

Torac and the 1877–1878 Russo-Turkish War (The War For Romanian's Independence)

Romanians in Austria-Hungary followed with great interest and pride the participation of the Romanian Army in the 1877–1878 Russo-Turkish War, which was also Romania's war for independence. The Budapest government forbade the formation of Romanian committees of assistance for the wounded Romanian soldiers, instead allowing only individual collection drives. Presented with this situation, Romanians in the Dual Monarchy responded by engaging in such individual efforts of raising funds and especially medical supplies. Iudita Măcelariu from Sibiu, Transylvania, launched the first individual drive for medical aid to the wounded Romanian soldiers. Women in the Banat, as well as the Arad region, took up the cause and had undertaken their own individual drives.

Romanian press in Austria-Hungary routinely published letters and lists of donors from the individuals who have collected contributions for the wounded Romanian soldiers. Among these letters, Gazeta Transilvaniei from Brașov, in its 5/17 March issue, published the letter from Ana Fizeșanu, born Crețiunescu, the wife of the priest Pavel [Paul] Fizeșianu from Toracul Mic. Her list contained 52 names, the majority being from Toracul Mic, but also from Toracul Mare, who have donated a total of 19 forints, as well as lint supplies for dressing wounds.

Emigration

During the last decade of the nineteenth century and the beginning of the war in 1914, Austria-Hungary experienced a large drain of ethnic population, the majority going to North America, especially the United States and its industrial cities in the north, in pursuit of economic opportunities. Torac also experienced a loss of population, its inhabitants pursuing economic opportunities in many parts of the world. In the United States of America, Romanians settled relatively late. For example, in 1904 there were 12 Romanians in the city of South St. Paul, the state of Minnesota. According to the evidence presented by John Stefan, almost all of these Romanians were from Toracul Mare, Torontal county. Among the first Romanians settled in South St. Paul were Stefan Rosu, Pavel Alasu, Ioan Musteti, Andrei Musteti, Theodore Cinezan, Pavel Motoc, and Pavel Anuica. This trend in emigration from Torac (and other towns in the Banat region) continued over the course of history during periods of hard economic times and political instability.

The Bega Canal and Torac

In 1892 the Budapest Parliament appropriated the necessary funds to the government to dredge the lower Bega and turn it into a navigable waterway by introducing several locks in key locations on the canal. This project is finished in 1912. By this action, Torac is connected with Temesvár and Nagy Becskerek.

Until the turn of the twentieth century, the majority of the population of the two towns used the flowing water of the Bega canal for everyday consumption (drinking and cooking). Beginning in 1900, the first artesian wells were drilled in Torac. This appears to be the consequence of the dredging of the Bega canal under way at this point in time, an undertaking which rendered the canal's water unsafe for everyday consumption.

In 1910, the first large boat on the waters of the Bega canal passed by the town. Consequently, until the start of the First World War, inhabitants of Torac were able to travel to Timișoara and Nagy Becskerek by boat which had a daily schedule between the two major cities of the region. A passenger boat service to Nagy Becskerek (after World War II renamed Zrenjanin) continued until the mid-1960s when a bus service became the preferred mode of transportation by Toraceans to "the city" [la oraș].

In 1912, the current stone and concrete bridge was built over the Bega canal, located between Toracul Mare and Toracul Mic. Until this year, an unstable wooden bridge had been in use, "which the flowing water and ice moved it from place to place."

=== The World War I ===
World War I, the "war of national will", as the great historian Nicolae Iorga described it in his monumental work The History of Romanians, led to the fulfillment of the Romanian national aspirations for national union and liberation of the Romanian people under foreign rule. The Armistice of Belgrade and Peace of Paris, however, led to the division of the Banat. Western Banat, including Torontal County, with the villages of Toracul Mare and Toracul Mic, passes from Hungarian to Serbian authority, although all Banat, and therefore the Torăceans, fought for the Romanian national ideal. Thus Toracul Mare and Toracul Mic were further to remain under foreign domination.

During the war, the male inhabitants of military age were conscripted into the Austro-Hungarian Army. More than 60 inhabitants from Toracul Mare fell on the battlefield, mainly on the Galicia front. On 6 September 1941, the inhabitants of the village raised a monument to the fallen during the 1914–1918 war. The monument contains the names of these heroes. From Toracul Mic also, many have fallen on the field of battle.

In the closing days of the First World War, as the Austro-Hungarian Monarchy was breaking up, national minorities of the multinational empire were establishing organizations which eventually would take over the governmental administration at the local level. In the Banat region, Romanian National Guard units were also established with the headquarters in Arad, on the Mureș river. The villages of Toracul Mare and Toracul Mic also organized such guard units to provide law and order in the absence of a central governing authority. In fact, during this time there was some devastation of commercial enterprises (owned by non-Romanian elements) in the villages, which influenced many to leave soon afterwards. One of the individuals who became commander of the national guard in Toracul Mic was Vichentie Petru. In the Romanian government's official Royal Decree document published in the 5 July 1941 Monitorul Oficial among the Banateans decorated with the King Ferdinand I Medal (Medalia "Ferdinand I") was Vichentie Petru, who had been living in Timișoara, Romania, since the 1920s.

=== The World War II ===
On the morning of 6 April 1941, Axis forces bombed and invaded Yugoslavia. By the end of the month, Yugoslavia ceased to exist as a state, having been divided among Hungary, Bulgaria, and Italy.

The Delegation to Timișoara and Bucharest, April 1941

Before the invasion and the dissolution of Yugoslavia, Hungary's territorial aspirations have been well known in the Yugoslav Banat among the Romanians. After the collapse of Yugoslavia and the march of Hungarian troops into Bačka, leaders of the Banat Romanians were very worried about the consequences of a possible Hungarian occupation of the Yugoslav Banat.

In these circumstances, on 14 April 1941 a delegation of 80 leaders and farmers from the northern part of the Yugoslav Banat arrived in Timișoara. Among members of this delegation were the priests Ion Baloș and Todor Baloș, and teachers Dumitru Ciobanu, Gheorghe Stancu, Ion Popescu, Pompiliu Plăeșeanu, and Ioan Melinescu, all of them from the two villages of Torac. The mission of this delegation was to ask the Romanian authorities to make necessary interventions to incorporate the Yugoslav Banat into Romania. The reason of this request was the need to protect the Romanian population due to the lack of a Yugoslav central authority and the fear of a Hungarian takeover. A telegram was sent to the Romanian Head of the State, General Ion Antonescu, and then a smaller delegation from this group, traveled to Bucharest. Their hope was to have meetings with government members.

Arriving in the Romanian capital, three days later, the Toracean delegation met on 17 April with the Romanian state leader, General Ion Antonescu, and submitted a memorandum of grievances of the Romanians from the Yugoslav Banat. The same day the delegation led by the priest Ion Baloș, school director Dumitru Ciobanu, Petru Lațcu (Boancă), student at the Timișoara Politechnic School (and, later, as a soldier in the Romanian army, would fall on the Russian front), Ristea Andrei, Teodor Baloș, Traian Cristeț (Cocoru), also met with Romania's minister of propaganda (Ministrul Propagandei Naționale a României), Professor Nichifor Crainic.

Shortly after, Bucharest sent to Berlin a memorandum concerning the Yugoslav Banat question. Attached to this memorandum, the Romanian government included the Timișoara police list of the names of the 80 members of the delegation.

Because Berlin had the final decision on the fate of the Yugoslav Banat, and the need to keep both of its allies, Bucharest and Budapest, loyal in its planned actions against the Soviet Union, the status of this region was postponed, to be determined at the end of the world conflagration.

The "Six"

On the morning of 14 May 1945, outside of Toracul Mare, six villagers (four women–one of whom was pregnant–and two men) were massacred by a group of Yugoslav Partisans. Returning from Romania after they had visited relatives who took refuge there, the victims entered the village at dawn. Since the village itself was under blockade (a constant occurrence during the first half of 1945), the group was apprehended by Partisans and taken to the town hall where they were interrogated. Thereafter, with their hands tied behind their backs with wire, they were escorted outside the village under Partisan armed escort. If the stated destination was the area's military headquarters in nearby Itebej, for further interrogation, as it was publicly stated later, they never reached it. Walking on the dam along the Bega canal toward Itebej, they were shot when they reached the area known as Crani (Kranj). Afterwards, in an effort to justify this dastardly act, the authorities made it known that the six were "shot while attempting to escape"!

The day of 15 May 1945 was a day of mourning in Toracul Mare and neighboring Toracul Mic. Young and old from the two villages took part at the funeral of the six innocent victims murdered by the Partisans. The funeral service was officiated by the four priests of the two villages–Ioan Farca, Ioan Frișcan, Ion Baloș, and Todor Baloș.

The poet and journalist Vichentie Avram, from Toracul Mic, photographed the funeral procession and service. Because the situation was very tense, Avram immediately developed the negatives, made the photographs, and in the middle of the night distributed them to the grieving families. The events of the following day, 16 May, justified his hurried action. Agents of the secret police (OZNa), called on him. Since Avram no longer possessed either the photographs or the negatives, for whatever reason, OZNa agents did not go to the families of the victims to impound the material in question. Thus, one can argue cynically that the crime had been "investigated", although not to punish but rather to protect the guilty and to intimidate the families of the victims and the villagers from pursuing the matter any further.

It should also be reiterated that in the closing months of World War II crossing the Romanian-Yugoslav frontier was relatively easy (as already discussed above). Individuals who went to Romania, did not go only to see family members who took refuge there, but also to visit relatives who were Romanian citizens and lived across the border, or only to purchase necessary staples unavailable or scarce on the Yugoslav side. At the Romanian frontier, Romanian guards were tolerant toward the Yugoslav neighbors, and even helped the Romanians from the Yugoslav Banat. Since the Romanian-Yugoslav frontier agreement of November 1923, residents of frontier villages who possessed property on either side of the border, could legally cross into the other country without any difficulty. Thus, crossing the frontier was a mere formality.

Needless to say, the news of the atrocity committed in Toracul Mare, also reached Romania. Afterwards, Romanian frontier guards would often escort villagers returning to Torac from Romania and traveling on the old dirt road (known as drumul mare or the Timișoara-Becicherecul Mare road, originally established under Austria-Hungary) to the outskirts of the village, to ensure that they had reached home safely. Eventually, these crossings petered out as the frontier was stabilized and tensions increased between the two countries.

=== Post-WWII period ===
Social and Cultural Developments

The town's amateur folk group and its folk music orchestra "Lira", was featured in the 1967 movie The 25th Hour starring international movie actors Anthony Quinn and Virna Lisi, and directed by French director Henri Verneuil. A Carlo Ponti production, the film is an adaptation of the novel of the same title by Constantin Virgil Gheorghiu, Romanian Uniate refugee priest. During the shooting of the movie in 1966, 80 amateur members of Torac's Cultural Society "Flacăra", have taken part, and are featured in the opening scenes of the film. The courtyard scenes of the celebration of the baptismal have been filmed near Ecica (Ečka) Ečka, another Romanian-inhabited town close to the city of Zrenjanin.

During 1966–1967, and in preparation for the bicentennial anniversary of the colonization of some of the descendants from Sefdin and Săcălaz, a new cultural hall was erected on the site of the previous edifice (which had been built in 1953, but had numerous structural problems). Thus, a building which should have lasted decades was torn down a dozen years after it was finished, at considerable cost to the town's people.

In August–September 1967 the town also celebrated the 200th anniversary of the colonization of some of the descendants from Sefdin and Săcălaz.

1967, August. For the official celebration of town's anniversary, 5,000 postcards with various images of people and town buildings, 2,000 information flyers (pliante) about the town's historical highlights, 1,000 invitations to individuals born in the town or other guests to the festivities, and 1,000 commemorative pins.

1967, 1–2 September. The official celebration of the "bicentennial of the town's colonization" with the presence of guests from Romania as well. The celebration was officially authorized by the state, and subsequently it became an annual event which, however, was transformed into the town's "Socialist holiday".

Tragedy

1968, summer. In an argument, Pavel Văianțu (Pali) kills his son George and buries him in the backyard. A few days later, Pali confesses to the murder.

The 1970s and 1980s

The 1971 Census, according to one source, registered 1,236 households and 4,811 inhabitants. Of these, 4,069 were of Romanian nationality (ethnic origins). As was the situation during the Austro-Hungarian era, so too during this period, the official census figures were manipulated. According to another source, there were 4,817 inhabitants living in 1,391 households in Torac.

=== Since 1991 ===
During the 1990s, Yugoslavia was engulfed in a series of civil wars, or "wars of cessation". Torac, or at the time still known as Begejci, has the dubious distinction of having been drawn into the era of terrible deeds which occurred during this period of tragic events. Torac became a site where the Begejci camp was set up outside the town. This camp, operated by elements of JNA (Yugoslav People's Army) was established in the fall of 1991 to where hundreds of detainees (Croat soldiers and civilians) were brought especially following the fall of the Croat town of Vukovar on 18 November 1991. The number of detainees fluctuated over the course of the months the camp was operational. The ICTY's indictment against Slobodan Milošević states, in part: "e. Military barracks in Begejci in Serbia run by the JNA, approximately two hundred and sixty detainees."

On New Year's Day 1992, the American news agency Associated Press, published the following information: "Captured Croats were forced to construct a prisoner cage in the village of Begejci, 60 miles north of Belgrade, said Zelimir Loncar, a psychiatrist in Vukovar's hospital. Reminiscent of World War II concentration camps, it had [sic!] barbed wire fences patrolled by armed guards, dogs and searchlights, he said."

In the closing days of the winter of 1991, because of fear of "diversionary action" from the Croats, the town's cultural center building is guarded by soldiers of the JNA. There is no evidence that the locals were involved in this terrible episode in the history of this town, something it could have been spared by the authorities. That the town's name was eventually changed in 2001 to the historical name is not an indication that it was done to hide the truth of what occurred in 1991–1992 (as some Croat sources claim), at least not done so by the locals of Torac. The movement for the name change has begun well before the Yugoslav Wars. Why the authorities finally relented to the name change is a matter of conjecture.

== Demographics ==
=== Historical population ===
Until 1946, present day Torak (Torac) was two separate villages. Therefore, the population figures are presented in three categories: the total number, followed (where available) by those of each village, as noted: [T] = Toracul Mare; [t] = Toracul Mic.

- 1773: 163 houses [t]
- 1832: 5,368 = 2,812 [T]; 2,556 [t]
- 1843: 2,690 [t]
- 1854: 2,987 [t]
- 1869: 6,330 = 3,371 [T]; 2,959 [t]
- 1871: 6,090 = 3,090 [T]; 3,000 [t]
- 1880: 6,281 = 2,907 [t]
- 1890: 6,558 = 2,993 [t]
- 1900: 6,490 = 3,549 [T]; 2,941 [t]
- 1910: 5,199 = 3,349 [T]; 2,850 [t]
- 1921: 5,952 = 2,786 [T]; 2,886 [t]
- 1931: 5,422 total
- 1948: 4,945
- 1953: 5,016
- 1961: 5,198
- 1971: 4,817
- 1981: 4,289
- 1991: 3,700
- 2002: 2,850
- 2011: 2,291
- 2022: 1,916

=== Ethnic groups ===
According to data from the 2022 census, ethnic groups in the village include:

- 1,055 (55%) Romanians
- 496 (25.9%) Serbs
- 179 (9.3%) Roma
- Others/Undeclared/Unknown

== Gallery ==
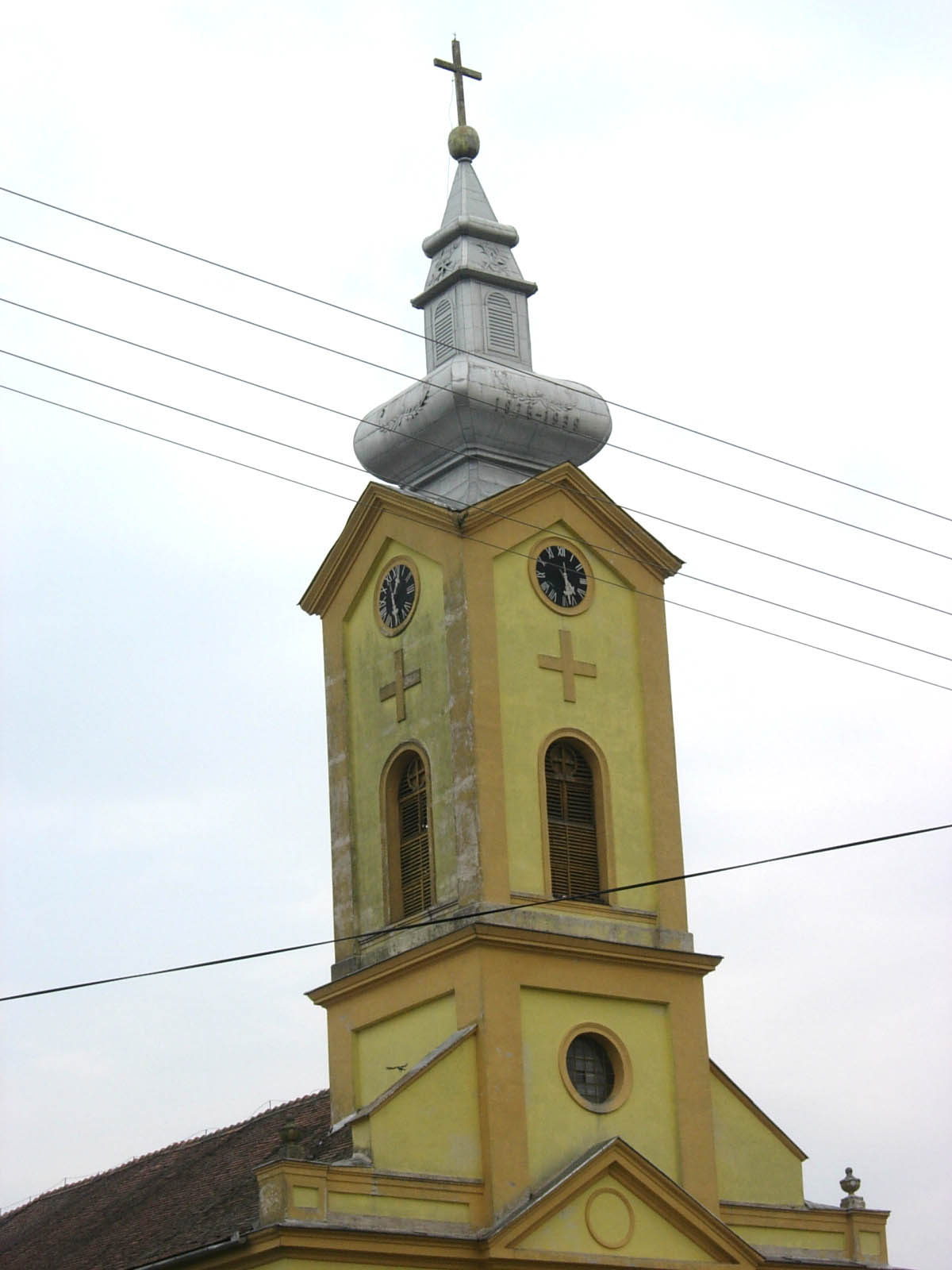
The Romanian Orthodox church in Veliki Torak (Toracul Mare).

== Notable people ==
- Brižitka Molnar (born 1985), Serbian volleyball player
- Emil Petrovici (1899–1968), Romanian linguist, dialectologist and Slavist

== See also ==
https://web.archive.org/web/20100927231811/http://www.torak.in.rs/

- List of places in Serbia
- List of cities, towns and villages in Vojvodina
