= Ćuška massacre =

1999 mass massacre in Ćuška, near Peja, Kosovo, Yugoslavia

- Location: 42.6572°N 20.3389°E; Ćuška, AP Kosovo, FR Yugoslavia (modern Kosovo)
- Date: 14 May 1999; 27 years ago (Central European Time)
- Target: Kosovar Albanians
- Attack type: Mass killing
- Deaths: 41
- Injuries: 3
- Perpetrators: Serbian security forces, Yugoslav army, "Jackals" paramilitary group, Serbian Police Reserves and Territorial Defense

The Ćuška massacre (Albanian: Masakra e Qyshkut, Serbian: Масакр у Ћушкој, romanized: Masakr u Ćuškoj) was the killing of 41 Kosovo Albanian civilians, all men aged 19 to 69, by Serbian security forces, the Yugoslav Army and paramilitaries on 14 May 1999 during the Kosovo War. On 13 March 2010, the Serbian war crimes prosecutor announced that nine men had been arrested for their role in the massacre and stated that a total of 26 men were under investigation for murder and theft at Ćuška.

== Background ==
Ćuška is a village close to the city of Peja. The village had 200 houses and about 2,000 residents, predominantly Albanians. In the early morning of May 14, 1999, Serbian security forces descended on the small village of Ćuška. Once there the women and children were separated from the men, private property was systematically stolen, and identification papers were destroyed. The forces then divided the men into three groups of about ten and taken into three separate houses, where they were gunned down with automatic weapons. Each of the houses were then set on fire. In each of the three houses, one man survived.

The motivation for the massacre at Ćuška remains unclear. Agim Çeku, a Kosovo Liberation Army (KLA) commander, was a village native and his father who was residing there was killed in the massacre; however many from the Serb forces stated that his death was not the primary purpose of the attack.

== Court proceedings ==
On 13 March 2010 Serbian War crime prosecution office arrested nine members of paramilitary of the "Jackals" paramilitary group. Serbian War crime prosecution office launched an investigation against 26 individuals for murder and theft at Cuska.

On 20 January 2012 a district court in Stockholm, Sweden sentenced Milić Martinović, a 34-year-old former Serb policeman, to lifetime imprisonment for his role in the massacre. Martinović, who was arrested in Sweden in April 2010, was ruled guilty of aggravated crimes against humanity, including murder, attempted murder and aggravated arson, in connection with the massacre, the Stockholm District Court said.

Martinović had been a member of the special PJP police force that entered Ćuška on 14 May 1999 in search of "terrorists". Armed and in uniform, he was among the troops who took a large number of people captive, killed 29 of the 40 people murdered there that day, attempted to kill three others, burned down houses and manhandled civilians, the court said in its judgment. The court documents describe how he repeatedly stood guard as his comrades shot and killed civilians and how he fired at the ground and forced residents to hand over gold and other valuables, but they do not show Martinović to have killed any victim. Newspaper reports in Sweden state he was expected to appeal the judgment.

== See also ==
- List of massacres in Yugoslavia
