= Sremska Mitrovica Prison =

Prison in Serbia

Sremska Mitrovica Prison (Serbian: Казнено-поправни завод у Сремској Митровици, Kazneno-popravni zavod u Sremskoj Mitrovici) is the biggest prison in Serbia, consisting of two facilities. It is situated in Sremska Mitrovica, Vojvodina province. During the Yugoslavian Civil Wars it was used as a concentration camp for thousands of Croatian and Bosnian prisoners amidst allegations of torture, prisoner abuse and rape.

== History ==
=== Foundation and early history ===
It was formed by the order of Habsburg emperor Franz Joseph between 1895 and 1899. From 1918 to 1941, it functioned under administration of the Kingdom of Yugoslavia and after 1944 under administration of the Socialist Federal Republic of Yugoslavia.

=== Yugoslav Wars ===
During the Yugoslav Wars, some Croatian and Bosniak prisoners of war were kept in this prison. The main prison facility; the largest known in Serbia, was open from November 1991 to August 1992 and was a scene where many prisoners were tortured, abused and raped. At least 25 prisoners were killed in front of witnesses, but the actual number is believed to be much higher. International organizations collected detailed information from reports, inspections and survivors regarding Sremska Mitrovica prison.

Sometimes, the guards would hold a mock trial and beat the accused. One prisoner was found dead the morning after such a trial. An unknown number of prisoners were beaten to death. According to one survivor, two prisoners in the same room died due to beatings and were left to lie there for 20 hours with the other prisoners. Other prisoners also reported seeing prisoners being beaten or tortured to death. According to the U.S. Department of State's declassified materials, at least 18 prisoners were tortured to death. Another survivor claims that people were killed, but not in front of witnesses, while at least two others said they witnessed at least two deaths. Some prisoners were transferred to solitary confinement cells and never returned.

Throughout 1992, prisoners were regularly exchanged. On August 7, 1992, an agreement was reached between Yugoslav Prime Minister Milan Panić and Croatian Prime Minister Franjo Gregurić in Budapest for a mass exchange of prisoners. About 500 prisoners from the KPD were to be exchanged at Nemetin, near Osijek. During the ride towards their destination, many were mistreated. On August 14, approximately 1,500 prisoners from both sides were exchanged.

The prison reportedly no longer kept war prisoners after August 13. Some of the inmates survived for nine months in the prison. According to the Croatian Society of Serb Concentration Camp Inmates (HDLSKL), 8,000 Croats went through Serbian prison facilities, 300 of whom never returned. The Sremska Mitrovica prison was prominently mentioned in ICTY trials to Slobodan Milošević and Veselin Šljivančanin, as many survivors testified there. Following the democratic changes in Serbia, the prison function was also expanded to hold Serb war criminals from the wars in Croatia and Bosnia.
