= Stajićevo camp =

Prisoner of war camp in Serbia

Coordinates: 45°16′29″N 20°28′01″E

Site information
- Type: Prisoner-of-war camp

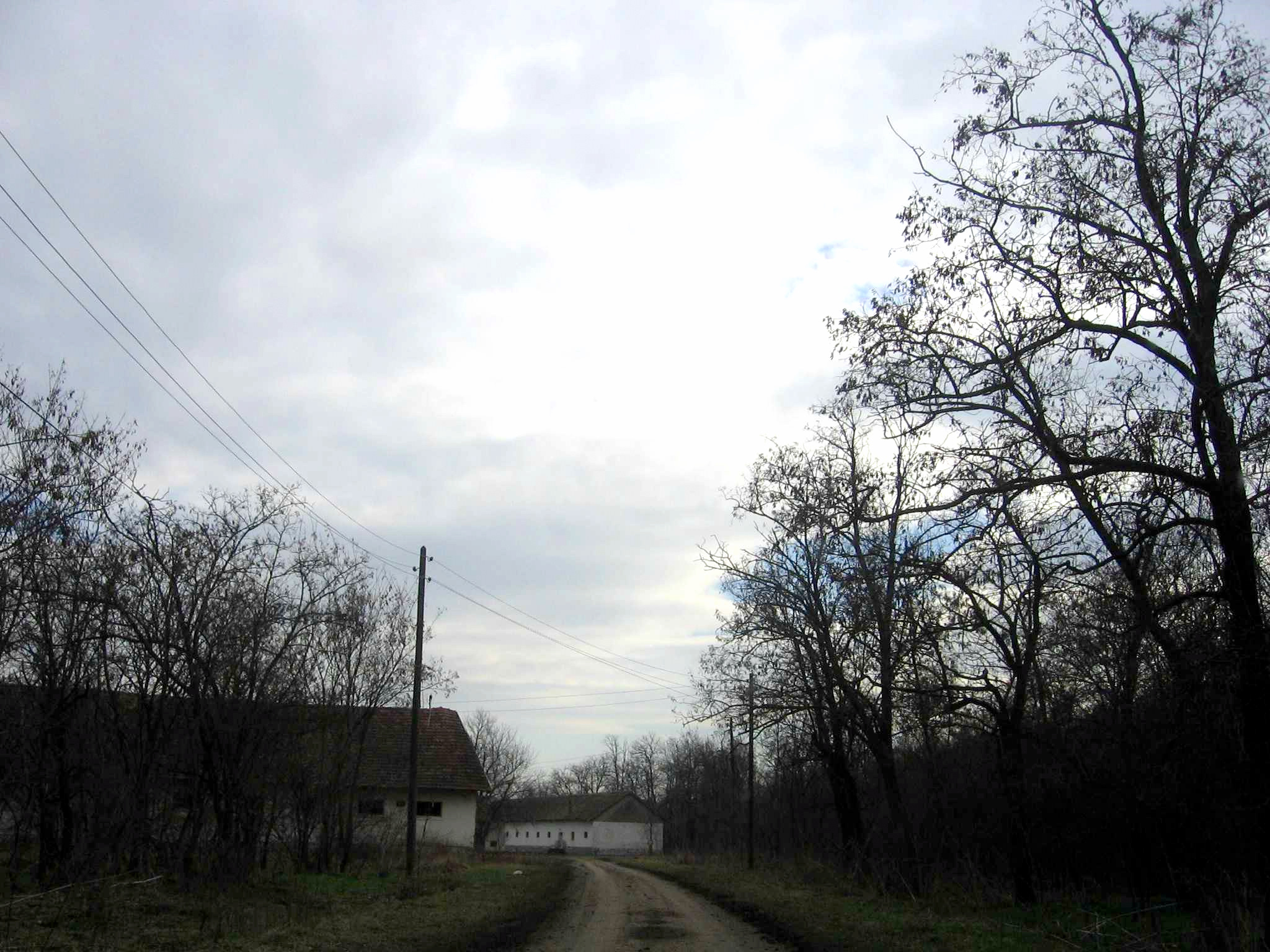
The agricultural cooperative of Livade near Stajićevo was the site of the internment camp in 1992.

The Stajićevo camp (Logor Stajićevo) was an agricultural farm in Stajićevo near Zrenjanin, Serbia (then part of SFR Yugoslavia, then FRY) where Croatian prisoners of war and civilians were kept by Serbian authorities. The camp also acted as a transit facility where prisoners were taken before being moved to the Sremska Mitrovica camp. Individual reports have said that 1500 people were held there. The ICTY's figure for the camp was 1700 detainees.

The camp was cited in the International Criminal Tribunal for the former Yugoslavia's case against then Serbian president Slobodan Milošević. Goran Hadžić is also indicted on charges by the ICTY related to the camp.

Prisoners at the camp included people captured in the Battle of Vukovar such as Fred Matić, who described it as an animal barn where living conditions were the worst in his experience of three Serbian camps, and the future Croatian parliamentarian Ivica Pančić's father and brother.

== Conditions at the camp ==
Former prisoners at the camp reported being beaten, with at least one claiming to have received electric shocks by guards. According to reports, the White Eagle paramilitary was also active at the camp.

According to the reports, the age of the detainees ranged from 8 to 80. At least 17 people were killed in the camp. The conditions in the camp were generally poor: people had to sleep on the concrete floor in November on their first day in the camp, but were later given a blanket. In the first 10 days, they received only two meals a day, mostly tea and bread with cheese. There were also no toilets in the farm, so the detainees had to relieve themselves on the floor. After 10 days, latrines were finally added in the camp. After five days, they were given water to wash themselves.

Detainees were released in a prisoner exchange in January 1992, after spending over three months in the camp.
