= Begejci camp =

Former Serbian detention camp (1991)

Coordinates: 45.5°N 20.6°E

Begejci camp on the map of Serbia

The Begejci camp (Logor Begejci) was a detention camp established in September–October 1991 in Begejci near Zrenjanin, Serbia (then part of SFR Yugoslavia, then FRY) where Croatian prisoners of war and civilians were kept by Serbian authorities during the Croatian War of Independence. The detainees were mostly brought from Vukovar and some were later moved to other camps. At least three people are known to have died there. The camp was opened in the autumn of 1991, and held approximately 600 prisoners. The ICTY cited 260 detainees in its indictment against Slobodan Milošević.

In December 1991, approximately 300 prisoners were returned to Croatia as part of a prisoner exchange. Prisoners at the camp lived in stalls and were kept there without heat, until a visit by the International Red Cross resulted in some blankets being provided.

The Serbian reporter Danica Vučenić received the Zoran Mamula Award for journalism for her 2003 report on the camp.
