= United Nations Security Council Resolution 771 =

UN Security Council Resolution 771
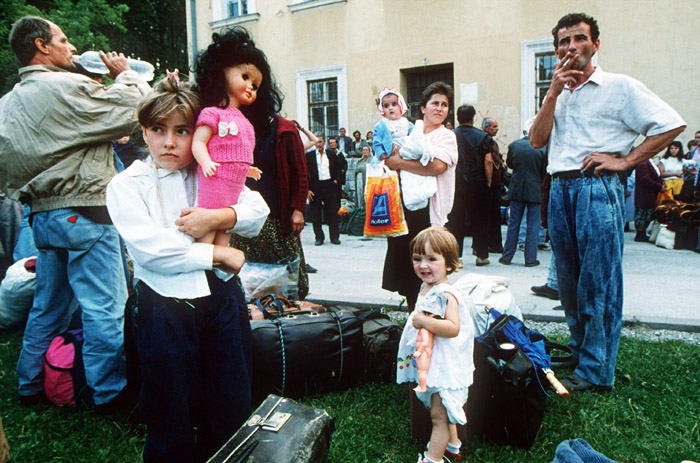
- Refugees in Bosnia and Herzegovina
- Date: 13 August 1992
- Meeting no.: 3,106
- Code: S/RES/771 (Document)
- Subject: Former Yugoslavia
- Voting summary: 15 voted for; None voted against; None abstained
- Result: Adopted

Security Council composition
- Permanent members: China; France; Russia; United Kingdom; United States
- Non-permanent members: Austria; Belgium; Cape Verde; Ecuador; Hungary; India; Japan; Morocco; Venezuela; Zimbabwe

United Nations Security Council resolution 771, adopted unanimously on 13 August 1992, after reaffirming resolutions 713 (1991), 721 (1991), 724 (1991), 727 (1992), 740 (1992), 743 (1992), 749 (1992), 752 (1992), 757 (1992), 758 (1992), 760 (1992), 761 (1992), 762 (1992), 764 (1992), 769 (1992) and 770 (1992), the council expressed concern at and condemned widespread violations of international humanitarian law in the territory of the former Yugoslavia and in particular, Bosnia and Herzegovina.

The resolution cited cases of "mass forcible expulsion" and deportation of civilians, abuse in detention centres, deliberate attacks on non-combatants, hospitals and ambulances which impeded the delivery of humanitarian aid to affected areas. The council strongly condemned the violations, including that of ethnic cleansing (the first such resolution to do so), demanding all parties cease and desist from violating international law. It further demanded international organisations, particularly the International Committee of the Red Cross, be given immediate and unrestricted access to camps, prisons and detention centres.

Resolution 771 then called on member states and international organisations to collect information concerning violations of humanitarian law and the Geneva Conventions and to make it available to the council. It asked the Secretary-General Boutros Boutros-Ghali to collate and summarise the information into a report that would also make recommendations that might be an appropriate response to the information.

Finally, acting under Chapter VII, thus making it legally enforceable, the council demanded all parties and military forces present in the former Yugoslavia and Bosnia and Herzegovina comply with the terms under the current resolution, otherwise the council would consider further measures it could take. A commission of experts was established in Resolution 780 to assess the information gathered.

== See also ==
- Breakup of Yugoslavia
- Bosnian War
- Croatian War of Independence
- List of United Nations Security Council Resolutions 701 to 800 (1991–1993)
- Slovenian Independence War
- Yugoslav Wars
- List of United Nations Security Council Resolutions related to the conflicts in former Yugoslavia
