= United Nations Security Council Resolution 762 =

UN Security Council Resolution 762
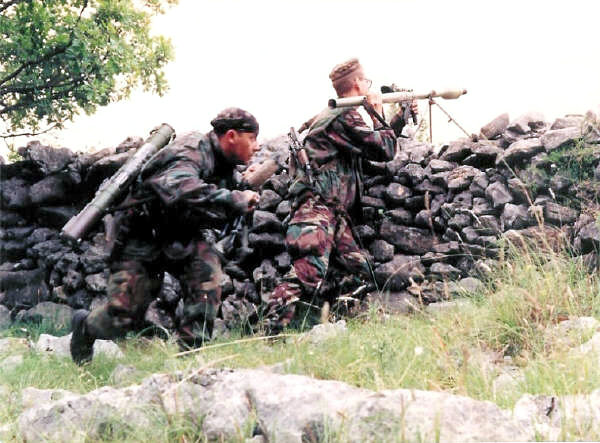
- Croatian soldiers
- Date: 30 June 1992
- Meeting no.: 3,088
- Code: S/RES/762 (Document)
- Subject: Croatia
- Voting summary: 15 voted for; None voted against; None abstained
- Result: Adopted

Security Council composition
- Permanent members: China; France; Russia; United Kingdom; United States
- Non-permanent members: Austria; Belgium; Cape Verde; Ecuador; Hungary; India; Japan; Morocco; Venezuela; Zimbabwe

United Nations Security Council resolution 762, adopted unanimously on 30 June 1992, after reaffirming resolutions 713 (1991), 721 (1991), 724 (1991), 727 (1992), 740 (1992) 743 (1992), 749 (1992), 752 (1992), 757 (1992), 758 (1992), 760 (1992) and 761 (1992), the Council urged all parties to honour their commitments to the United Nations plan in former Yugoslavia and complete a cessation of hostilities.

It also urged Croatia to withdraw its army from its recent offensive in Dalmatia to positions held before 21 June 1992, and urged the remaining units of the Yugoslav People's Army as well as the Serbian territorial defence forces in Croatia, and also the irregular forces to strictly comply with the United Nations peacekeeping plan.

Resolution 762 also recommended the establishment of a Joint Commission, consisting of representatives of the Croatian government and local Serbs, which should consult "if necessary or appropriate" with the authorities in Belgrade as to its functions regarding the monitoring of police authorities and the withdrawal of both armies from the United Nations Protected Areas and "pink zones" outside of United Nations control. It also authorised an increase of 120 civilian police and 60 military officers to the United Nations Protection Force.

Reaffirming the arms embargo and the consequences that the collapse of the United Nations plan in Yugoslavia could have, the Council called on all parties again to co-operate with the Conference on Yugoslavia with its aim to reaching a political settlement consistent with the principles of the Organization for Security and Co-operation in Europe.

Croatia did not comply and did not withdraw its army from Miljevci Plateau.

== See also ==
- Breakup of Yugoslavia
- Bosnian War
- Croatian War of Independence
- List of United Nations Security Council Resolutions 701 to 800 (1991–1993)
- Slovenian Independence War
- Yugoslav Wars
