= United Nations Security Council Resolution 761 =

UN Security Council Resolution 761
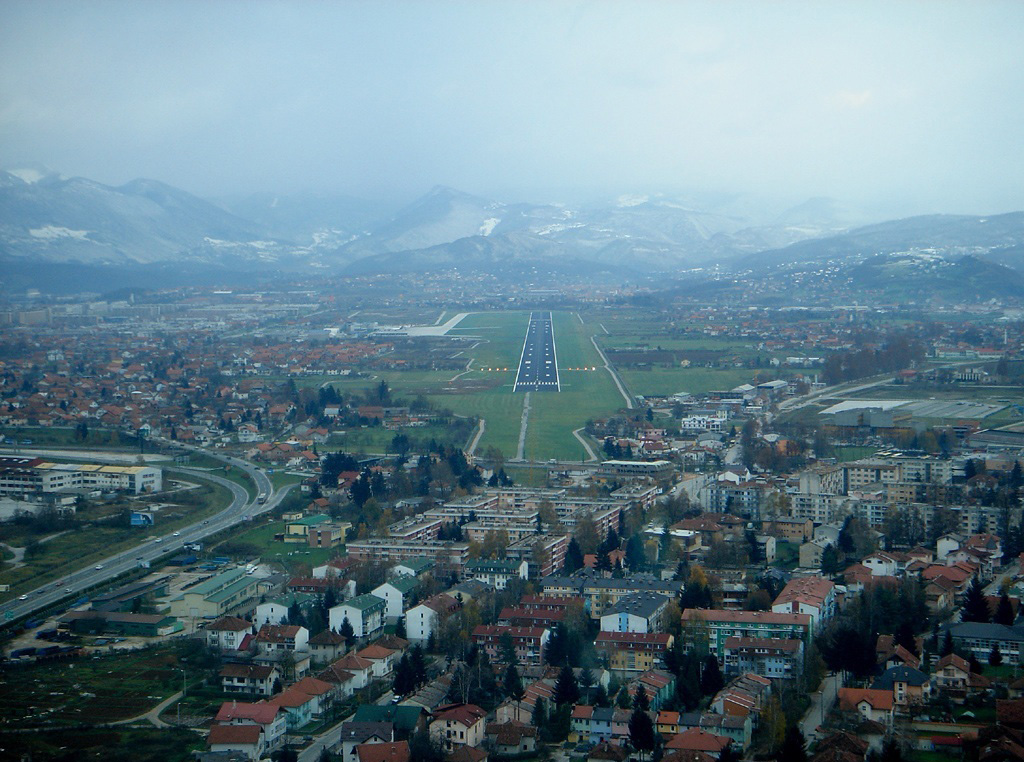
- View of Sarajevo airport
- Date: 29 June 1992
- Meeting no.: 3,087
- Code: S/RES/761 (Document)
- Subject: Bosnia and Herzegovina
- Voting summary: 15 voted for; None voted against; None abstained
- Result: Adopted

Security Council composition
- Permanent members: China; France; Russia; United Kingdom; United States
- Non-permanent members: Austria; Belgium; Cape Verde; Ecuador; Hungary; India; Japan; Morocco; Venezuela; Zimbabwe

United Nations Security Council Resolution 761, adopted unanimously on 29 June 1992, after reaffirming Resolutions 713 (1991), 721 (1991), 724 (1991), 727 (1992), 740 (1992) 743 (1992), 749 (1992), 752 (1992), 757 (1992), 758 (1992) and 760 (1992), the Council authorised the Secretary-General to immediately deploy additional elements of the United Nations Protection Force in Croatia and Bosnia and Herzegovina during the Yugoslav Wars.

The Council authorised the deployment to ensure the security and functioning of Sarajevo International Airport to facilitate the delivery of humanitarian aid, appealing to all sides to co-operate with the Force in the reopening of the airport. It also called on the parties to observe the ceasefire and co-operate with the Force, international organisations and Member States in providing aid.

Resolution 761 increased the Force in Sarajevo to one infantry battalion, while Resolution 764 would increase it to two. The Force would protect the airport since it, and the capital, came under attack from Bosnian Serbs on 5 June 1992.

== See also ==
- Breakup of Yugoslavia
- Bosnian War
- Croatian War of Independence
- List of United Nations Security Council Resolutions 701 to 800 (1991–1993)
- Slovenian Independence War
- Yugoslav Wars
