= United Nations Security Council Resolution 758 =

UN Security Council Resolution 758
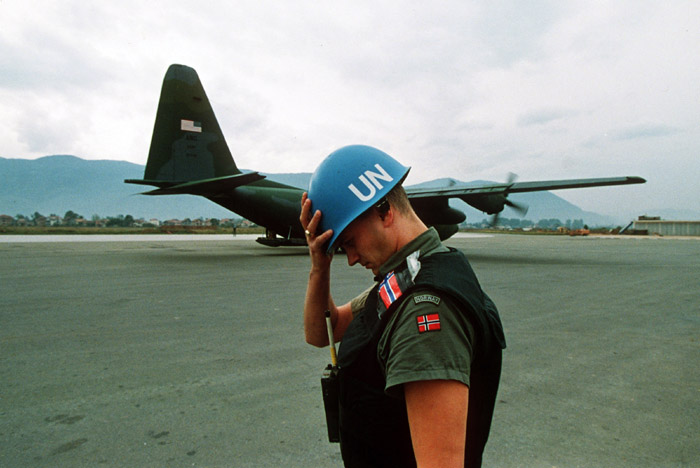
- Member of UNPROFOR at Sarajevo airport (1992)
- Date: 8 June 1992
- Meeting no.: 3,083
- Code: S/RES/758 (Document)
- Subject: Bosnia and Herzegovina
- Voting summary: 15 voted for; None voted against; None abstained
- Result: Adopted

Security Council composition
- Permanent members: China; France; Russia; United Kingdom; United States
- Non-permanent members: Austria; Belgium; Cape Verde; Ecuador; Hungary; India; Japan; Morocco; Venezuela; Zimbabwe

United Nations Security Council resolution 758, adopted unanimously on 8 June 1992, after reaffirming resolutions 713 (1991), 721 (1991), 724 (1991), 727 (1992), 740 (1992) 743 (1992), 749 (1992), 752 (1992) and 757 (1992), the council, in accordance with a report by the Secretary-General Boutros Boutros-Ghali, decided to enlarge the mandate and strength of the United Nations Protection Force (UNPROFOR) in former Yugoslavia.

The council authorised the secretary-general to deploy military observers and other personnel, but to seek permission from the council in order to send further personnel towards the protection force after the necessary conditions for the Force have been fulfilled, including a ceasefire. It also condemned all parties responsible for the violation of the ceasefire, urging them to comply with the aforementioned ceasefire.

Finally, the resolution urged all parties to guarantee the safety of humanitarian workers and the delivery of aid to Sarajevo and other areas in Bosnia and Herzegovina. The parties did not agree to this proposition, and Resolution 770 was issued under Chapter VII of the United Nations Charter demanding the facilitation of safe delivery of humanitarian aid, and was therefore legally binding.

== See also ==
- Breakup of Yugoslavia
- Bosnian War
- Croatian War of Independence
- List of United Nations Security Council Resolutions 701 to 800 (1991–1993)
- Slovenian Independence War
- Yugoslav Wars
