= United Nations Security Council Resolution 752 =

UN Security Council Resolution 752
- Bosnia and Herzegovina within Yugoslavia
- Date: 15 May 1992
- Meeting no.: 3,075
- Code: S/RES/752 (Document)
- Subject: Bosnia and Herzegovina
- Voting summary: 15 voted for; None voted against; None abstained
- Result: Adopted

Security Council composition
- Permanent members: China; France; Russia; United Kingdom; United States
- Non-permanent members: Austria; Belgium; Cape Verde; Ecuador; Hungary; India; Japan; Morocco; Venezuela; Zimbabwe

United Nations Security Council resolution 752, adopted unanimously on 15 May 1992, after reaffirming resolutions 713 (1991), 721 (1991), 724 (1991), 727 (1992), 740 (1992) 743 (1992) and 749 (1992), the Council expressed concern at the situation in the Yugoslavia, in particular the fighting in Bosnia and Herzegovina, demanding that all parties end the fighting and respect the ceasefire signed on 12 April 1992.

The Council called on all parties to co-operate with the efforts of the European Community to find a negotiated political settlement, noting that the change of borders by force is unacceptable. It also demanded that units of the Yugoslav People's Army and elements of the Croatian Army withdraw or be placed under the authority of the Government of Bosnia and Herzegovina. The Resolution demanded respect of sovereignty and territorial integrity of Bosnia and Herzegovina. The irregular forces present in the territory should have been disbanded and disarmed.

The resolution then emphasised the importance of humanitarian aid to the region taking into account the large number of displaced people, and called on the parties present in Bosnia and Herzegovina to allow for humanitarian access. It also asked for full co-operation with the United Nations Protection Force and European Community Monitoring Mission. Finally, Resolution 752 asked the Secretary-General Boutros Boutros-Ghali keep the situation under review.

The failure to implement the current resolution served as a basis for further international sanctions against Federal Republic of Yugoslavia (Serbia and Montenegro), beginning with Resolution 757.

== See also ==
- Bosnian War
- Croatian War of Independence
- List of United Nations Security Council Resolutions 701 to 800 (1991–1993)
- Yugoslav Wars
