= Battle of the Miljevci Plateau =

Part of the Croatian War of Independence

Coordinates: 43°52′50″N 16°2′10″E

- Part of the Croatian War of Independence
- Miljevci Plateau on the map of Croatia. RSK- or JNA-held areas in early 1992 are highlighted red.
Date	21–23 June 1992
Location	Dalmatia, Croatia
Result	Croatian victory

Belligerents
Croatia	Republic of Serbian Krajina

Commanders and leaders
(Croatia) Rahim Ademi	Milan Torbica

Units involved
Croatian Army: 113th Šibenik Brigade; 142nd Drniš Brigade; battle group of the 141st Split Brigade	Yugoslav People's Army: 9th Military Police Battalion (elements); Army of Serbian Krajina: 1st Territorial Defense Brigade; 1st Battalion

Strength
250	Unknown

Casualties and losses
7–8 killed	40 killed, 17 captured 10 tanks and APCs destroyed 6 howitzers captured

The Battle of the Miljevci Plateau was a clash between the Croatian Army (Hrvatska vojska - HV) and forces of the Republic of Serbian Krajina (RSK), fought on 21–23 June 1992, during the Croatian War of Independence. The battle represented the culmination of a series of skirmishes between the HV and the RSK forces in Northern Dalmatia, after the implementation of the Vance plan and deployment of the United Nations Protection Force (UNPROFOR) began. The skirmishes occurred in the pink zones—areas under control of the RSK, but outside the UN Protected Areas established by the Vance plan.

Elements of two HV brigades advanced several kilometres north of Šibenik and captured the Miljevci Plateau, encompassing 108 square kilometres (42 square miles) of territory and seven villages. After the battle, the UNPROFOR requested the HV to pull back to its positions prior to 21 June, and the request was followed by the United Nations Security Council Resolution 762 urging Croatia to withdraw from the plateau, but the HV remained in place. In the immediate aftermath, Croatian authorities claimed the offensive was not ordered by the General Staff and that the advance was made in response to a series of provocations. After the battle, some bodies of the killed RSK soldiers were thrown into a karst pit and were not retrieved until August, when the released prisoners of war informed the UNPROFOR of the location of the bodies.

== Background ==
In 1990, following the electoral defeat of the government of the Socialist Republic of Croatia, ethnic tensions worsened. The Yugoslav People's Army (Jugoslovenska Narodna Armija – JNA) confiscated Croatia's Territorial Defence Force's (Teritorijalna obrana – TO) weapons to minimize resistance. On 17 August, the tensions escalated into an open revolt by Croatian Serbs, centred on the predominantly Serb-populated areas of the Dalmatian hinterland around Knin, parts of the Lika, Kordun, Banovina regions and eastern Croatia.

Following the Pakrac clash between Serb insurgents and Croatian special police in March 1991, the conflict had escalated into the Croatian War of Independence. The JNA stepped in, increasingly supporting the Croatian Serb insurgents. In early April, the leaders of the Croatian Serb revolt declared their intention to integrate the area under their control, known as SAO Krajina, with Serbia. In May, the Croatian government responded by forming the Croatian National Guard (Zbor narodne garde – ZNG), but its development was hampered by a United Nations (UN) arms embargo introduced in September.

On 8 October, Croatia declared independence from Yugoslavia, and a month later the ZNG was renamed the Croatian Army (Hrvatska vojska – HV). Late 1991 saw the fiercest fighting of the war, as the 1991 Yugoslav campaign in Croatia culminated in the Siege of Dubrovnik, and the Battle of Vukovar. In November, Croatia, Serbia and the JNA agreed upon the Vance plan, contained in the Geneva Accord. The plan entailed a ceasefire, protection of civilians in specific areas designated as United Nations Protected Areas and UN peacekeepers in Croatia. The ceasefire came into effect on 3 January 1992. In December 1991, the European Community announced its decision to grant a diplomatic recognition to Croatia on 15 January 1992. SAO Krajina renamed itself the Republic of Serbian Krajina (RSK) on 19 December 1991.

Despite the Geneva Accord requiring an immediate withdrawal of JNA personnel and equipment from Croatia, the JNA stayed behind for up to eight months in some areas. When its troops eventually pulled out, JNA left their equipment to the RSK. As a consequence of organisational problems and breaches of ceasefire, the UN peacekeepers, named the United Nations Protection Force (UNPROFOR), did not start to deploy until 8 March. The UNPROFOR took two months to fully assemble in the UN Protected Areas (UNPAs). Furthermore, the RSK forces remained in areas outside designated UNPAs which were under RSK control at the time of the signing of the Implementation Agreement ceasefire of 3 January 1992. Those areas, later better known as the pink zones, were supposed to be restored to Croatian control from the outset of the plan implementation. Failure of this aspect of the implementation of the Vance plan made the pink zones a major source of contention for Croatia and the RSK.

== Prelude ==
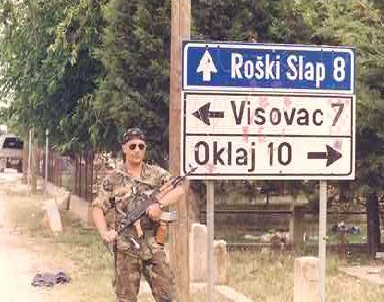
A Croatian infantryman posing in the village of Širitovci, on the Miljevci Plateau

Before the UNPROFOR fully deployed, the HV clashed with an armed force of the RSK in the village of Nos Kalik, located in a pink zone near Šibenik, and captured the village at 4:45 p.m. on 2 March 1992. The JNA formed a battlegroup to counterattack the next day. The JNA battlegroup, augmented by elements of the 9th Military Police Battalion, deployed at 5:50 a.m. and clashed with the HV force in Nos Kalik. However, the JNA counterattack failed. The HV captured 21 RSK troops in Nos Kalik, intent on exchanging the prisoners for Croats held under arrest in Knin. Following negotiations, the HV agreed to pull back on 11 April, but later declined to do so, claiming deteriorating security at the battlefield in general prevented the withdrawal. Several Serb-owned houses in Nos Kalik were torched after the HV captured the village.

The HV clashed with units subordinated to the 180th Motorised Brigade of the JNA in a pink zone near Zadar on 17–22 May. While the JNA repelled attacks in most areas around Zadar and Stankovci, the HV managed to cut a JNA base at the Križ Hill away from the rest of the force on 17 May. The JNA outpost occupied high ground overlooking the surrounding area, including Zadar. It housed radar equipment and was used as an artillery observer post. The JNA attempted to relieve the besieged garrison in the next few days, however the attempts failed and the base surrendered to the HV on 22 May. The attack and capture of the Križ Hill, codenamed Operation Jaguar, was carried out by the 2nd Battalion of the 159th Infantry Brigade of the HV, supported by artillery of the 112th Infantry Brigade.

== Timeline ==
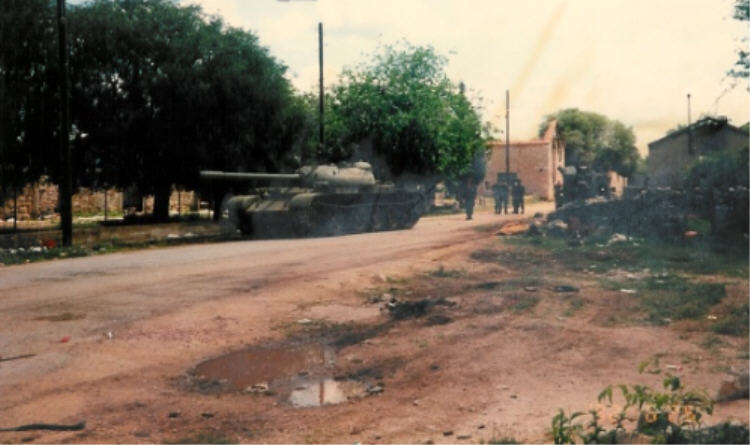
RSK T-55 tank destroyed in the village of Širitovci on the Miljevci Plateau

On 21 June, the HV attacked RSK positions at the Miljevci Plateau, located in the pink zone north of Šibenik. The TO forces (1st battalion of 1st Brigade) in the area were subordinated to the 1st Brigade of the TO, and Lieutenant Colonel General Milan Torbica. The HV deployed 250 troops, elements of the 113th, 142nd and 141st Infantry Brigades commanded by Brigadier Kruno Mazalin. The HV had infiltrated the pink zone along three routes—via Nos Kalik, across the Čikola river and by boat sailing upstream along the Krka River, during the night of 20/21 June. The fighting began at 5 a.m. as the HV force, deployed in 26 squads, captured six out of seven villages on the plateau by the end of the morning. At 8:00 p.m., the HV captured the village of Ključ, and all of the plateau. The advance created a HV-held salient south of Knin, several kilometres deep. It also led the RSK artillery to bombard Šibenik and HV bombardment of Knin in response, both on 22 June.

The artillery fire progressively intensified until 23 June, while the RSK mobilised and counterattacked against the HV positions at the Miljevci Plateau. However, the mobilisation yielded only 227 additional troops, and the counterattack failed. An UNPROFOR assessment concluded the situation might deteriorate further and engulf all of the pink zones. To address the situation, UNPROFOR military commander Lieutenant General Satish Nambiar met with Deputy Prime Minister of Croatia Milan Ramljak and Chief of the General Staff of the Armed Forces of the Republic of Croatia General Anton Tus in Zagreb the same day, in order to discuss the developments on the Miljevci Plateau. Skirmishes continued on 24 June, accompanied by some artillery fire. Morale of the RSK troops plummeted though, causing a TO garrison based in nearby Trbounje to abandon its barracks.

== Aftermath ==
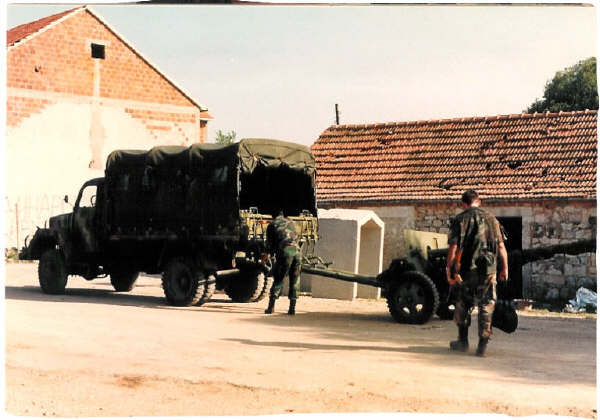
An RSK artillery piece captured on the Miljevci Plateau

According to Croatian sources, the HV lost seven or eight troops killed in the battle. Serb sources cite 40 killed RSK troops, in the battle or its immediate aftermath, while the HV took seventeen prisoners. The prisoners were taken to the Kuline barracks in Šibenik. On 23 June, a total of 29 RSK soldiers killed at the Miljevci Plateau on the first day of the battle were thrown into the Bačića Pit, contrary to orders given by Brigadier Ivan Bačić, commanding officer of the 113th Infantry Brigade. Bačić ordered burial of the killed RSK troops at a local Serbian Orthodox cemetery. The bodies of the dead soldiers were later exhumed from a karst pit through the mediation of UN peacekeepers. The same day, one prisoner, Miroslav Subotić, was shot in Nos Kalik by HV personnel. He was one of a group of prisoners tasked with clearance of the area after the fighting. According to Croatian sources, the HV also destroyed ten tanks and armoured personnel carriers, and captured six howitzers and a considerable stockpile of other weapons and ammunition in the battle. The offensive brought seven villages and 108 square kilometres (42 square miles) to HV control.

During their meeting with Nambiar, Ramljak and Tus claimed that the offensive was neither planned nor ordered by authorities in Zagreb. They stated that the advance was made in response to a series of provocations made by the RSK armed forces. Bačić claimed that while no specific order to attack was received, Tus did instruct him to respond aggressively and capture as much territory as possible in cases of grave breaches of ceasefire by the RSK forces. Nevertheless, Bačić was reprimanded by the President of Croatia Franjo Tuđman because of the offensive. In the RSK, Torbica was forced to resign his post and was replaced by Major General Mile Novaković.

UNPROFOR and the European Community Monitor Mission (ECMM) requested the HV to withdraw to positions held before the offensive, but the HV declined the request. However, Croatia agreed that UNPROFOR and ECMM monitors would continue to be present in the pink zones when Croatia assumed control over them. The move was planned as a way to reassure the Serb population that the pink zones could provide them safety. In the aftermath of the offensive, the United Nations Security Council (UNSC) adopted the UNSC Resolution 762, urging cessation of hostilities in or near the UNPAs, and urging the HV to pull back to positions held before 21 June. The 113th Brigade of the HV remained at the plateau regardless. The resolution authorised the UNPROFOR to perform monitoring of the pink zones. It also recommended establishment of a joint commission chaired by an UNPROFOR representative, and including representatives of the Government of Croatia, local authorities and the ECMM to oversee restoration of Croatian control in the pink zones.

The prisoners taken by the HV were released in August, and they informed the UNPROFOR about the bodies in the Bačića Pit and the death of Subotić. The bodies were retrieved by Croatian authorities in the presence of UNPROFOR and other international organisations. Two Croatian military police members were charged with Subotić's murder in 2011. As of 2013 the trial is ongoing.

In 2012, twenty years after the battle, President Ivo Josipović presented the Charter of the Republic of Croatia to the commanders and units involved in the battle, commending their military achievements. That was the first such move in twenty years, and a reversal of the official stance towards the offensive which had originally declared it as an unauthorised deployment of the HV.
