= United Nations Security Council Resolution 757 =

UN Security Council Resolution 757
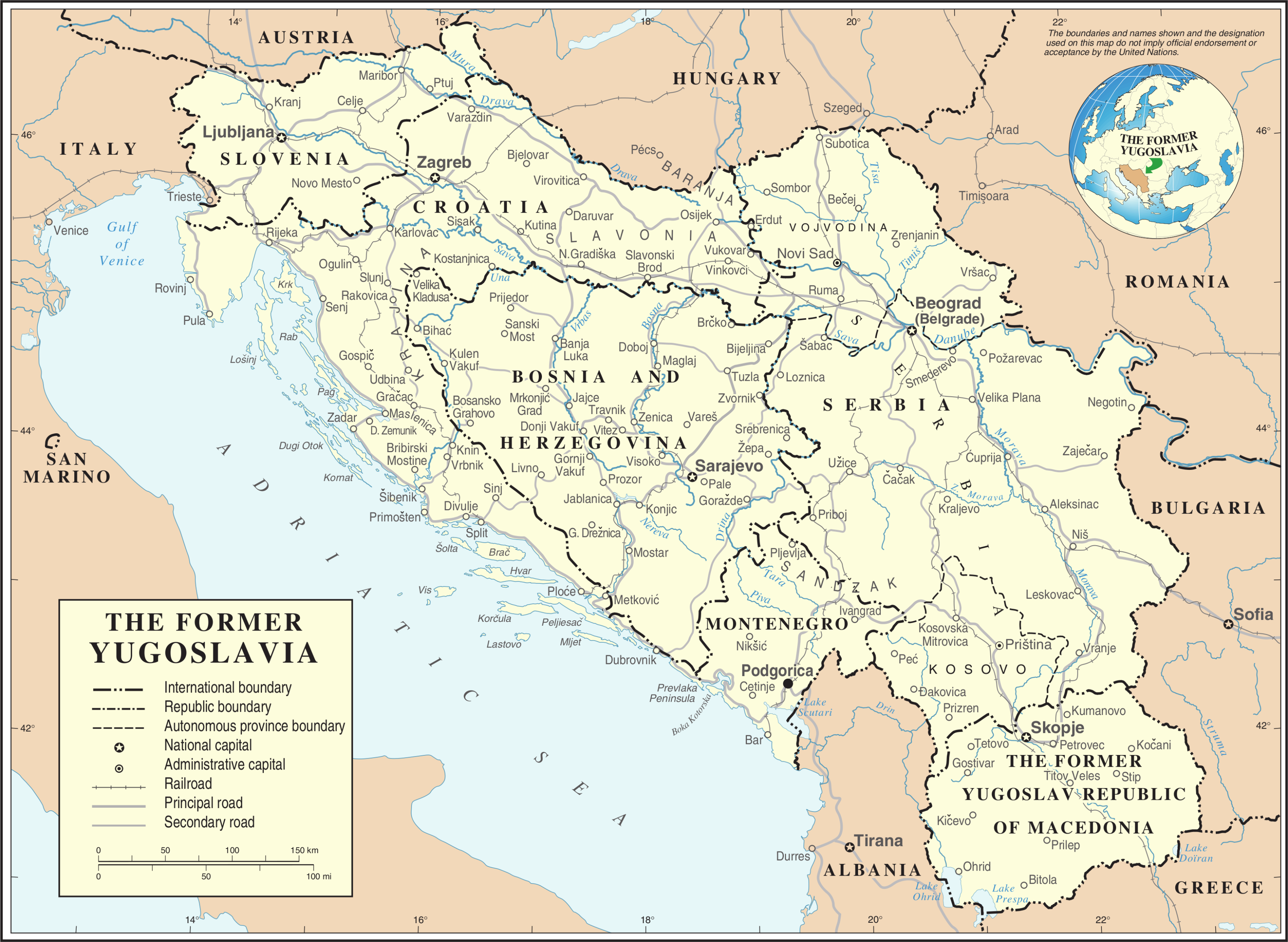
- Map of former Yugoslavia
- Date: 30 May 1992
- Meeting no.: 3,082
- Code: S/RES/757 (Document)
- Subject: Yugoslavia
- Voting summary: 13 voted for; None voted against; 2 abstained
- Result: Adopted

Security Council composition
- Permanent members: China; France; Russia; United Kingdom; United States
- Non-permanent members: Austria; Belgium; Cape Verde; Ecuador; Hungary; India; Japan; Morocco; Venezuela; Zimbabwe

United Nations Security Council resolution 757 was adopted on 30 May 1992. After reaffirming resolutions 713 (1991), 721 (1991), 724 (1991), 727 (1992), 740 (1992) 743 (1992), 749 (1992) and 752 (1992), the Council condemned the failure of the authorities in the Federal Republic of Yugoslavia (Serbia and Montenegro) to implement Resolution 752.

After demanding the Croatian Army respect the article 4 of the Resolution 752, the Council stated that all states should abide by the following rules, until Resolution 752 had been implemented. It demanded that all Member States should:

- (a) prevent the import of all products and commodities from Yugoslavia or any activities by their nationals to promote such exports;
- (b) prevent the sale of all products and commodities to Yugoslavia, except for humanitarian need;
- (c) not make available any commercial, industrial, or public utility, funds, or financial resources to Yugoslavia;
- (d) deny permission to aircraft to take off from, land or overfly their territory if it is destined to land or has arrived from Yugoslavia, except on humanitarian grounds;
- (e) prohibit the maintenance servicing or engineering of aircraft in or operated by Yugoslavia;
- (f) reduce the level of diplomatic and consular staff in Yugoslavia;
- (g) prevent the participation of persons and teams representing Yugoslavia in sporting events hosted on their territory;
- (h) suspend scientific, technical and cultural exchanges and visits.

The Council further decided that the sanctions should not apply to the United Nations Protection Force, the Conference on Yugoslavia, or the European Community Monitoring Mission. It also called for a security zone to be established in Sarajevo and its airport, further calling on the security council committee established in Resolution 724 to monitor the arms embargo, and that the council as a whole would keep the situation under review.

Resolution 757 was adopted by 13 votes to none against, with two abstentions, from China and Zimbabwe.

== Sports sanctions ==
The Yugoslavia football team won qualifying Group 4 for the Euro 1992 finals in June but was disqualified under the UN sanctions; group runners-up Denmark replaced Yugoslavia at the finals and won the entire tournament. They were also banned from both the 1994 FIFA World Cup and UEFA Euro 1996.

The resolution came just before the start of the 1992 Summer Olympics, and the International Olympic Committee reached a compromise with the UN whereby the Yugoslav Olympic Committee was not invited to the games but Yugoslav athletes were permitted to compete under the label Independent Olympic Participants, and likewise at the 1992 Summer Paralympics as Independent Paralympic Participants.

== See also ==
- Breakup of Yugoslavia
- Bosnian War
- Croatian War of Independence
- List of United Nations Security Council Resolutions 701 to 800 (1991–1993)
- Slovenian Independence War
- Yugoslav Wars
- Sanctions against Yugoslavia
- Sarajevo bread line massacre
