= Vance plan =

1991 peace plan during the Croatian War of Independence

JNA/RSK held areas in Croatia in January 1992

The Vance plan (Croatian: Vanceov plan, Serbian: Vensov plan) was a peace plan negotiated by the former United States Secretary of State Cyrus Vance in November 1991 during the Croatian War of Independence. At that time, Vance was the Special Envoy of the Secretary-General of the United Nations; he was assisted by United States diplomat Herbert Okun during the negotiations. The plan was designed to implement a ceasefire, demilitarize parts of Croatia that were under the control of Croatian Serbs and the Yugoslav People's Army (JNA), allow the return of refugees, and create favourable conditions for negotiations on a permanent political settlement of the conflict resulting from the breakup of Yugoslavia.

The Vance plan consisted of two agreements. The first agreement, known as the Geneva Accord, was signed by Yugoslav defence minister General Veljko Kadijević, President of Serbia Slobodan Milošević and Croatian President Franjo Tuđman in Geneva, Switzerland, on 23 November 1991. Because the ceasefire agreed at that time did not hold, further negotiations resulted in the Implementation Agreement of 2 January 1992. The Implementation Agreement, signed in Sarajevo, Bosnia and Herzegovina, by JNA Lieutenant Colonel General Andrija Rašeta and Croatian defence minister Gojko Šušak, produced a longer-lasting ceasefire, which was supervised by the United Nations Protection Force (UNPROFOR). The parties failed to completely implement the remaining major aspects of the Vance plan.

== Background ==
In August 1990, an insurgency known as the Log Revolution took place in Croatia. It centred on the predominantly Serb-populated areas of the Dalmatian hinterland around the city of Knin, parts of the Lika, Kordun, and Banovina regions, and settlements in eastern Croatia with significant Serb populations. These areas were subsequently declared to be the Republic of Serbian Krajina (RSK). After the RSK declared its intention to join Serbia, the Government of Croatia declared the RSK a rebel organization. By March 1991, the conflict had escalated, resulting in the Croatian War of Independence. In June 1991, Croatia declared its independence as Yugoslavia disintegrated. A three-month moratorium on the declarations of independence by Croatia and the RSK followed, but both declarations came into effect on 8 October.

The Croatian National Guard (Croatian: Zbor narodne garde, ZNG) was formed in May 1991 because the Yugoslav People's Army (Serbo-Croatian: Jugoslovenska Narodna Armija, JNA) increasingly supported the RSK and the Croatian Police were unable to cope with the situation. In November the same year, the ZNG was renamed the Croatian Army (Croatian: Hrvatska vojska, HV). The establishment of the military of Croatia was hampered by a UN arms embargo that had been introduced in September. The final months of 1991 saw the fiercest fighting of the war, culminating in the Battle of the Barracks, the Siege of Dubrovnik, and the Battle of Vukovar.

== Geneva Accord ==
Geneva Accord
- Created: 23 November 1991
- Location: Geneva, Switzerland
- Signatories: Veljko Kadijević; Slobodan Milošević; Franjo Tuđman
- Purpose: Ceasefire in the Croatian War of Independence

The Vance plan was a result of a diplomatic mission by Cyrus Vance, the former United States Secretary of State, then Special Envoy of the Secretary-General of the United Nations. He was assisted by US diplomat Herbert Okun and Under-Secretary-General of the United Nations for Special Political Affairs Marrack Goulding. The mission was sent to SFR Yugoslavia and was aimed at negotiating the end of hostilities in Croatia in late 1991. The plan proposed a ceasefire, protection of civilians in specific areas designated as United Nations Protected Areas and a United Nations (UN) peacekeeping operation in Croatia.

The plan was first presented to the President of Serbia, Slobodan Milošević. Milošević found the plan wholly acceptable and promised he would ensure the leadership of the RSK eventually supported it. He endorsed the plan because it ensured the preservation of Serbian territorial gains of 1991, retained Croatian Serb administration of the areas where the peacekeepers would be deployed and allowed the JNA to shift its focus to Bosnia and Herzegovina. Vance then met Yugoslav defence minister JNA General Veljko Kadijević, who also endorsed the plan and was apparently urged by Milošević to do so. After the plan was accepted by Croatian President Franjo Tuđman, the Geneva Accord was signed by Tuđman, Milošević and Kadijević in Geneva, Switzerland, on 23 November 1991. The Accord was a precondition for the deployment of the UN peacekeeping force. It comprised four provisions; the end of the Croatian blockade of JNA barracks, the withdrawal of JNA personnel and equipment from Croatia, the implementation of a ceasefire and the facilitation of the delivery of humanitarian aid.

The parties to the accord also agreed to the deployment of a UN peacekeeping mission in Croatia, which was later authorized through United Nations Security Council Resolution 721 of 27 November, following a formal request for deployment of the peacekeepers submitted by the Yugoslav government the previous day.

The Vance plan was approved pursuant to UN Security Council Resolution 721 as a part of the Report of the UN Secretary-General submitted on 11 December, as UN Security Council Resolution 724 of 15 December. That resolution determined that the conditions necessary to deploy the peacekeepers had not yet been met. Instead, the UN deployed 50 liaison officers to prepare the mission while fighting continued throughout 1991. The blockade of JNA barracks in HV-controlled territory remained in place until December 1991.

In the final ten-day round of meetings, Vance negotiated another ceasefire agreement as a provisional arrangement backed by a deployment of UN peacekeepers to oversee it. The final obstacle to the agreement was removed when Tuđman agreed to lift the blockade of the remaining JNA barracks in HV-held territory on 25 December. This met Kadijević's conditions for the implementation of the ceasefire, and Milošević declared he had no objections to the plan on 31 December.

== Implementation Agreement ==
Implementation Agreement
- Created: 2 January 1992
- Location: Sarajevo, Bosnia and Herzegovina
- Signatories: Andrija Rašeta; Gojko Šušak
- Purpose: Cease-fire in the Croatian War of Independence to allow implementation of the Geneva Accord and the Vance plan

The final agreement is known as the Vance plan, the Implementation Agreement, or the Sarajevo Agreement (Croatian: Sarajevski sporazum). The UN deployment was made possible by the acceptance that the agreement did not represent a final political settlement and by the description of the role of the UN mission, which allowed both sides to claim it as a victory. The RSK claimed the situation allowed for the maintenance of RSK authorities until a final political settlement was reached, virtually ensuring the RSK had no incentive to negotiate. Croatians believed the UN would restore the RSK-controlled area to Croatian authority, which the UN would not attempt.

After four hours of negotiations, the agreement was signed by Croatian Defence Minister Gojko Šušak and deputy commander of the JNA's 5th Military District Lieutenant Colonel General Andrija Rašeta in Sarajevo, Bosnia and Herzegovina, on 2 January 1992. It was the 15th ceasefire agreement signed since the start of the Croatian War of Independence on 31 March 1991. The ceasefire generally held after it took effect on 3 January at 18:00 hours. The main exception was in the Dubrovnik area, where the JNA held positions around the city of Dubrovnik and in nearby Konavle until July 1992. That area was not included in the UN peacekeeping deployment schedule. On 4 January, the Yugoslav Navy retreated from the Lora naval base near Split. On 5 January, Major General Imra Agotić, commander of the ZNG, noted 84 ceasefire violations by the Serb side. On 7 January, the Yugoslav Air Force shot down a European Community Monitor Mission helicopter. The next day, Kadijević resigned as Minister of Defence and was replaced with Colonel General Blagoje Adžić.

The Vance plan was designed to stop fighting in Croatia and allow negotiations to proceed without the impact of ongoing hostilities. It offered no political solutions in advance. The plan entailed the deployment of the 10,000-strong United Nations Protection Force (UNPROFOR) to the three major conflict areas designated as UN Protected Areas (UNPAs). The plan listed specific municipalities that were to be included in each UNPA, but the exact borders of each UNPA were not defined clearly because several municipalities were only to be partially included. The task of defining the exact borders of each UNPA was delegated to the UN liaison officers deployed in advance, in co-operation with authorities in each area. Creation of the UNPAs was necessary for acceptance of the plan by Milošević and Tuđman. The Serb-dominated authorities of Yugoslavia originally requested the deployment of a UN force along a zone between Serb and Croatian areas, reflecting the Serb desire to see the peacekeeping force securing the confrontation lines. Croatia wanted the UN force deployed along its international borders. The UNPAs served to formally satisfy both parties.

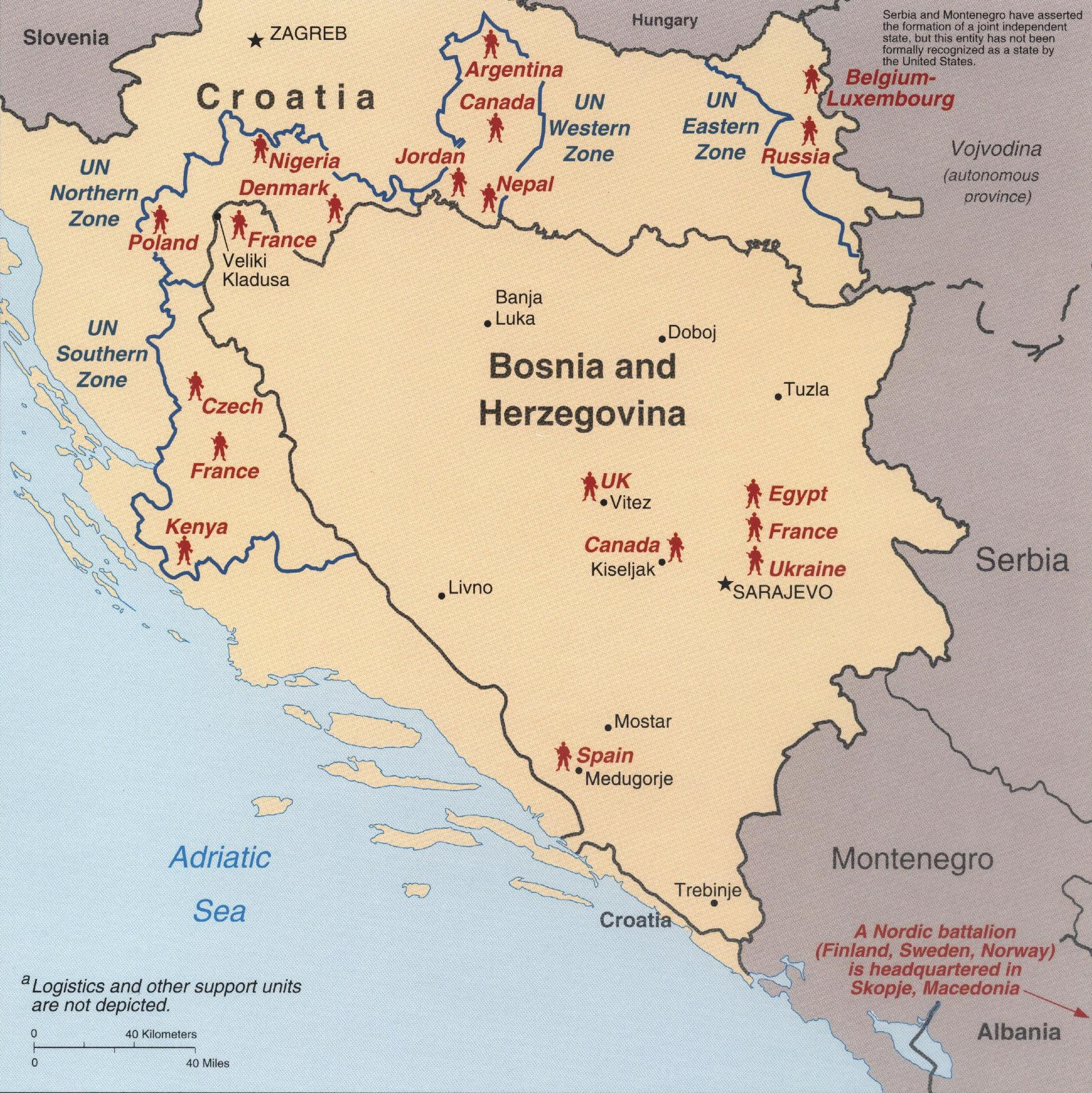
UN peacekeeper deployments based on the Vance plan

UNPAs defined by the Vance plan
UNPA	Municipality	Notes
Eastern Slavonia	Beli Manastir	entire municipality
Eastern Slavonia	Vukovar	entire municipality
Eastern Slavonia	Osijek	areas east of the city of Osijek
Eastern Slavonia	Vinkovci	unspecified villages in the extreme east
Western Slavonia	Grubišno Polje	entire municipality
Western Slavonia	Daruvar	entire municipality
Western Slavonia	Pakrac	entire municipality
Western Slavonia	Nova Gradiška	western parts of the municipality
Western Slavonia	Novska	eastern parts of the municipality
Krajina	Benkovac	entire municipality
Krajina	Dvor	entire municipality
Krajina	Donji Lapac	entire municipality
Krajina	Glina	entire municipality
Krajina	Gračac	entire municipality
Krajina	Knin	entire municipality
Krajina	Kostajnica	entire municipality
Krajina	Obrovac	entire municipality
Krajina	Petrinja	entire municipality
Krajina	Slunj	entire municipality
Krajina	Titova Korenica	entire municipality
Krajina	Vojnić	entire municipality
Krajina	Vrginmost	entire municipality

UNPROFOR was tasked with creating buffer zones between the belligerents, disarming the Croatian Serb Territorial Defence Force troops, overseeing the JNA and HV withdrawal from the UNPAs, and the return of refugees to those areas. United Nations Security Council Resolution 743 of 21 February 1992 described the legal basis of the UN mission, requested and agreed upon in November 1991, with no explicit reference to Chapter VI or Chapter VII of the United Nations Charter. Instead, the resolution referred to Chapter VIII of the United Nations Charter, which foresees enforcement through regional arrangements or agencies after further authorization by the UN Security Council.

President of the RSK Milan Babić refused to endorse the plan; Milošević summoned him to Belgrade where he, Serb members of the federal presidency, JNA commanders and Bosnian Serb leaders tried to persuade Babić to change his mind in a 70-hour-long meeting. Despite failing to persuade Babić, Milošević arranged to have the RSK parliament approve the plan instead. Babić's and Milošević's supporters organized two separate, concurrent sessions of the RSK parliament—each group proclaiming victory. On 27 February, Babić was removed as RSK president following an intervention by Milošević; he was replaced with Goran Hadžić. Babić opposed the Vance plan because he considered that acceptance of it, and the replacement of the JNA by UNPROFOR, would represent a de facto acceptance of Croatian sovereignty over the territory held by the RSK because the Vance plan treated Republic of Serbian Krajina territory as part of Croatia. Croatia considered the UNPAs part of Croatia and objected to any official recognition of RSK officials within them. It feared the RSK would use the UN mission to consolidate itself within the UNPAs. The Croatian authorities considered that the only parties to the Vance Plan were the authorities in Belgrade, the UN and Croatia.

== Aftermath ==
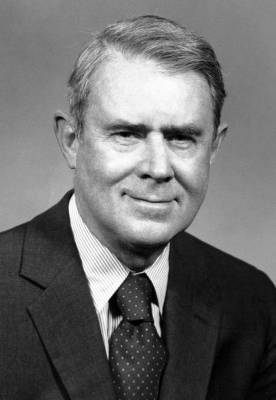
Cyrus Vance, author of the Vance plan

Despite the Geneva Accord requiring the immediate withdrawal of JNA personnel and equipment from Croatia, the JNA remained there for another seven to eight months. When they eventually withdrew, they left their equipment to RSK forces. The 2 January ceasefire allowed the JNA to retain its positions in East and West Slavonia, which were on the brink of military collapse. As a consequence of organizational problems and breaches of the previous ceasefire agreement, the UNPROFOR did not start to arrive until 8 March and took two months to fully deploy in the UNPAs. Even though UNPROFOR had placed most of the RSK's heavy weapons in storage areas jointly controlled by the UN and the RSK by January 1993, the peacekeeping troops were unable to fulfil the provisions of the Vance plan, such as the disarmament of the RSK militia, the return of refugees, the restoration of civilian authority and establishment of an ethnically mixed police force. The RSK military was retitled as police while the ethnic cleansing of areas under its control continued unchecked. UNPROFOR was compelled to prevent the return of refugees because of poor security conditions. No attempt was made to establish an ethnically mixed police force. UNPROFOR also failed to remove RSK forces from areas outside designated UNPAs that were under RSK control when the Implementation Agreement ceasefire was signed. Those areas—later better known as the "pink zones"— were supposed to be restored to Croatian control from the outset. Failure of this aspect of the implementation of the Vance plan made the pink zones a major source of friction between Croatia and the RSK.

In 1993, Croatia launched several small-scale military operations against the RSK to seize significant local objectives and capture international attention; it was worried the situation on the ground might become permanent. In response, the RSK military retrieved their weapons from the UN/RSK-controlled storage sites, reversing the only major success of UNPROFOR. In March 1995, the UNPROFOR mission was terminated following the efforts of U.S. Ambassador Richard Holbrooke; the United Nations Confidence Restoration Operation was deployed to Croatia with a new mandate. Later that year, most of the territory controlled by the RSK was captured by the HV during Operations Flash and Storm, which was foreseen by Babić when he opposed the Vance plan in 1991. The rest of the RSK-held areas were regained by Croatia following the Erdut Agreement negotiated between Croatian and Serbian authorities on 12 November 1995 during peace talks that also produced the Dayton Agreement.
