= United Nations Security Council Resolution 776 =

UN Security Council Resolution 776
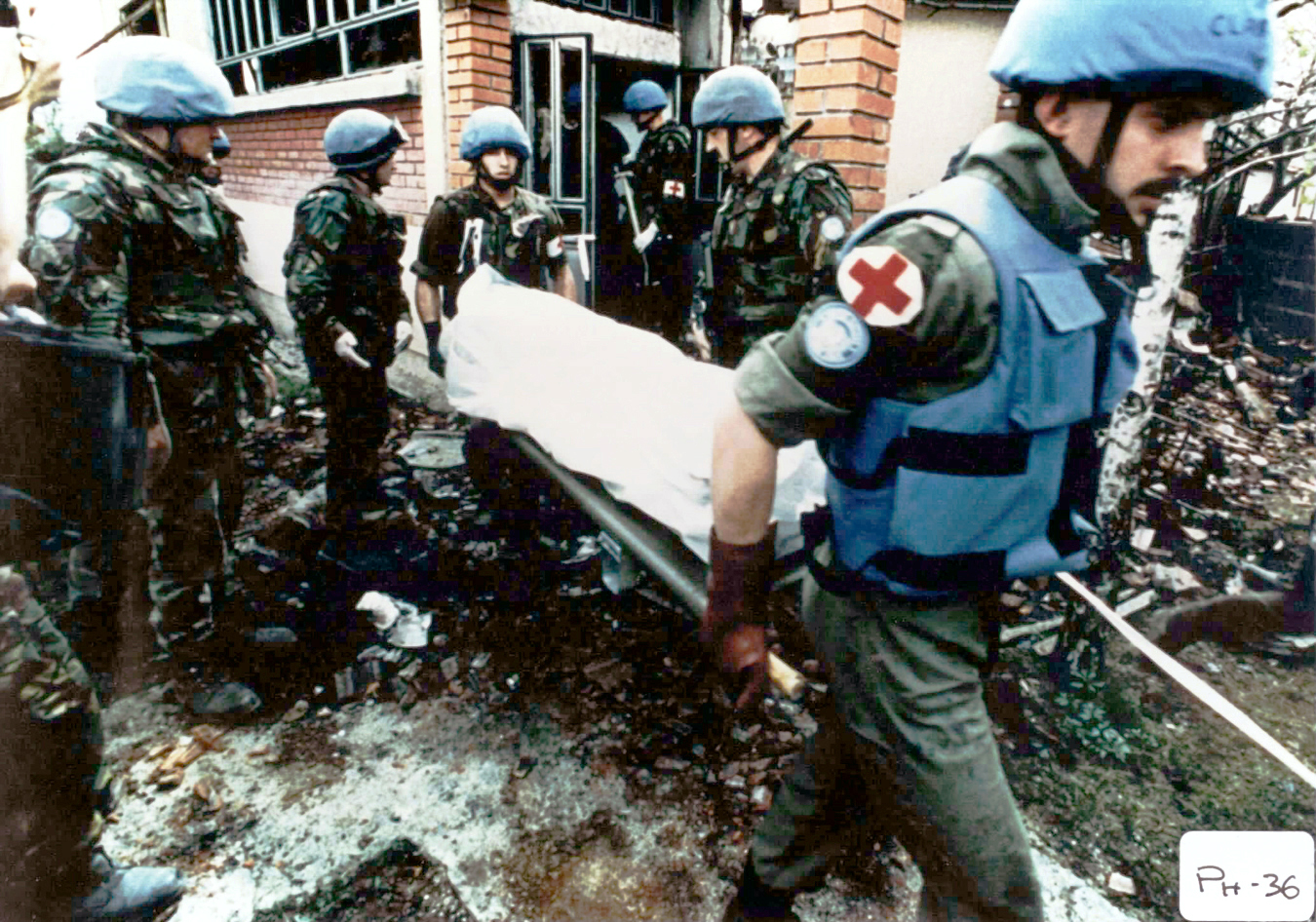
- United Nations peace-keepers collecting bodies in Bosnia and Herzegovina
- Date: 14 September 1992
- Meeting no.: 3,114
- Code: S/RES/776 (Document)
- Subject: Bosnia and Herzegovina
- Voting summary: 12 voted for; None voted against; 3 abstained
- Result: Adopted

Security Council composition
- Permanent members: China; France; Russia; United Kingdom; United States
- Non-permanent members: Austria; Belgium; Cape Verde; Ecuador; Hungary; India; Japan; Morocco; Venezuela; Zimbabwe

United Nations Security Council resolution 776, adopted on 14 September 1992, after reaffirming Resolution 743 (1992) and noting offers of assistance made by Member States since the adoption of Resolution 770 (1992), the Council authorised an increase in the size and strength of the United Nations Protection Force in Bosnia and Herzegovina and other areas of the former Yugoslavia.

Under Resolution 776, the Protection Force was to provide protection to humanitarian organisations such as the International Committee of the Red Cross, and other activities as requested by the United Nations High Commissioner for Refugees such as scheduling convoys and negotiating safe passage. The Force would also be permitted to use self-defence if armed persons attempted to prevent it from carrying out its mandate.

The resolution was adopted by 12 votes to none, with 3 abstentions from China, India and Zimbabwe.

== See also ==
- Breakup of Yugoslavia
- Bosnian War
- Croatian War of Independence
- List of United Nations Security Council Resolutions 701 to 800 (1991–1993)
- Slovenian Independence War
- Yugoslav Wars
