= United Nations Security Council Resolution 770 =

UN Security Council Resolution 770
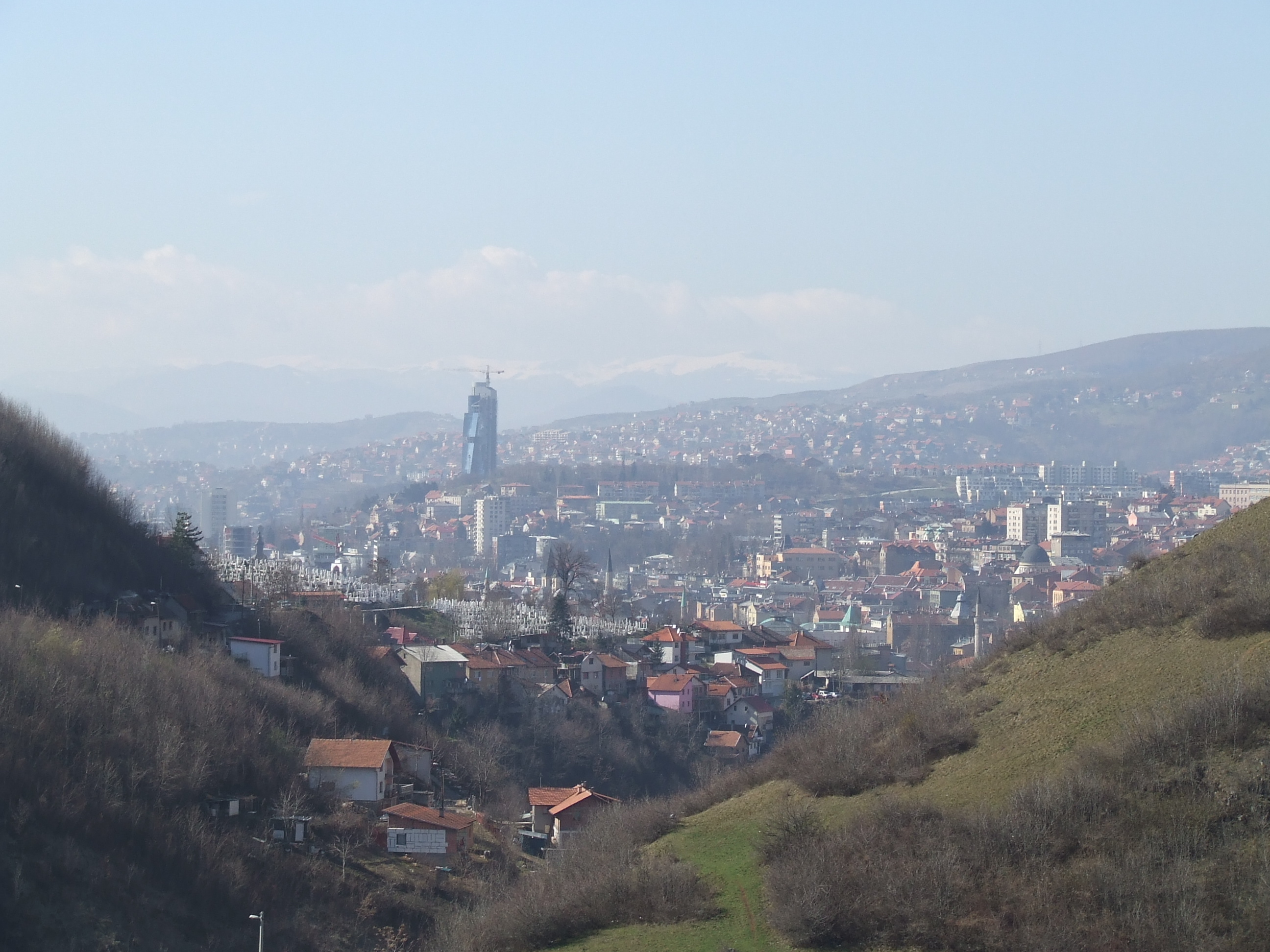
- Sarajevo
- Date: 13 August 1992
- Meeting no.: 3,106
- Code: S/RES/770 (Document)
- Subject: Bosnia and Herzegovina
- Voting summary: 12 voted for; None voted against; 3 abstained
- Result: Adopted

Security Council composition
- Permanent members: China; France; Russia; United Kingdom; United States
- Non-permanent members: Austria; Belgium; Cape Verde; Ecuador; Hungary; India; Japan; Morocco; Venezuela; Zimbabwe

United Nations Security Council resolution 770, adopted on 13 August 1992, after reaffirming previous resolutions on the topic, including Resolution 743 (1992), Resolution 749 (1992), Resolution 761 (1992) and Resolution 764 (1992), the Council recognised the humanitarian situation in Sarajevo and other areas in Bosnia and Herzegovina.

After determining the situation constituted a threat to international peace and security, the resolution was to be passed under Chapter VII of the United Nations Charter, the first resolution invoking Chapter VII on the case of the former Yugoslavia. The Council demanded that all parties and others concerned in Bosnia and Herzegovina stop the fighting immediately, urging unimpeded and continuous access to all camps, prisons and detention centres for the International Committee of the Red Cross. It also called upon Member States, nationally or through international agencies, to facilitate the delivery of humanitarian aid to Sarajevo and others areas in Bosnia and Herzegovina, further requiring them to report to the Secretary-General Boutros Boutros-Ghali on the measures they have taken.

The resolution requested the Secretary-General to keep the situation under review to consider possible new measures to ensure the unimpeded delivery of humanitarian supplies, demanding all parties to guarantee the safety of United Nations and other humanitarian workers in the country.

Resolution 770 was adopted by twelve votes to none, with three abstentions from China, India and Zimbabwe.

== See also ==
- Breakup of Yugoslavia
- Bosnian War
- Croatian War of Independence
- List of United Nations Security Council Resolutions 701 to 800 (1991–1993)
- Slovenian Independence War
- Yugoslav Wars
