= United Nations Security Council Resolution 764 =

UN Security Council Resolution 764
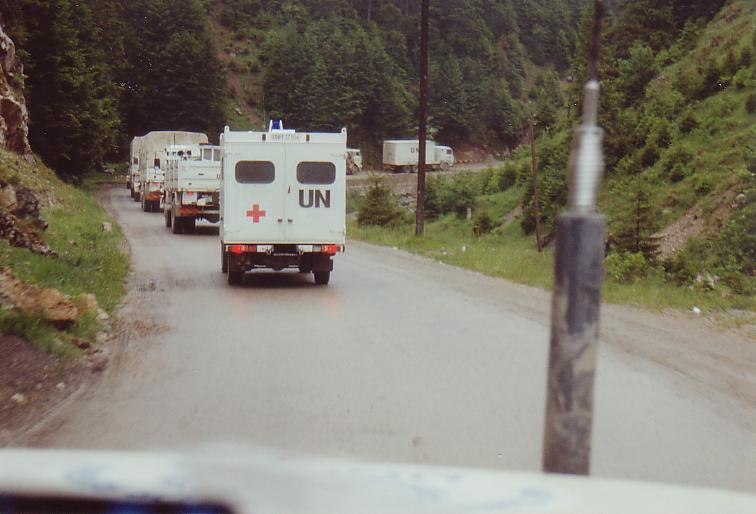
- UN humanitarian convoy (1994)
- Date: 13 July 1992
- Meeting no.: 3,093
- Code: S/RES/764 (Document)
- Subject: Bosnia and Herzegovina
- Voting summary: 15 voted for; None voted against; None abstained
- Result: Adopted

Security Council composition
- Permanent members: China; France; Russia; United Kingdom; United States
- Non-permanent members: Austria; Belgium; Cape Verde; Ecuador; Hungary; India; Japan; Morocco; Venezuela; Zimbabwe

United Nations Security Council resolution 764, adopted unanimously on 13 July 1992, after reaffirming previous resolutions on the topic, the Council noted the violations of the agreement concerning Sarajevo International Airport which established a security corridor and demanded withdrawal of anti-aircraft weapon systems, and decided to authorise an additional deployment of United Nations Protection Force personnel. It would increase the size of the Force to two infantry battalions.

The Council approved the report of the Secretary-General Boutros Boutros-Ghali regarding the implementation of resolutions 757 (1992), 758 (1992) and 761 (1992). The additional personnel would facilitate the delivery of humanitarian aid and the security and functioning of Sarajevo airport.

As with previous resolutions, Resolution 764 called on all parties to adhere to the ceasefire agreement of 5 June 1992, in order to end hostile activity in Bosnia and Herzegovina, further commending the Force and demanding co-operation with it and international organisations present in the country from all parties. It also urged all parties concerned to engage in negotiations to find a political solution, co-operating with the efforts of the European Community and the support of the Organization for Security and Co-operation in Europe.

The International Criminal Tribunal for the former Yugoslavia was based on Resolution 764, which stated that persons who committed violations of international humanitarian law and the Geneva Conventions would be held responsible.

== See also ==
- Breakup of Yugoslavia
- Bosnian War
- Croatian War of Independence
- List of United Nations Security Council Resolutions 701 to 800 (1991–1993)
- Slovenian Independence War
- Yugoslav Wars
