= United Nations Security Council Resolution 769 =

UN Security Council Resolution 769
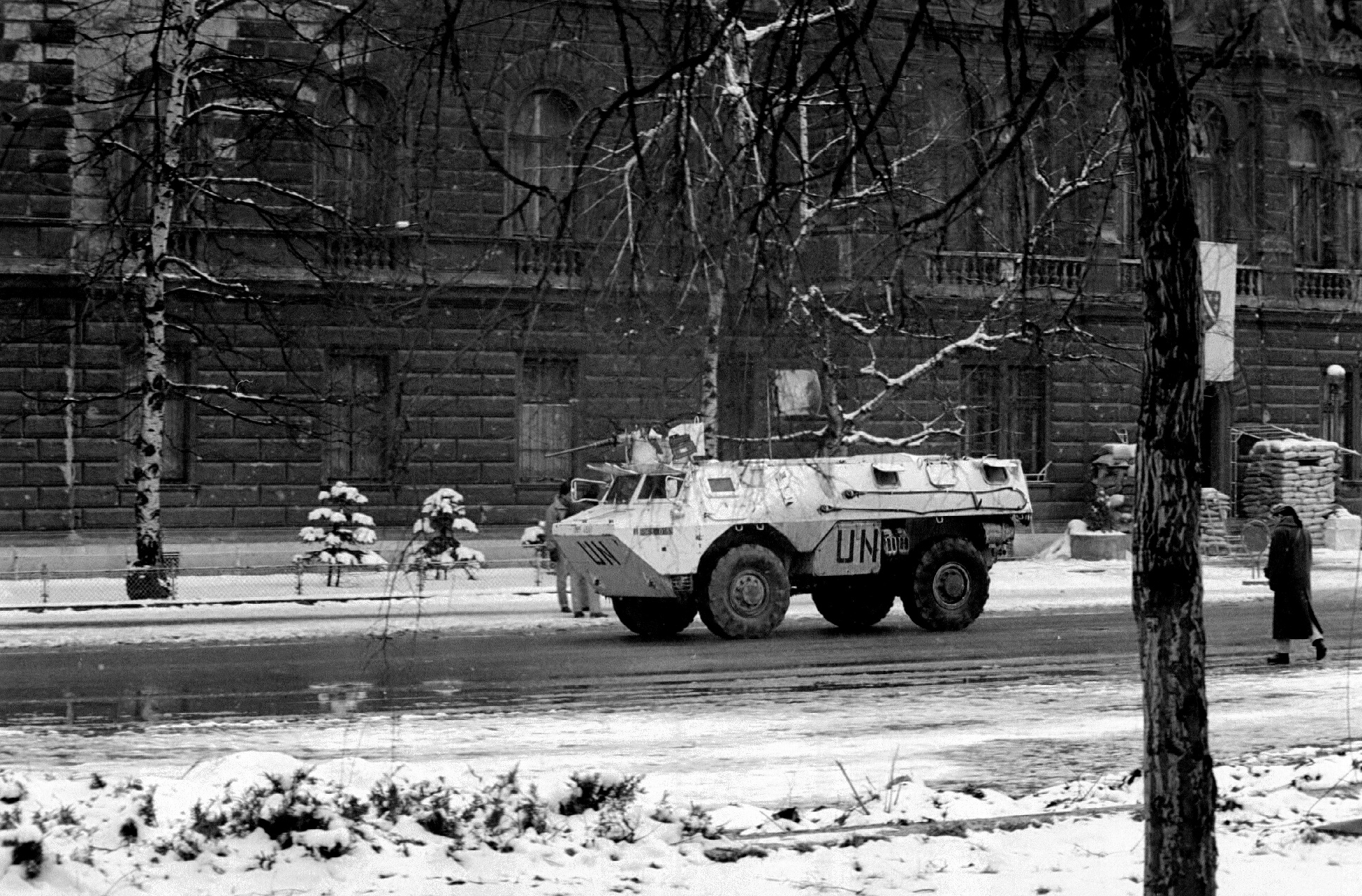
- UNPROFOR armoured personnel carrier passes the Presidency Building in Sarajevo
- Date: 7 August 1992
- Meeting no.: 3,104
- Code: S/RES/769 (Document)
- Subject: UNPROFOR
- Voting summary: 15 voted for; None voted against; None abstained
- Result: Adopted

Security Council composition
- Permanent members: China; France; Russia; United Kingdom; United States
- Non-permanent members: Austria; Belgium; Cape Verde; Ecuador; Hungary; India; Japan; Morocco; Venezuela; Zimbabwe

United Nations Security Council resolution 769, adopted unanimously on 7 August 1992, after reaffirming Resolution 743 (1992) and all subsequent resolutions relating to the United Nations Protection Force (UNPROFOR), the Council authorised enlargements in the strength and mandate of UNPROFOR to "enable the Force to control the entry of civilians into the United Nations Protected Areas", in addition to performing immigration and customs functions.

The Council demanded co-operation with the Force and also condemned abuses committed against the civilian population, particularly on ethnic grounds.

== See also ==
- Breakup of Yugoslavia
- Bosnian War
- Croatian War of Independence
- List of United Nations Security Council Resolutions 701 to 800 (1991–1993)
- Slovenian Independence War
- Yugoslav Wars
- List of United Nations Security Council Resolutions related to the conflicts in former Yugoslavia
