= United Nations Security Council Resolution 749 =

UN Security Council Resolution 749
- Date: 7 April 1992
- Meeting no.: 3,066
- Code: S/RES/749 (Document)
- Subject: Socialist Federal Republic of Yugoslavia
- Voting summary: 15 voted for; None voted against; None abstained
- Result: Adopted

Security Council composition
- Permanent members: China; France; Russia; United Kingdom; United States
- Non-permanent members: Austria; Belgium; Cape Verde; Ecuador; Hungary; India; Japan; Morocco; Venezuela; Zimbabwe

United Nations Security Council resolution 749, adopted unanimously on 7 April 1992, after reaffirming resolutions 713 (1991), 721 (1991), 724 (1991), 727 (1992), 740 (1992) and 743 (1992), the Council approved of a report by the Secretary-General Boutros Boutros-Ghali and decided to authorise the earliest possible deployment of the United Nations Protection Force (UNPROFOR) in the former Yugoslavia.

Noting the continuous daily violations of the ceasefire, the Council called on all parties to ensure the safety and freedom of movement of the Force and urged all parties to help offset the costs of it to secure the most effective and cost-efficient operation as possible. It also urged co-operation of those in Bosnia and Herzegovina with the efforts of the European Community, urging all parties to refrain from where UNPROFOR will be based.

Despite being fully authorised in Resolution 749, UNPROFOR was not fully deployed until May–June 1992. The passing of the current resolution also occurred on the same day many Western nations recognised the independence of Bosnia and Herzegovina, Croatia and Slovenia.

== See also ==
- Bosnian War
- Croatian War of Independence
- List of United Nations Security Council Resolutions 701 to 800 (1991–1993)
- Ten-Day War
- Yugoslav Wars
- List of United Nations Security Council Resolutions related to the conflicts in former Yugoslavia
