= Miljevci, Dalmatia =

Region in Šibenik-Knin County, Croatia

Miljevci Plateau
- Location within Croatia

Highest point
- Coordinates: 43°53′20″N 16°03′20″E

Miljevci or Miljevci plateau is a small region in Šibenik-Knin County in Croatia that includes seven villages. The plateau has an area of over 100 square kilometers and is located between the rivers of Krka, Čikola and mountain Promina. Miljevci is only a few kilometers from the town of Drniš in the east, and across the Visovac Monastery in the west. The majority of the population are Croats.

The villages of Miljevci have a total population of 1,096 (census 2011):

- Bogatić (population 94)
- Brištane (population 174)
- Drinovci (population 164)
- Kaočine (population 203)
- Karalić (population 108)
- Ključ (population 162)
- Širitovci (population 191)

== See also ==
- Drniš
- Miljevci plateau incident
