= United Nations Security Council Resolution 740 =

UN Security Council Resolution 740
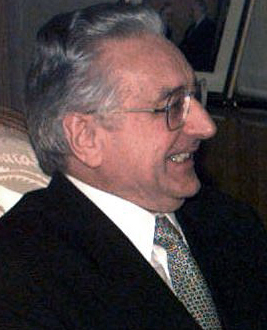
- Franjo Tuđman
- Date: 7 February 1992
- Meeting no.: 3,049
- Code: S/RES/740 (Document)
- Subject: Socialist Federal Republic of Yugoslavia
- Voting summary: 15 voted for; None voted against; None abstained
- Result: Adopted

Security Council composition
- Permanent members: China; France; Russia; United Kingdom; United States
- Non-permanent members: Austria; Belgium; Cape Verde; Ecuador; Hungary; India; Japan; Morocco; Venezuela; Zimbabwe

United Nations Security Council resolution 740, adopted unanimously on 7 February 1992, after reaffirming resolutions 713 (1991), 721 (1991), 724 (1991) and 727 (1992) and considering a report by the Secretary-General Boutros Boutros-Ghali, the Council approved plans for a peacekeeping mission in the Socialist Federal Republic of Yugoslavia.

The Council expressed its desire to deploy the force after the "remaining obstacle in the way" is removed, calling on the Serbian leaders to accept the United Nations peace plan. Then Croatian President Franjo Tuđman had accepted the plan. It also approved the increase of the military liaison commission to a total of 75 officers, up from 50.

The resolution went on to call on all parties to co-operate with the Conference on Yugoslavia to reach a settlement of the issue consistent with the principles of the Organization for Security and Co-operation in Europe, and also to all states to continue to observe the arms embargo on the country.

== See also ==
- Arbitration Commission of the Peace Conference on the former Yugoslavia
- Bosnian War
- Croatian War of Independence
- List of United Nations Security Council Resolutions 701 to 800 (1991–1993)
- Slovenian Independence War
- United Nations Protection Force
- Yugoslav Wars
- List of United Nations Security Council Resolutions related to the conflicts in former Yugoslavia
