= United Nations Security Council Resolution 727 =

UN Security Council Resolution 727
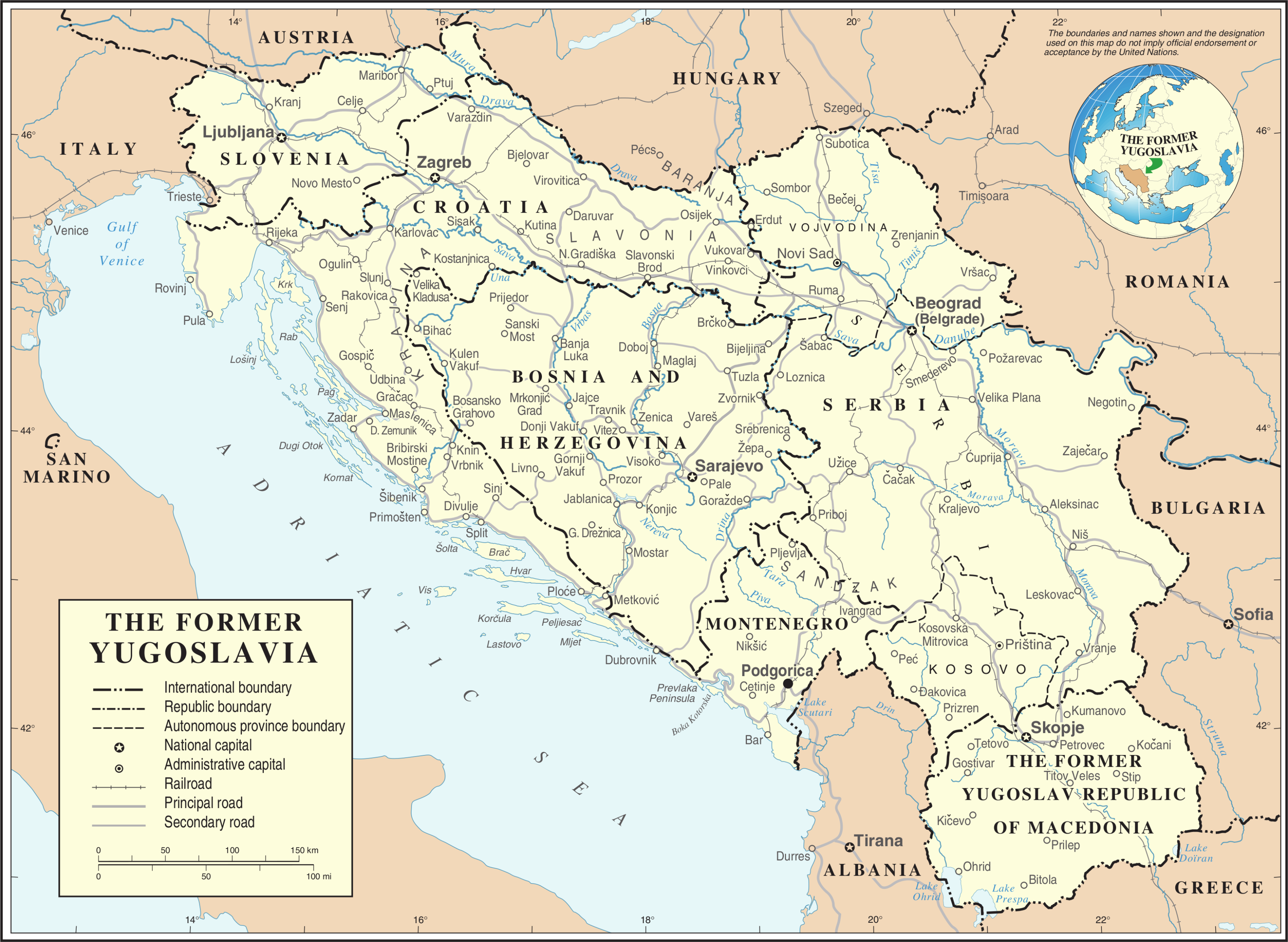
- Former Yugoslavia
- Date: 8 January 1992
- Meeting no.: 3,028
- Code: S/RES/727 (Document)
- Subject: Socialist Federal Republic of Yugoslavia
- Voting summary: 15 voted for; None voted against; None abstained
- Result: Adopted

Security Council composition
- Permanent members: China; France; Russia; United Kingdom; United States
- Non-permanent members: Austria; Belgium; Cape Verde; Ecuador; Hungary; India; Japan; Morocco; Venezuela; Zimbabwe

United Nations Security Council resolution 727, adopted unanimously on 8 January 1992, after reaffirming resolutions 713 (1991), 721 (1991), 724 (1991) and considering a report by the Secretary-General Boutros Boutros-Ghali, the council welcomed the recent signing of an agreement in Sarajevo regarding a ceasefire to the conflicts in the Socialist Federal Republic of Yugoslavia.

The council also endorsed a recommendation by the Secretary-General in his report and authorised the dispatch of 50 military liaison officers to promote the maintenance of the ceasefire, urging all parties to the agreement at Sarajevo to honour the agreement. It also urged the parties to ensure the safety of all personnel from the United Nations and European Community visiting the region, and reaffirmed the arms embargo applied to all republics of Yugoslavia.

== See also ==
- Croatian War of Independence
- List of United Nations Security Council Resolutions 701 to 800 (1991–1993)
- Slovenian Independence War
- United Nations Protection Force
- Yugoslav Wars
- List of United Nations Security Council Resolutions related to the conflicts in former Yugoslavia
