= United Nations Security Council Resolution 743 =

UN Security Council Resolution 743
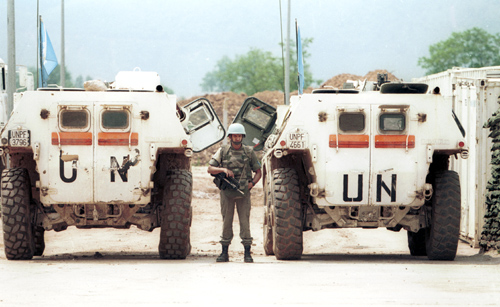
- United Nations Protection Force
- Date: 21 February 1992
- Meeting no.: 3,055
- Code: S/RES/743 (Document)
- Subject: Socialist Federal Republic of Yugoslavia
- Voting summary: 15 voted for; None voted against; None abstained
- Result: Adopted

Security Council composition
- Permanent members: China; France; Russia; United Kingdom; United States
- Non-permanent members: Austria; Belgium; Cape Verde; Ecuador; Hungary; India; Japan; Morocco; Venezuela; Zimbabwe

United Nations Security Council resolution 743, adopted unanimously on 21 February 1992, after reaffirming resolutions 713 (1991), 721 (1991), 724 (1991), 727 (1992) and 740 (1992), and considering that the situation in the Socialist Federal Republic of Yugoslavia constituted a threat to international peace and stability, the council established a peacekeeping mission in the country, known as the United Nations Protection Force (UNPROFOR), with the aim of reaching a peaceful political settlement in the region.

The council also decided to deploy the Force for an initial period of twelve months, further deciding that the arms embargo on Yugoslavia should not apply to weapons and military equipment intended for UNPROFOR. It requested the Secretary-General Boutros Boutros-Ghali to take measures to deploy the Force as soon as possible, subject to approval by the council, including a budget which will be partly offset by the Yugoslav parties but noting that UNPROFOR is an interim arrangement. Financing was discussed at the General Assembly on 19 March 1992. The resolution also required him to submit reports as appropriate and not less than every six months, with the first report due within two months on the progress in the region.

Resolution 743 also urged and demanded all parties in the region observe the ceasefire and ensure the safety of UNPROFOR, calling again on the Yugoslav parties to co-operate with the Conference on Yugoslavia. It also requested international support for the Force, particularly with regard to the transit of personnel and equipment.

The initial strength of the United Nations Protection Force, not authorised under Chapter VII, consisted of around 13,000 troops, 100 military observers and 530 police personnel. It was the second largest United Nations peacekeeping operation in history, covering all of Yugoslavia except for Slovenia, and would remain in place until the Dayton Agreement went into effect on 20 December 1995.

== See also ==
- Bosnian War
- Croatian War of Independence
- List of United Nations Security Council Resolutions 701 to 800 (1991–1993)
- Slovenian Independence War
- Yugoslav Wars
- List of United Nations Security Council Resolutions related to the conflicts in former Yugoslavia
