= United Nations Security Council Resolution 724 =

UN Security Council Resolution 724
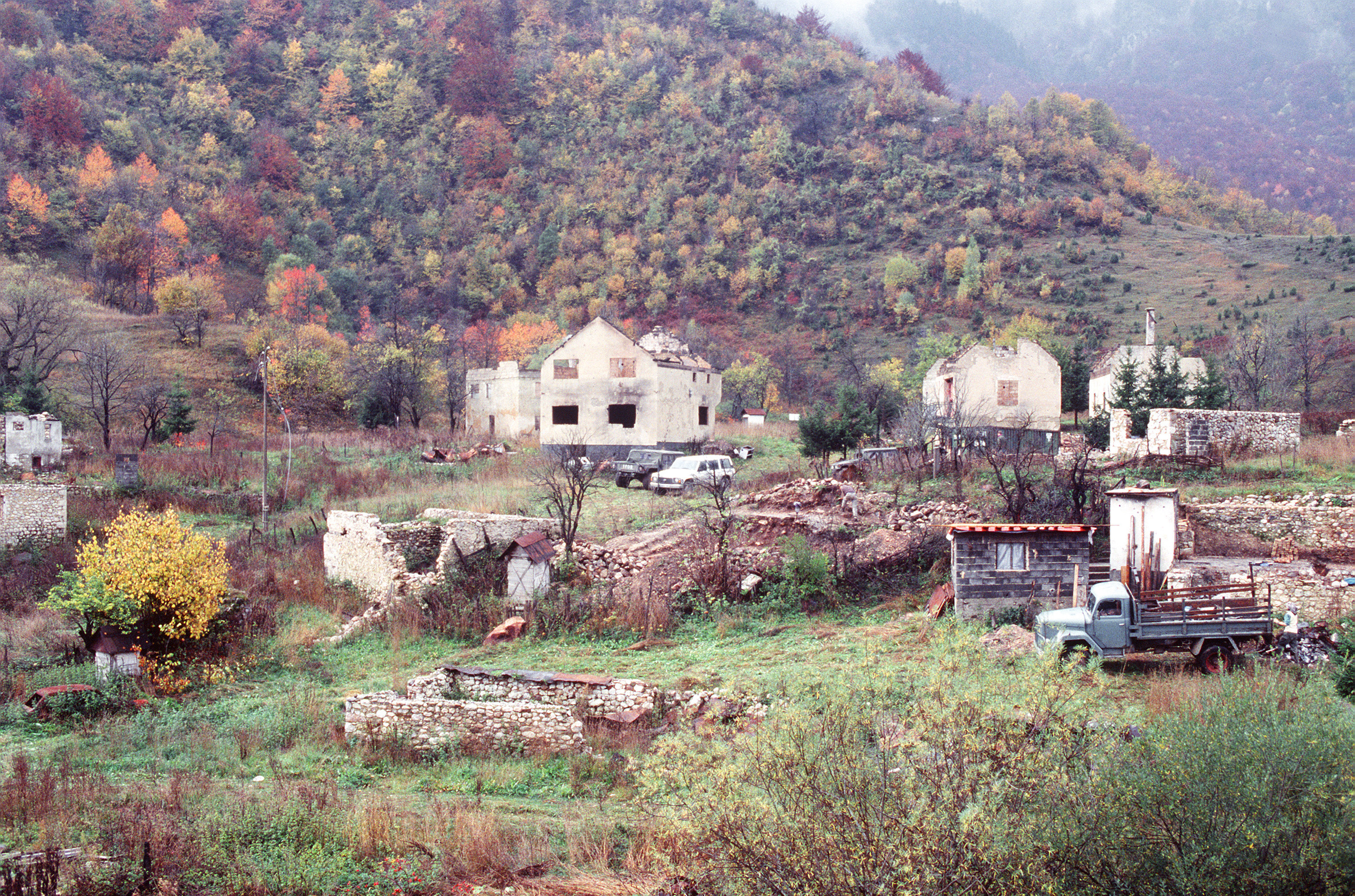
- Destroyed village of Trnovo during the wars
- Date: 15 December 1991
- Meeting no.: 3,023
- Code: S/RES/724 (Document)
- Subject: Socialist Federal Republic of Yugoslavia
- Voting summary: 15 voted for; None voted against; None abstained
- Result: Adopted

Security Council composition
- Permanent members: China; France; Soviet Union; United Kingdom; United States
- Non-permanent members: Austria; Belgium; Côte d'Ivoire; Cuba; Ecuador; India; Romania; Yemen; Zaire; Zimbabwe

United Nations Security Council resolution 724, adopted unanimously on 15 December 1991, after reaffirming resolutions 713 (1991) and 721 (1991) and noting a report by the Secretary-General Javier Pérez de Cuéllar on the situation in the Socialist Federal Republic of Yugoslavia, the council agreed to carry forward proposals for a planned peacekeeping operation in Yugoslavia and decided to establish a committee of the Security Council to consider matters relating to the arms embargo on the country.

Acting under Chapter VII of the United Nations Charter, the council requested all Member States to report on the measures they have taken to implement a general and complete embargo on all weapons and military equipment to Yugoslavia. It also decided to establish a committee of the Security Council to examine the measures Member States they have taken, including violations of the embargo and ways to strengthen it, requesting all Member States co-operate with the committee. The powers of the committee would be extended to other areas in subsequent resolutions on the situation.

The resolution also encouraged the Secretary-General to pursue humanitarian efforts in Yugoslavia, in conjunction with Member States and international organisations to address the needs of the civilian population.

Resolution 724 was the last Security Council resolution the Soviet Union participated in before the dissolution of the Soviet Union was finalized 11 days later on 26 December. The Soviet Union's permanent seat on the Security Council was taken by the Russian Federation.

== See also ==
- Croatian War of Independence
- List of United Nations Security Council Resolutions 701 to 800 (1991–1993)
- Slovenian Independence War
- United Nations Protection Force
- Yugoslav Wars
- List of United Nations Security Council Resolutions related to the conflicts in former Yugoslavia
