= United Nations Security Council Resolution 721 =

UN Security Council Resolution 721
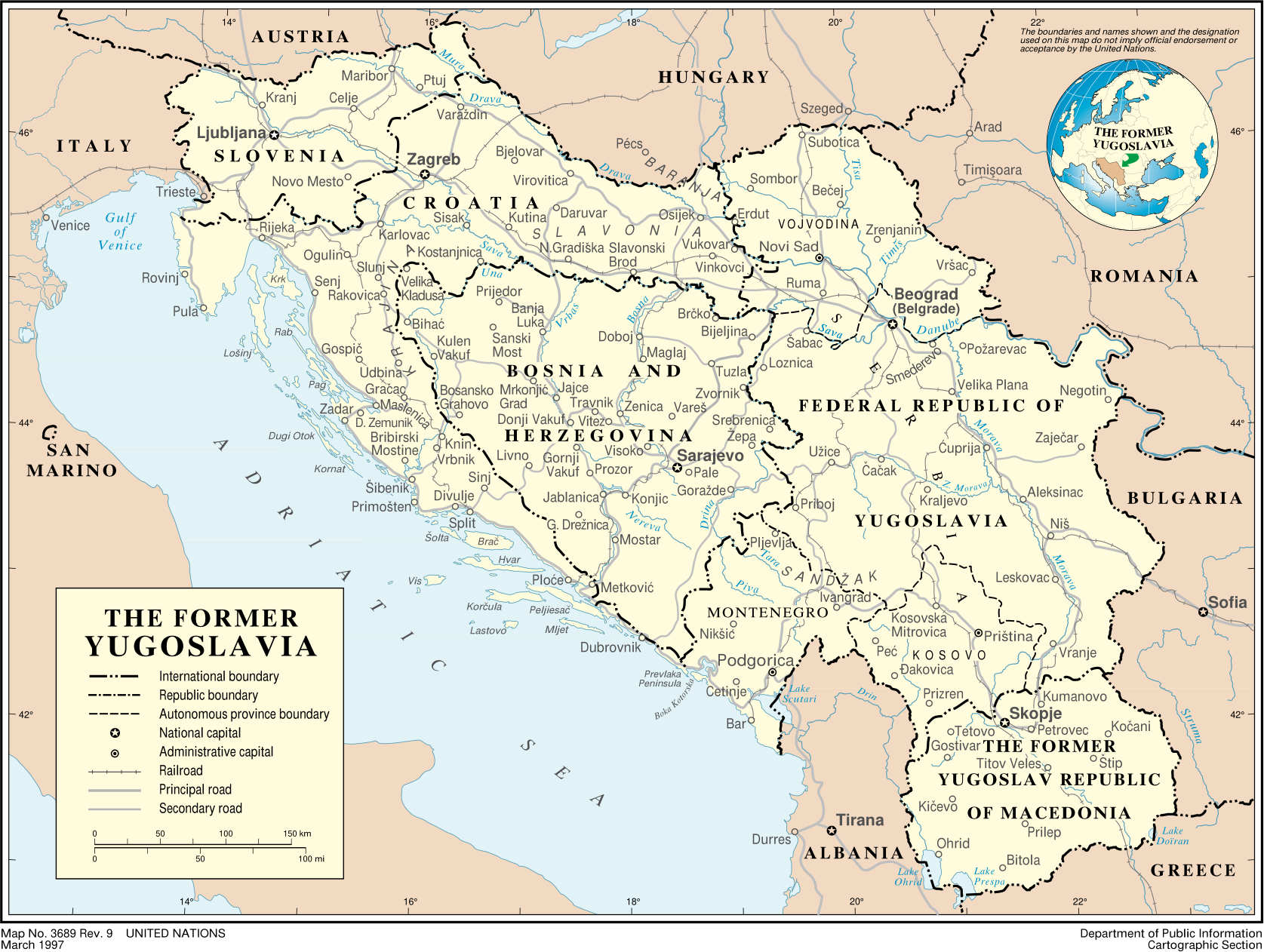
- A United Nations map of the former Yugoslavia, showing how it would have appeared immediately after its breakup in 1992.
- Date: 27 November 1991
- Meeting no.: 3,018
- Code: S/RES/721 (Document)
- Subject: Socialist Federal Republic of Yugoslavia
- Voting summary: 15 voted for; None voted against; None abstained
- Result: Adopted

Security Council composition
- Permanent members: China; France; Soviet Union; United Kingdom; United States
- Non-permanent members: Austria; Belgium; Côte d'Ivoire; Cuba; Ecuador; India; Romania; Yemen; Zaire; Zimbabwe

United Nations Security Council resolution 721, adopted unanimously on 27 November 1991, after reaffirming Resolution 713 (1991) on the situation in the SFR Yugoslavia, the council strongly supported the efforts of the Secretary-General Javier Pérez de Cuéllar and his Personal Envoy to help end the outbreak of fighting in parts of the country, in the hope of establishing a peacekeeping mission.

The Council noted however, that the deployment of a peacekeeping mission cannot take place without the parties involved fully observing the ceasefire agreements signed. The resolution also noted that the council will examine recommendations of the Secretary-General including the recommendation of establishing a possible peacekeeping mission in the country.

== See also ==
- Croatian War of Independence
- List of United Nations Security Council Resolutions 701 to 800 (1991–1993)
- Slovenian Independence War
- United Nations Protection Force
- Yugoslav Wars
- List of United Nations Security Council Resolutions related to the conflicts in former Yugoslavia
