= United Nations Protection Force =

- United Nations Protection Force insignia worn by military observers
- Active: 1992–1995
- Role: Peacekeeping
- Size: 38,000
- Part of: United Nations
- Colors: Blue
- Engagements: Croatian War of Independence (1991–1995); Bosnian War (1992–1995)

Commanders
- Notable commanders: General Bernard Janvier

The United Nations Protection Force (UNPROFOR; also known by its French acronym FORPRONU: Force de Protection des Nations Unies) was the first United Nations peacekeeping force in Croatia and in Bosnia and Herzegovina during the Yugoslav Wars. The force was formed in February 1992 and its mandate ended in March 1995, with the peacekeeping mission restructuring into three other forces (the United Nations Preventive Deployment Force (UNPREDEP) in the Republic of Macedonia, and the United Nations Confidence Restoration Operation in Croatia (UNCRO) in Croatia, with restructured UNPROFOR operations ongoing in Bosnia and Herzegovina until their replacement by NATO and EU missions in December 1995).

== Personnel ==
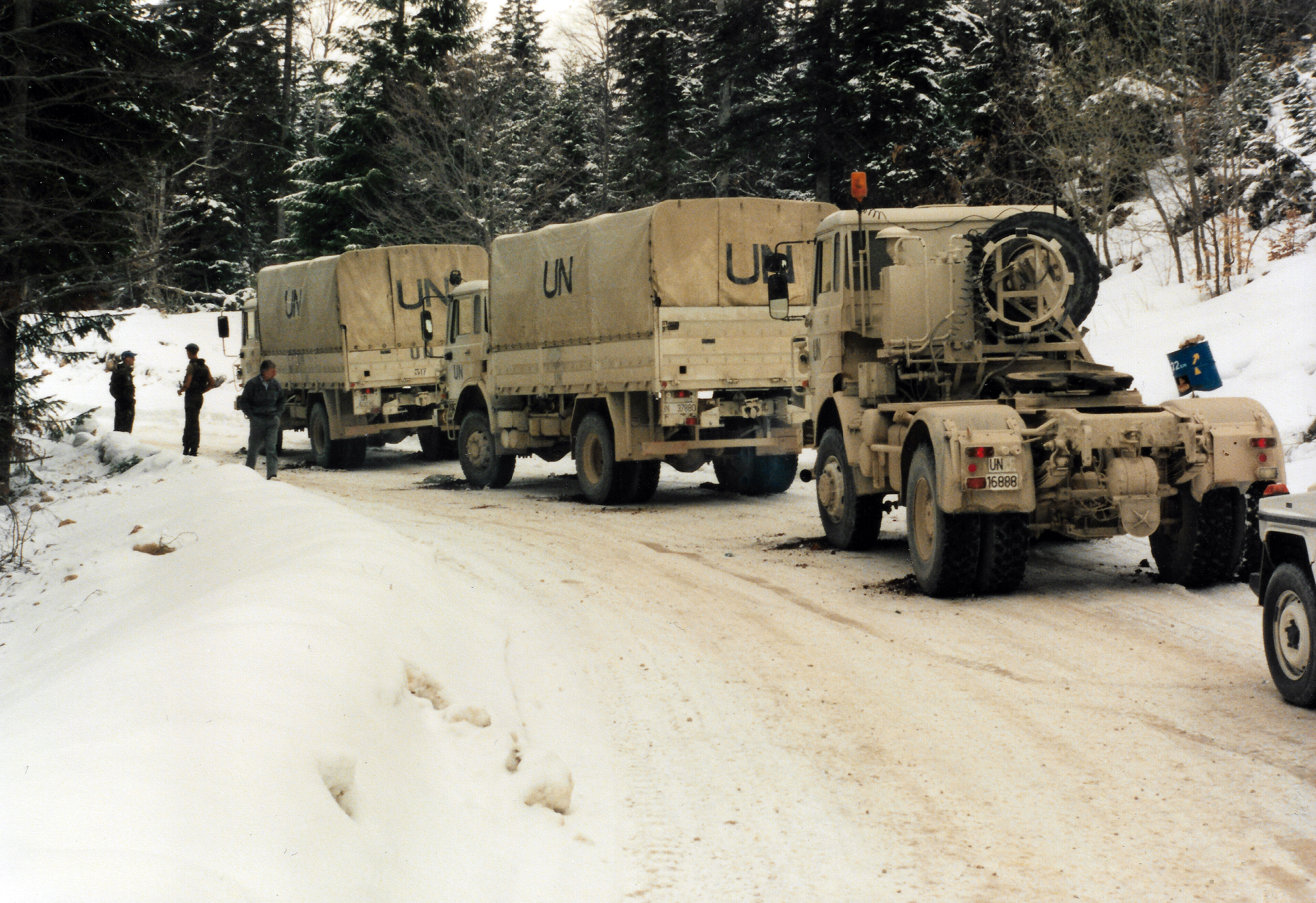
UNPROFOR Dutch transport battalion en route in Bosnia-Herzegovina. Route Triangel April 1995

UNPROFOR was composed of nearly 25,000 personnel. It consisted of troops from Argentina, Australia, Bangladesh, Belgium, Brazil, Canada, Colombia, Czech Republic, Denmark, Egypt, Estonia, Finland, France, Germany, Ghana, India, Indonesia, Ireland, Italy, Jordan, Kenya, Lithuania, Luxembourg, Malaysia, Nepal, Netherlands, New Zealand, Nigeria, Norway, Pakistan, Poland, Portugal, the Russian Federation, Slovak Republic, Spain, Sweden, Switzerland, Tunisia, Turkey, Ukraine, the United Kingdom and the United States. According to the UN, there were 167 fatalities amongst UNPROFOR personnel during the course of the force's mandate. Of those who died, three were military observers, 159 were other military personnel, one was a member of the civilian police, two were international civilian staff and two were local staff.

The commanders of UNPROFOR were:

Name	Country	From	To
Lieutenant-General Satish Nambiar	India	March 1992	March 1993
Lieutenant-General Lars-Eric Wahlgren	Sweden	March 1993	June 1993
General Jean Cot	France	June 1993	March 1994
General Bertrand de Sauville de La Presle	France	March 1994	March 1995
General Bernard Janvier	France	March 1995	January 1996

Prominent officers :

- Major-General Lewis MacKenzie (Canada) Sector Sarajevo 1992
- General Philippe Morillon (France) from October 1992 to July 1993
- Lieutenant-General Francis Briquemont (Belgium) 12 July 1993 to 24 January 1994
- Lieutenant-General Sir Michael Rose (United Kingdom) from 24 January 1994 to 25 February 1995
- Lieutenant-General Rupert Smith (United Kingdom) from 25 February 1995

== Mandate ==
=== Croatia ===
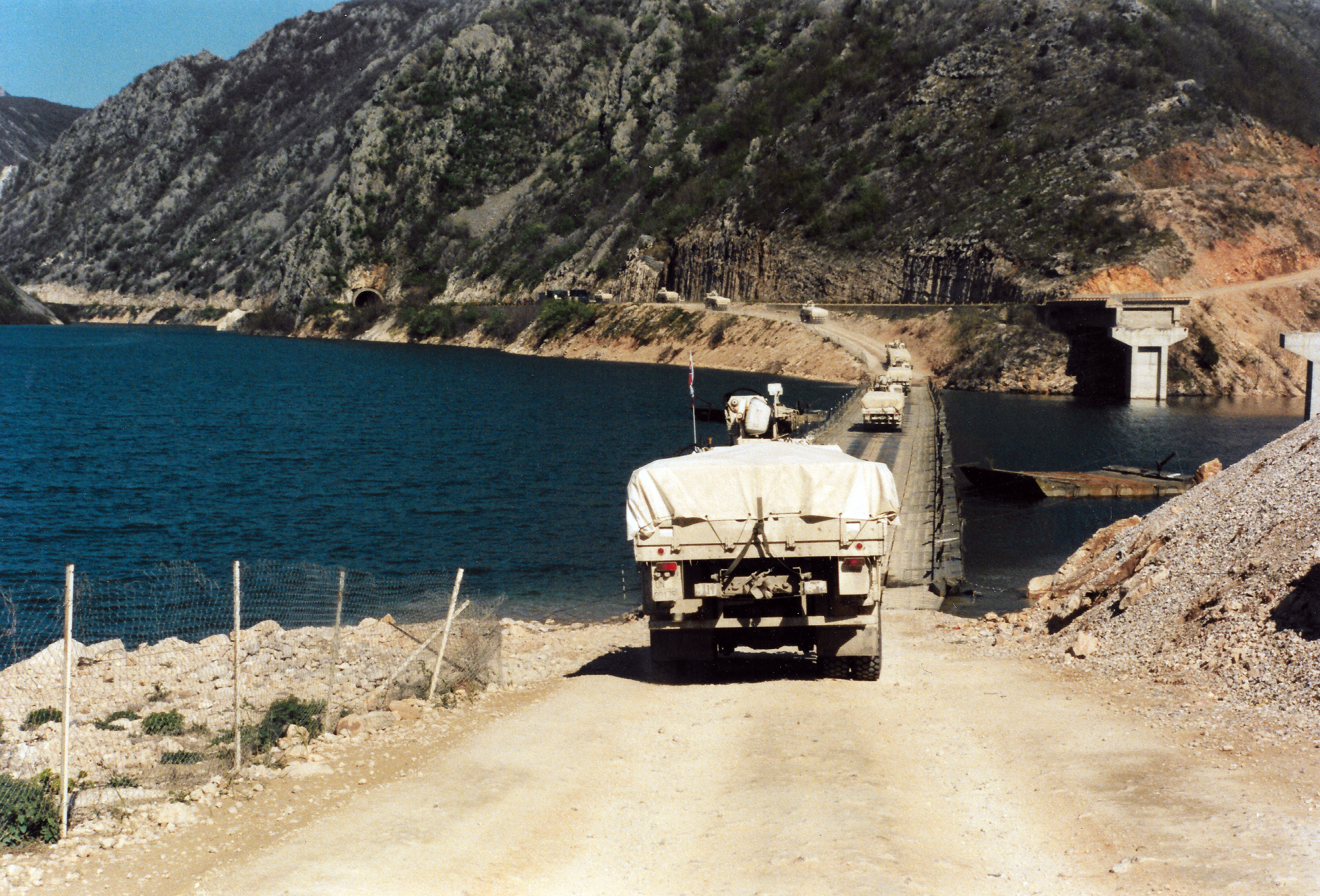
Dutch UN transport battalion crossing a pontoon bridge over the river Neretva from the M17 towards the west.

UNPROFOR was created by UN Security Council Resolution 743 on 21 February 1992 during the Croatian War of Independence. The initial mandate of UNPROFOR was to ensure stable conditions for peace talks, and security in three demilitarized "safe-haven" enclaves designated as United Nations Protected Areas (UNPAs). These were located in various regions before the Republic of Croatia received full membership status in the United Nations (UN), but were controlled by the self-styled Republic of Serbian Krajina.

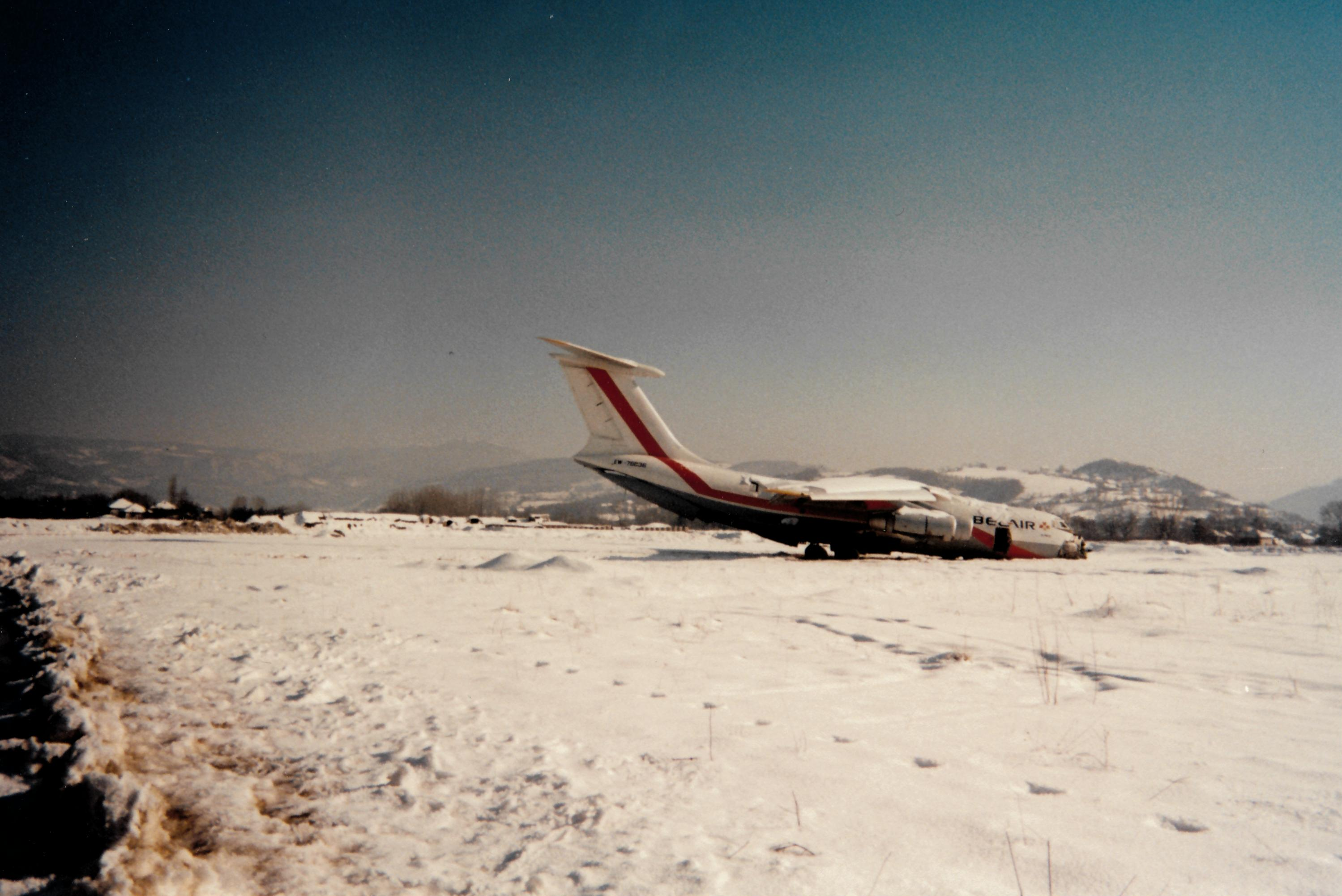
The only airplane visible on Sarajevo airport, beyond repair since the beginning of the war. The airport was on the frontline between the Serbs and Bosnian Muslims.

In 1992, the mandate was extended to so-called "pink zones" controlling access to the UNPAs (UNSC Resolution 762), some border control and monitoring of civilian access to the Pink Zones (UNSC Resolution 769), and control of the demilitarisation of the Prevlaka peninsula near Dubrovnik (UNSC Resolution 779).

=== Bosnia and Herzegovina ===
In contrast to that of Croatia, the UNPROFOR mandate for Bosnia and Herzegovina was not to monitor a preexisting cease-fire. The mandate can essentially be divided into four phases:

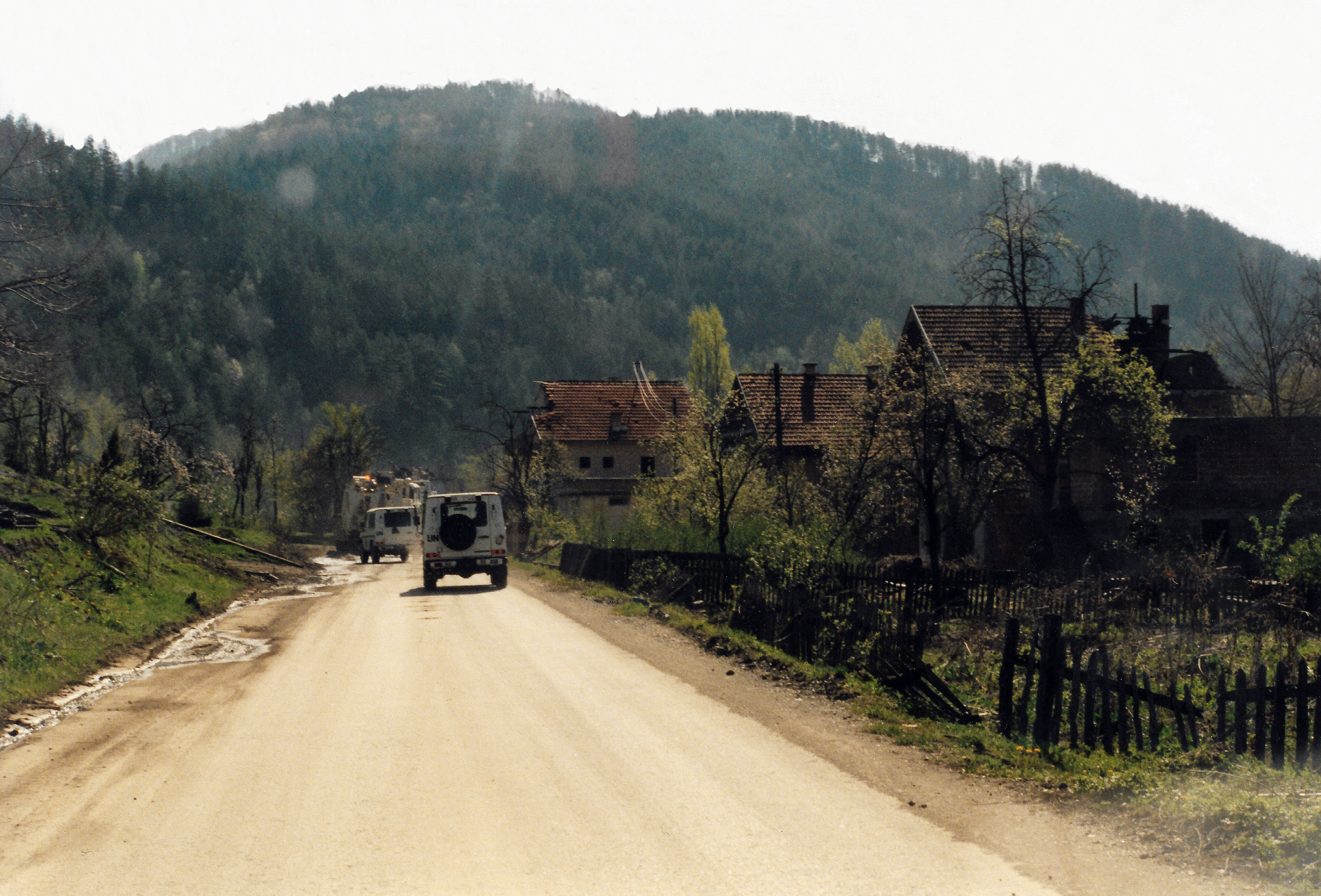
Dutch UN transport battalion in No man's land near Serbian position. Armed guidance. April 1995

- Phase 1: Aid to Sarajevo - Beginning on 5 June 1992, UNPROFOR was responsible for the protection of Sarajevo airport as mandated by Resolution 758 for humanitarian purposes. UNPROFOR would run a security corridor for aid convoys between the airport and the city.
- Phase 2: Escort of Humanitarian Aid - On 14 September 1992, UNPROFOR was given a mandate (United Nations Security Council Resolution 776) by the United Nations Security Council to provide protection to humanitarian organisations such as the International Committee of the Red Cross, and other activities as requested by the United Nations High Commissioner for Refugees such as scheduling convoys and negotiating safe passage. The Force would also be permitted to use self-defence if armed persons attempted to prevent it from carrying out its mandate.
- Phase 3: The Protection of Safe Areas - The next expansion of the mandate was on 16 April 1993 with United Nations Security Council Resolution 819 declaring the town of Srebrenica a "safe area" free "from armed attack or any other hostile act." In May 1993, Bihać, Sarajevo, Goražde, Žepa and Tuzla were also added as "safe areas".
- Phase 4: Monitoring the Muslim-Croat Federation and Weapons Exclusion Zones - Eventually, UNPROFOR monitored a US-brokered cease-fires in Bosnia in February 1994, creating the Muslim-Croat Federation. UNPROFOR was responsible for monitoring the zones of separation and weapons control points. In addition, the UNSC increased UNPROFOR's authorized strength to monitor weapons exclusion zones, but never actually altered the operation's mandate.

On 31 March 1995, UNPROFOR was restructured into three coordinated peace operations. On 20 December 1995, the forces of UNPROFOR were reflagged under the NATO-led Implementation Force (IFOR), whose task was to implement the General Framework Agreement for Peace in Bosnia and Herzegovina (GFAP – otherwise known as the Dayton Accords or Dayton Agreement).

== Course of action ==
=== February 1992 – March 1993 ===
Cedric Thornberry was director of UNPROFOR Civil Affairs at the beginning of the mission in February 1992. By the end of its first mandate in March 1993, UNPROFOR had some success in restoring peace in Croatia, notably obtaining the removal of the Yugoslav People's Army (JNA) in May 1992. However, civil unrest was such that terror, discrimination and ethnic cleansing were still present. Local Serb forces managed to complete their cleansing of the UNPA areas, started in 1991, that left only 279 Croats there out of a pre-war population of 102,000.

The situation was problematic, mostly due to non-cooperation by local Serb authorities, and because of later major Croat military offensives. Additionally, the situation for which UNPROFOR had been designed and anticipated for had significantly changed. The Croat side now refused to negotiate its sovereignty on the UNPAs and Pink Zones, which the Serb part would not accept. Establishment of the "Republic of Serbian Krajina" further complicated the situation.

The Opening of the Sarajevo Airport was conducted by the Canadian Operational Force, which moved within the Theater of Operations from Croatia (Surac) to the combat zone of Sarajevo. The Canadian Force included the French-speaking Royal 22^{e} Régiment, with the attachment of N Company of the English-speaking 3rd Battalion, The Royal Canadian Regiment. The Canadian Contingent was deployed by train from Canadian Forces Base Baden-Soellingen and CFB Lahr, Germany.

In spite of hostile actions, Sarajevo international airport had successfully remained open. In the period from 3 July 1992 to 31 January 1993, the humanitarian airlift organised by UNHCR under UNPROFOR protection brought in 2,476 aircraft carrying 27,460 tons of food, medicines and other relief goods.

Distribution of humanitarian aid was disrupted due to non-cooperation and even hostile actions (mines, small arms fire, RPG) of the parties in the field, especially from the Bosnian Serb forces. Nonetheless, from November 1992 to January 1993, a total of some 34,600 tons of relief supplies had been delivered to an estimated 800,000 beneficiaries in 110 locations throughout Bosnia and Herzegovina.

=== March 1993 – February 1994 ===
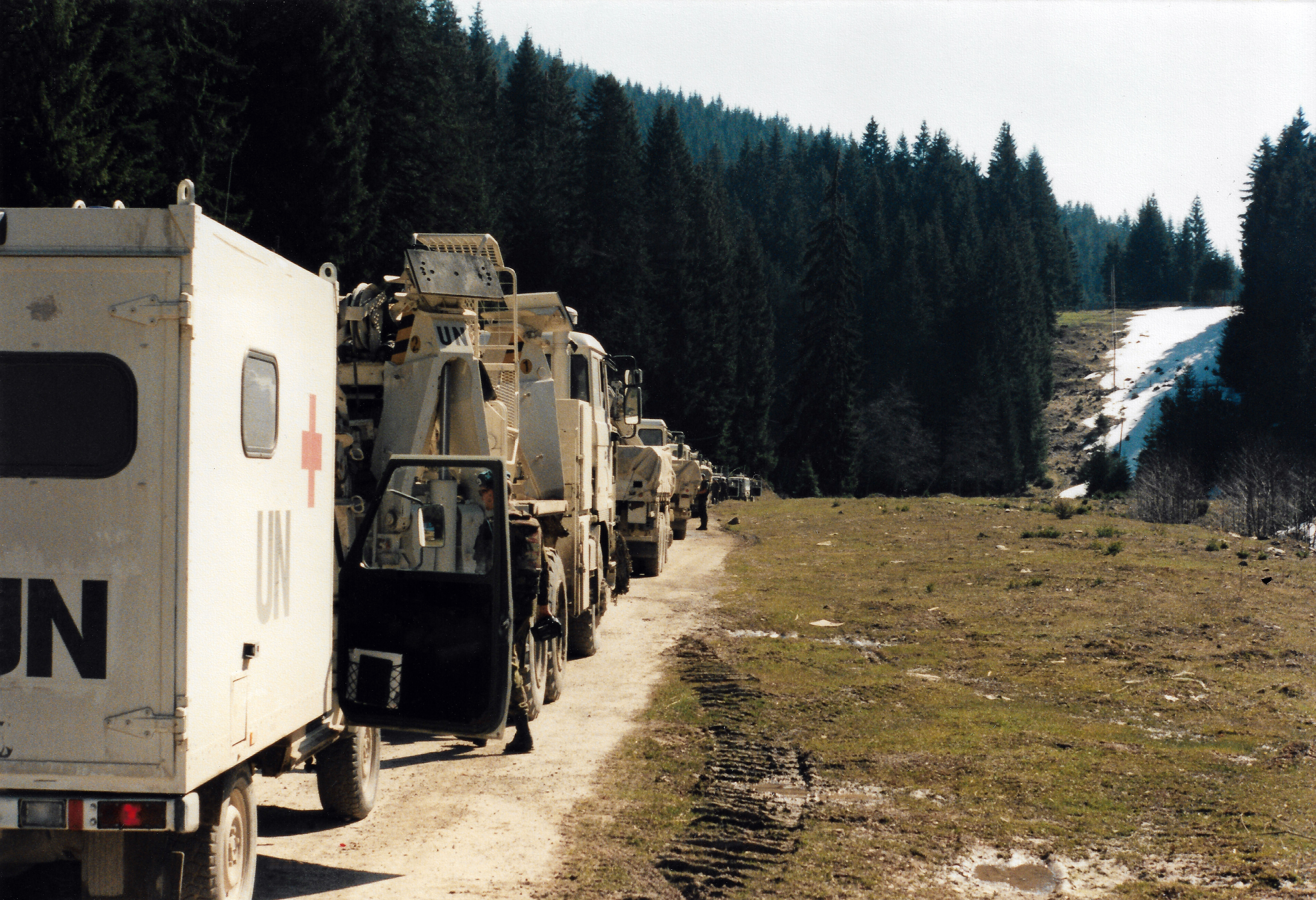
Dutch transport battalion en route in Bosnia-Herzegovina. Route Triangel April 1995

==== Croat incursions ====
On 6 July 1993, new tensions arose following the Croatian government's decision to re-open the strategic Maslenica bridge on 18 July – Croatia was cut in half while the bridge was in Serb hands. The UNPROFOR forces who were mandated to monitor the Croat forces' withdrawal from the area had been unable to deploy, due to the refusal of access by Croat authorities. The Serbs shelled the bridge, partially destroying it on 2 August. On 12 August, negotiations for a cease-fire began in Geneva, but were unsuccessful. Eventually, Croat forces retreated to their positions previously occupied before the incursion.

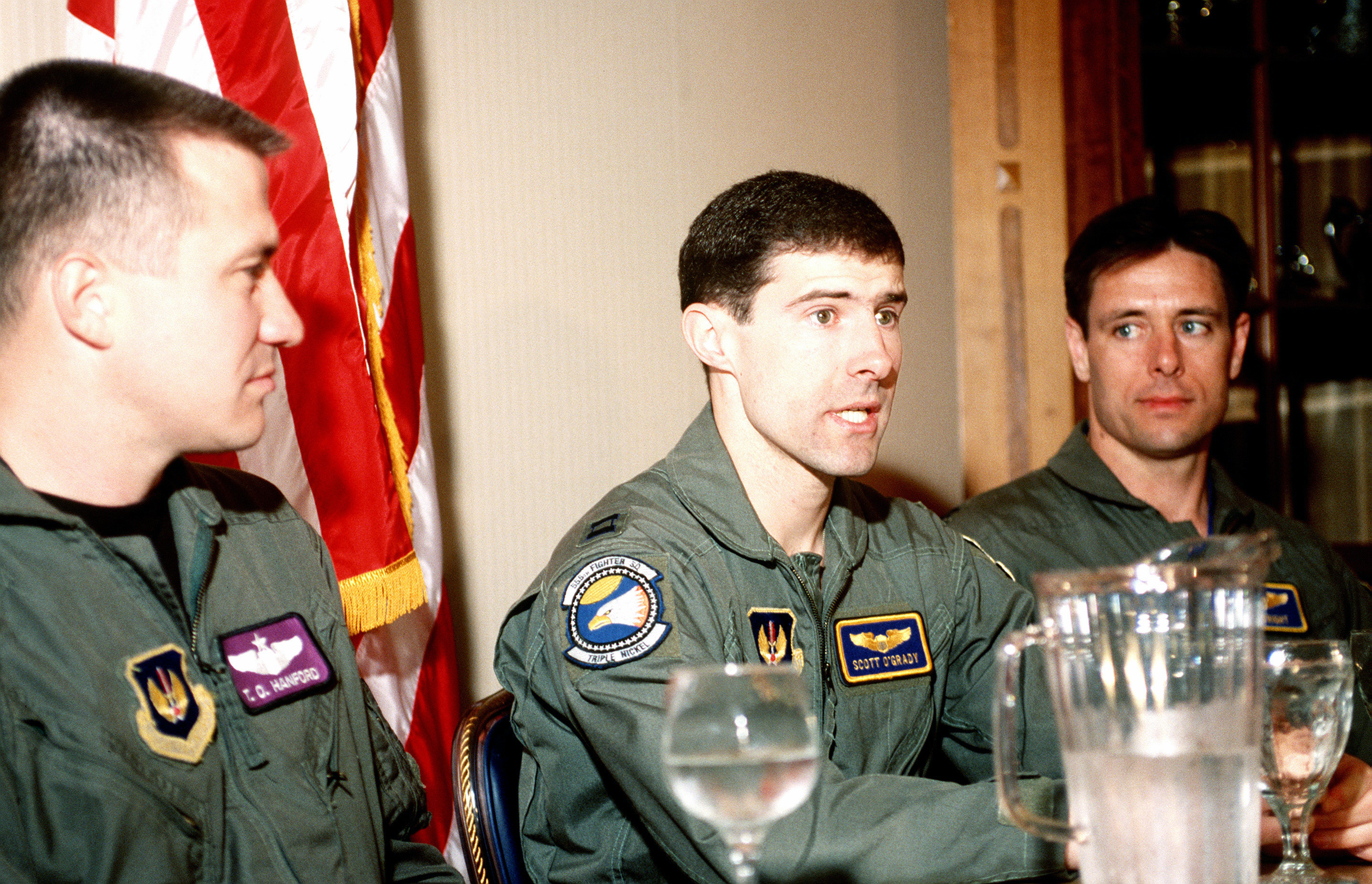
Captain Scott F. O'Grady (centre), whose F-16 Fighting Falcon was shot down over Bosnia on 2 June 1995, while he was flying in support of Operation Deny Flight.

==== Operation "Deny Flight" ====
In mid-March, unidentified airplanes dropped bombs onto villages in the vicinity of Srebrenica, violating the "No-Flight zones" for the first time. The Bosnian Serbs were accused of the bombing but denied responsibility. On 31 March, a resolution was voted authorising the nations contributing to UNPROFOR to take "all necessary measures" to prevent military flights from the belligerents in the no-flight zones ("Operation Deny Flight"). French, Dutch, and American airplanes were deployed to enforce the resolution. In total, until 1 December 1994, 3317 violations were observed. On 28 February 1994, four military aircraft were shot down by NATO fighter jets over Bosnia and Herzegovina.

==== Safe areas ====
From March 1993, Serb paramilitary units killed a great number of civilians, destroyed habitations, prevented the UNHCR from delivering humanitarian aid, and forced thousands of Bosnian refugees to flee to the town of Srebrenica. As many as 30 to 40 persons per day were dying from military action, starvation, exposure to cold or lack of medical treatment. Resolution 819 attempted to address this issue by declaring Srebrenica a "Safe Area". Resolution 836 authorized UNPROFOR "acting in self-defense, to take the necessary measures, including the use of force, in reply to bombardments against the safe areas by any of the parties or to armed incursion into them or in the event of any deliberate obstruction in or around those areas to the freedom of movement of UNPROFOR, or of protected humanitarian convoys". To implement the deterrence, around 7,600 reinforcements were sent and air support was organised in coordination with NATO.

==== War in Bosnia ====
In May 1993, intense fighting broke out in Central Bosnia between Bosnian Muslims and Bosnian Croats. Croat paramilitary forces committed atrocities against Serbs and Bosnians, such as the massacre in the village of Ahmići, on 16 April 1993. Tihomir Blaškić, an officer of the Croat HVO army formation, was tried and convicted at the ICTY over his responsibility for this massacre. Blaškić served almost nine years in prison before the appeals panel acquitted him of most of the charges in July 2004. The defence proved he did not command all the HVO units in the area or any paramilitary units.

On 24 September, the Security Council was informed by the Croatian Government that if the mandate of UNPROFOR was not amended to promote energetic implementation of the relevant resolutions of the Security Council, Croatia would be forced to request UNPROFOR to leave the country no later than 30 November 1993. Subsequent redefinition of the mandate occurred.

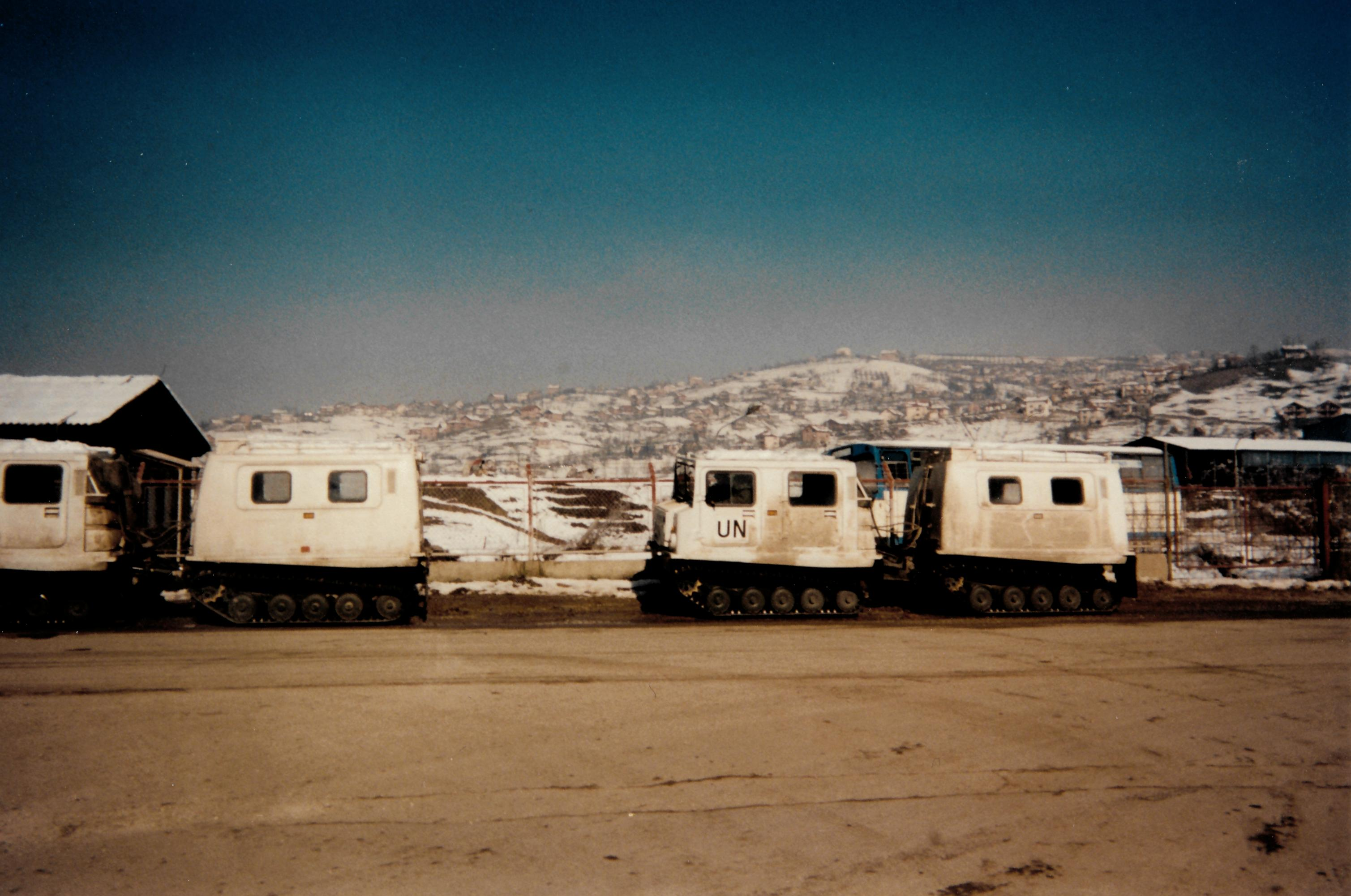
UN Bv206 light tracked "softskin" (unarmoured) vehicles in Sarajevo.

At the end of the year, the warring parties attempted to come to a cease-fire. The truce was implemented between Croat and Serb forces, but fighting went on in Bosnia between Bosnian Muslims and Croats, and the humanitarian situation continued to deteriorate. Notably, Sarajevo continued to be bombarded by Bosnian Serb forces. It was also reported that regular Croat army units were supporting Bosnian Croat forces with heavy equipment and men, removing their insignias. This led to further protests from the UN. Use of force began to be discussed at a NATO summit held in Brussels on 10 and 11 January 1994. The Bosnian Serbs, following talks with high-ranking officials of the Russian Federation in Moscow, agreed to open the Tuzla airport for humanitarian purposes. At the same time, the relieving of UN troops in Srebrenica was allowed and the Canadian contingent was replaced by a Dutch contingent.

The situation in Sarajevo, however, remained extremely tense, with Bosnian Serb sniper fire deliberately aimed at civilians, and artillery and heavy mortar fire aimed at population areas. This strongly shaped Western public opinion, as a number of journalists were operating in Sarajevo, and murdered civilians were seen on the evening news on a regular basis. On 4 February 1994, a mortar shell struck a suburb of Sarajevo, killing 10 people and wounding 18. The next day, 5 February 1994, a mortar exploded in Sarajevo's Markale market, leaving 68 dead and 200 injured in what was so far the bloodiest incident in Sarajevo in 22 months of fighting. Exasperation at these provocations grew to the point where an ultimatum was sent, requiring the removal or surrender to UNPROFOR of all heavy guns 20 km from Sarajevo (Bosnian and Bosnian Serb, with an exception for Pale) within ten days. The ultimatum was satisfied on 17 February, with the heavy weapons that were not removed being regrouped in seven UNPROFOR-controlled spots.

On 23 February 1994, the cease-fire was brokered between Croat and Bosnian forces – the Washington Agreement – which ended their one-year-long war and united the sides as the Federation of Bosnia and Herzegovina. UNPROFOR's role in this was to monitor the cease-fire, help rebuild local infrastructure, and staff checkpoints within the federation area.

=== March 1994 – November 1994 ===
==== Positive developments and extension of mandate ====
On 24 March 1994, a plan for the re-opening of the Tuzla airport, for UNPROFOR and humanitarian use only, was published.

On 29 March 1994, in Zagreb, representatives of the Government of Croatia and the local Serb authorities in UNPAs concluded a cease-fire agreement aiming to achieve a lasting cessation of hostilities.

Concurrently, the mandate of UNPROFOR was extended for another six months, and reinforcements were sent, amounting to 10,000 troops, a few hundred policemen, and observers.

During 1994, UNPROFOR troops in Bosnia came under increased military attacks, resulting in several clashes (Operation Bøllebank, Operation Amanda) with Bosnian Serb forces.

==== Assault against safe areas ====
Shortly after the cease-fire between Croat and Serb forces, the Bosnian Serbs launched an assault against the Safe area of Goražde, heavily shelling the town and surrounding villages. Protests and exhortations from the UN Security Council turned out to be ineffective, and on 10 and 11 April 1994, NATO launched airstrikes against Bosnian Serb positions. In retaliation, Bosnian Serb forces captured many UN personnel, using them as human shields at sites expected to be bombed. The bombings turned out to be much less effective than the recent Gulf War, which had conditioned the public's understanding of airstrikes. In spite of NATO's demonstration of air power, and protests of good faith from the Serbs, the shelling continued. In a similar situation to what had happened in Sarajevo, an ultimatum was issued, and by the 24 April, most of the Serb troops had complied. These incidents led to another reflection about the status of the Safe Areas.

==== Attempts at peace ====
Several Peace Plans had been rejected (the Carrington-Cutiliero plan, the Vance-Owen plan, the "HMS Invincible" package, the Owen-Stoltenburg plan, and the European Union Action Plan). At the end of July, a blueprint was designed by the Contact Group, which consisted of the United States, United Kingdom, France, Germany and Russia, and was subsequently accepted by the Croat, Serb and Bosnian parties. The Bosnian Serbs, however, refused to accept the plan. In early August, in an attempt to coerce the Bosnian Serbs into accepting the plan, the Serbian government cut political and economic relationships with the Bosnian Serb leaders - a decision welcomed by the UN Security Council. On 23 September, the UN Security Council officially welcomed the agreement of the warring parties to the peace plan, condemned the Bosnian Serb refusal, and strengthened the sanctions against the Bosnian Serb entity.

==== Bosnian Serb Isolation ====
On 23 September 1994, in retaliation to the Bosnian Serb obstruction to the Peace Plan, the UN Security Council, adopted Resolution 942, severed all commercial and monetary links to the Bosnian Serb entity. Notably, this cut the flow of fuel to the Bosnian Serbs, which was a critical blow against their strategic military assets.

Due to the extreme position taken by the Bosnian Serb government, the Yugoslav Federation (Serbia and Montenegro) itself had to take a strong stance against the Bosnian Serb entity. This led to the quasi-complete diplomatic isolation of the Bosnian Serb entity.

==== Deterioration in security ====
In August 1994, the situation deteriorated again, as a result of sniper activity, despite the anti-sniper agreements. Sarajevo's "Sniper Alley" became infamous; deliberate attacks against UNPROFOR personnel or aircraft became frequent.

In October, the Bosnian Muslim forces, trapped in the Bihać pocket, attacked the Bosnian Serb forces in an attempt to end the siege of the city. The attack and the ensuing counter-attack by the Bosnian Serbs terrorized the local population, causing another massive exodus of refugees. Bosnian Serb airplanes attacked the Bihać area with cluster bombs and napalm, deliberately violating the "Safe Area" status of Bihać and the "No-flight" zones.

In reaction to this threat, on 21 November, NATO warplanes destroyed the Udbina airstrip, located in the UNPA Sector South in Croatia. The following days, NATO airplanes struck Bosnian Serb anti-air missiles sites that had previously fired upon British jets. NATO also carried out airstrikes against artillery sites which shelled Bihać. Instead of lowering their profile, the Bosnian Serbs retaliated by taking UN personnel hostage and restraining humanitarian aid transit.

On the diplomatic scene, all efforts to reach and implement a cease-fire fell short due to Bosnian Serb obstruction—Dr. Karadžić declined the invitation of the UN Secretary-General.

=== United Nations hostages and the Vrbanja bridge ===
On 12 March 1995, UNPROFOR made its first request for NATO air support, but close air support was not deployed, owing to a number of delays associated with the approval process.

On 10 and 11 April 1995, UNPROFOR called in air strikes to protect the Goražde safe area, resulting in the bombing of a Bosnian Serb military command outpost near Goražde by two U.S. General Dynamics F-16 Fighting Falcon fighter aircraft. This was the first time in NATO's history it had attacked ground targets with aircraft. Subsequently, Bosnian Serbs entered the Gorazde safe area. Serbian Army soldiers took 150 UN personnel hostage on 14 April. A British Sea Harrier was sent to scout the situation and potentially attack Serbian positions, but the Serbs were prepared. On 16 April 1995, a British Sea Harrier was shot down over Goražde by Bosnian Serb forces.

On 26 May 1995, following NATO air raids on Pale as the Bosnian Serbs defied another UN ultimatum on heavy weapons, around 400 Blue Helmets were taken hostage in different parts of Bosnia, brought to strategic points as human shields, and shown in chains on Serbian TV.

On 27 May 1995, General Mladić along with General Nuhić launched an assault against the UN observation point of the Vrbanja bridge. At 5 in the morning, the French captain commanding the position lost contact with the 12 men and went to investigate. A Serb dressed with a blue helmet, French body armour and uniform attempted to take him hostage, but was deterred by the UN escort, and the officer managed to escape. In the following hours, after intense shelling by ERC 90 Sagaie armoured vehicles, the French stormed the post, killing four Serbs and capturing four others. Two French soldiers were killed and 17 were wounded.

At 12 o'clock, the Bosnian Serb radio broadcast that General Mladić had ordered to

deploy the captured members of UNPROFOR, and the other foreign citizens who had acted as enemies of the Serbian people, at command posts, depots and other important facilities. The United Nations in this particular situation have decided to hire a murderer, it is called the NATO alliance. It is a hired killer. If NATO wishes to continue with its air strikes then it will have to kill the UN troops here on the ground, because we have positioned UN troops and observers around potential targets that NATO might decide to go for. The international community therefore will have to pay a very heavy price. And it will not stop at that. The Serbs are determined to make a point to the whole world.

— Jovan Zametica, Karadžić's spokesman

On the 30 May, Ratko Mladić phoned Rupert Smith and agreed to not place Blue Helmets hostages in chains, but to merely "bring" them to strategic sites. He also demanded apologies for the death of the four Serbian soldiers killed by the French at Vrbanja bridge, threatening to "be unable to guarantee the safety" of the UN forces in Goražde.

=== Fall of Srebrenica ===
On 12 July 1995 UNPROFOR failed to deter the Serb attack on Srebrenica because they were not able to sufficiently reinforce the Dutch battalion in place, and the city was subsequently overrun. When the dual key practices effectively prevented any serious air support from materialising, the Dutch began evacuating women and children. The Serbs held the Muslim men and massacred thousands of them. The safe area of Zepa also fell to Serb forces on 25 July. The events in Srebrenica led to the Peacekeeping Best Practices Unit (PBPU) report.

NATO initiated "Operation Deliberate Force" on 30 August 1995 in response to further provocations by Serb forces. At this point, UNPROFOR had become "militarily engaged" with NATO against the Bosnian Serb Army. NATO and UNPROFOR were increasingly difficult to separate by autumn 1995, both in terms of policy and actions taken on the ground.

In retaliation for the NATO bombings, the Serbs proceeded to retrieve their confiscated heavy weapons from the UN-controlled concentration points by force. The peace-keepers, massively outnumbered, were forced to surrender after brief, symbolic firefights. In several instances, Blue Helmets were surrounded in weapon storage areas by numerically superior Serbian forces. General Hervé Gobillard, commanding officer for UN troops in Sarajevo, stated that the peacekeepers were "merely limited in their movements, yet [had] arms, ammunition, food for many days, and strict orders to defend their positions", but in the light of the hostage-takings, concerns were raised and the UN-led bombing stopped. Also, Serbian retaliations against civilians stemming from the bombings caused 70 dead and 150 wounded in Tuzla, and 5 dead in Goražde.

Later, on a winter day, British UN troops carrying sidearms were confronted by General Mladić skiing down the piste at Sarajevo's former Olympic skiing resort but made no move for their weapons. Mladić was accompanied by four bodyguards. Despite an active warrant for his arrest issued by the Hague, they decided to carry on skiing. NATO later sent commandos to arrest suspected war criminals, but Mladić went underground. No amount of NATO action or UN demands, or even a $5 million bounty announced by Washington, resulted in his apprehension. However, in May 2011, Mladić was finally arrested and sent to the ICTY.

=== Operation Storm and Dayton Agreement ===
The above actions and operations by Croat Forces in Krajina during Operation Storm in August 1995 altered the political geography of BiH. Collectively, these ultimately led to the Dayton Agreement and the deployment of the NATO-led IFOR on 20 December 1995 to ensure the adherence of the Former Warring Factions (FWF) to the Military Annexes of The General Framework Agreement for Peace in Bosnia and Herzegovina. Some of the UNPROFOR troops were folded into the new IFOR forces, but for all intents and purposes, UNPROFOR no longer operated in Bosnia and Herzegovina.

== Perception in participating countries ==
External videos
- Pakistan army operations in Croatia for peace (English)

The situation of the field was complex, due to the fact that there were three warring parties, and numerous paramilitary units, responsible for most of the atrocities. These elements were outside of the regular chain of command. Most of the parties used ambiguous tactics to mask their culpability. Their actions included, but were not limited to:

- The Bosnian Serbs, as part of their "ethnic cleansing", would heavily shell villages while alleging their good faith.
- General Mladić had ordered the shelling of a sector near the Sarajevo airport, while he was on official visit, on the express purposes of appearing heroic in front of the French Blue helmets and to cast doubts as to who was responsible for the bombardment.
- The Bosnian party would take advantage of Safe Areas in order to storm Serb positions or villages.
- In numerous occasions, small groups of one of the warring parties would advance themselves between enemy positions and UN positions, opening fire on UN forces in the hopes of triggering a response from the UN troops.
- In the event of the Srebrenica massacre, which triggered a number of investigations to determine why UN forces failed to deter Serbian forces from storming the town, accusations have been made, notably by General Morillon, that the Serbs actually fell in a propaganda trap used by the Bosnians to reinforce their image of victims and blur their use of Safe Areas as bases. Morillon thought the Serbs' hatred of the population of Srebrenica had been largely underestimated by all parties, and the massacre could be explained as a loss of control of the Serbian hierarchy over some of its troops. Morillon's speculations about "loss of control" were rendered irrelevant by the verdicts of genocide handed down by the International Criminal Tribunal for the Former Yugoslavia.

Furthermore, the ethnic cleansing of Bosnian civilians by Serbian forces, in an effort to change the demographics, had begun at the start of the war in 1992, in eastern Bosnia.

A great deal of resentment and frustration arose in the participating countries, especially in those whose troops had been in contact with the most dramatic situations, for instance (and not exclusively):

- The involvement of the British battalion, especially concerning the Ahmići massacre, inspired the TV series Warriors by the BBC.
- The involvement of the Dutch battalion (DutchBat) in Srebrenica inspired The Enclave.
- The involvement of the Canadian battalion (CanBat) in Krajina inspired the film The Peacekeepers.
- The general situation in Sarajevo inspired the 1995 comic Sarajevo Tango, by Hermann.
- The attack against French Blue Helmets by Serb forces disguised as French U.N. troops on the bridge of Vrbanja.
- Bosnian Serb forces, in the process of retrieving their heavy weapons from UN-controlled collection points by force, took UN peacekeeping personnel hostage.
- Particularly dramatic and sensational episodes, such as the "Sarajevo's Romeo and Juliet", inevitable in any conflict, but abundantly mediatised. The "Sarajevo's Romeo and Juliet" incident inspired the documentary Romeo and Juliet in Sarajevo.
- In French, the word "sniper" entered common vocabulary after the phrase "Sniper Alley" became famous. It supplanted the usual words tireur d'élite, tireur embusqué or franc-tireur.

== See also ==
- IFOR
- SFOR
- Kosovo Force
- EUFOR Althea
