= United Nations Security Council Resolution 713 =

UN Security Council Resolution 713
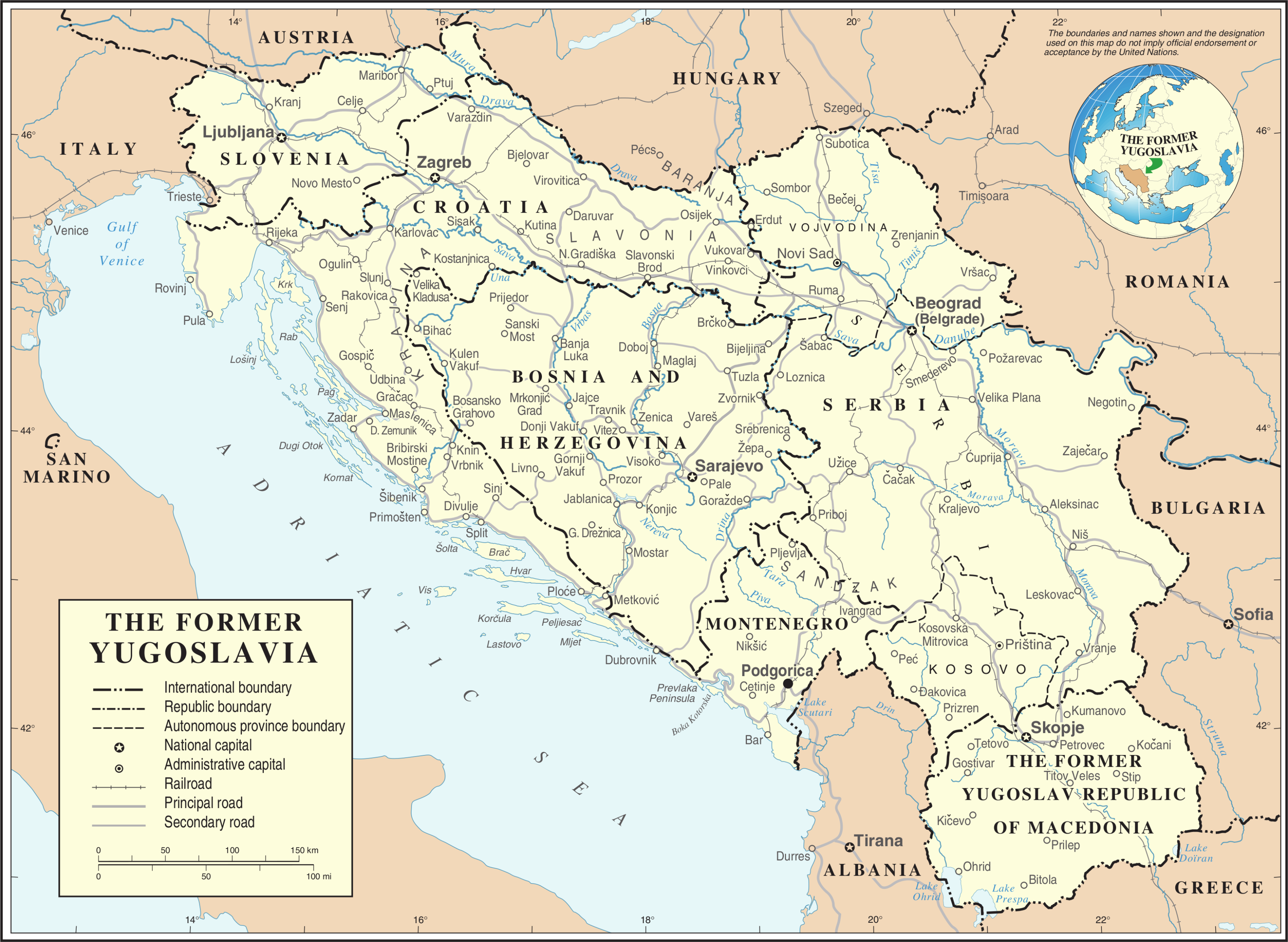
- Yugoslavia
- Date: 25 September 1991
- Meeting no.: 3,009
- Code: S/RES/713 (Document)
- Subject: Socialist Federal Republic of Yugoslavia
- Voting summary: 15 voted for; None voted against; None abstained
- Result: Adopted

Security Council composition
- Permanent members: China; France; Soviet Union; United Kingdom; United States
- Non-permanent members: Austria; Belgium; Côte d'Ivoire; Cuba; Ecuador; India; Romania; Yemen; Zaire; Zimbabwe

United Nations Security Council resolution 713, adopted unanimously on 25 September 1991, after receiving representations from a number of Member States and commending the efforts of the European Community in the region, the Council decided to impose, under Chapter VII, an arms embargo on the Socialist Federal Republic of Yugoslavia, in light of the outbreak of fighting in the country. Resolution 713 was the first resolution that concerned the breakup of Yugoslavia.

In the resolution, the Council expressed its full support of the arrangements and measures undertaken by the European Community and the Conference on Security and Cooperation in Europe to consolidate an end to the hostilities in Yugoslavia, inviting the Secretary-General Javier Pérez de Cuéllar, in consultation with the Yugoslavian government, to assist in the process. It also urged all parties concerned to strongly observe the ceasefire agreements of September 1991 and enter into negotiations at the Conference on Yugoslavia and avoid committing any actions that may increase tension in the region.

Noting the continued hostilities, the resolution also implemented an embargo on all deliveries of weapons and military equipment to Yugoslavia until the Council decided otherwise, passing this aspect of the resolution under Chapter VII as it deemed the situation to be a threat to international peace and security. Also, since Yugoslav People's Army was under control from capital Belgrade it is by some considered that other Yugoslav countries were put in inferior position since the warfare continued. The resolution would apply to all the constituent states that made up Yugoslavia, even on their independence; however, Bosnia and Herzegovina contested the ruling by stating it only applied to Yugoslavia when it existed, and therefore after the independence of constituent countries it no longer had effect.

== See also ==
- Bosnian War
- Croatian War of Independence
- John Major
- Douglas Hurd
- List of United Nations Security Council Resolutions 701 to 800 (1991–1993)
- Slovenian Independence War
- Yugoslav Wars
- Brendan Simms
- List of United Nations Security Council Resolutions related to the conflicts in former Yugoslavia
