= 1991 riot in Zadar =

1991 riot in Croatia against the Yugoslav government

- Part of the Croatian War of Independence
- Location map of Zadar in Croatia
- Date: 2 May 1991
- Location: Zadar, Croatia; 44.116677°N 15.235236°E
- Caused by: Murder of Croatian police officer Franko Lisica near Polača and Borovo Selo incident, both committed by ethnic Serbs
- Methods: Street protest
- Result: A number of Serbs fled from Zadar

The 1991 riot in Zadar was an act of violence that took place in the Croatian city of Zadar on 2 May 1991. Following an incident in the Zadar hinterland in which a Croatian policeman was killed, reportedly by SAO Krajina militiamen, Croatian civilians vandalized, destroyed and looted properties belonging to ethnic Serbs and Yugoslav companies in the city.

== Background ==
Tensions between Croats and Serbs increased steadily through 1990 and 1991 following the electoral victory of Croatia's nationalist Croatian Democratic Union party, led by Franjo Tuđman. Many Serbs were deeply unhappy about the prospect of living as a minority in an independent Croatia. In the summer of 1990, they took up arms in the largely Serb-populated regions of inland Dalmatia, calling the breakaway region "SAO Krajina", sealing roads and effectively blocking Dalmatia from the rest of Croatia. The insurrection spread to the eastern region of Slavonia in early 1991, when paramilitary groups from Serbia itself took up positions in the region and started to expel non-Serbs from the area, reportedly associated with the Serbian Radical Party.

On 28 April 1991, JNA imposed a blockade of the village of Kijevo. The village was surrounded by the JNA, commanded by Colonel Ratko Mladić, and the Serb insurgent forces, cutting access and preventing delivery of supplies. It was one of the first instances where the JNA openly sided with the insurgent Serbs in the rapidly escalating Croatian War of Independence.

On 2 May, paramilitaries killed twelve Croatian policemen in Borovo Selo and reportedly mutilated some or all of the bodies. This was, at the time, the bloodiest single incident in the Croatian conflict, and it caused widespread shock and outrage in Croatia. The killings produced an immediate upsurge in ethnic tensions.

== Riot ==
On 2 May, a 23-year-old Croatian policeman, Franko Lisica, was killed near Polača in northern Dalmatia. The police attributed his death to close range enemy weapons fire, presumably by Krajina Serb militiamen.

Later the same day, on 2 May 1991, a group of people entered Zadar from its southeastern suburb of Gaženica, starting a riot whose apparent aim was to destroy and loot properties belonging either to ethnic Serbs or to Yugoslav companies such as JAT.

The rioting started in the afternoon and lasted for hours, while the damaged properties were still being looted by individuals the following day. Đuro Kresović, at the time the head of the Criminal department of the Municipal Court of Zadar, witnessed the effects of the riot on 3 May and assessed the number of demolished properties at over 130, given that an insurance company made a list of 136 destroyed properties.

As there were so many broken windows in the city centre streets, the next day Narodni list, a Zadar newspaper, published the headline Zadarska noć kristala (roughly translated as "Zadar's night of [broken] glass", and the incident was later referred to by some sources as the kristalna noć (or Kristallnacht) of Zadar. The Croatian police response was inadequate, while the insurance company Croatia osiguranje agreed to compensate the Serb business owners for the riot damage.

Đuro Kresović claimed the police station in Zadar and many of its uniformed officers were actively involved in the lead-up to the riot and the rioting itself.

== Aftermath ==
Immediately afterwards, anti-Croat rioting took place in the Krajina. On the night of the 6th/7th of May 1991 in Knin, in retaliation for the events in Zadar, the property of Croats, Albanians and Croatian companies was attacked and looted. The militia could not control the "rampant crowd" and requested the help of the JNA, which did not intervene. The army had information that the bombings and robbery were carried out by people connected to the militia in Knin. On May 8, property belonging to Croats was attacked in Obrovac, which prompted their departure. By the end of May 1991, entire families fled to Zadar from Knin, Benkovac and Obrovac and the surrounding villages.

A separate protest at the naval headquarters in Split happened on 6 May against the Yugoslav People's Army. The protesters demanded an end to the siege of Kijevo. At the protest one Yugoslav Army soldier was killed by a gunshot reportedly fired from the crowd and another was wounded by protestors. Four organisers of the protest were arrested a month later by the JNA, tried in a military court and convicted.

In July, JNA and Serb forces launched the attack on Croatian-populated Dalmatia, starting the battle of Zadar, in which there were 34 casualties. In September the 1991 Yugoslav campaign in Croatia also led to land and naval battles in the Zadar area.

In 1995, the government of FR Yugoslavia made a report that claimed the number of properties destroyed to have been at least 168, and it accused local HDZ officials of having instigated the violence. It claimed that the riot was "organized by a number of the HDZ activists and the highest-ranking officials in Zadar, in the presence of highest-ranking HDZ officials Vladimir Šeks, deputy Speaker of the Croatian Parliament, and Petar Šale".

Đuro Kresović was demoted and afterwards discharged from his position at the Municipal Court. He claims that the riot caused most of the Serb population of the city of Zadar to flee in fear for their lives, that some were later harassed and tortured, and that around a dozen people were subsequently killed. During the war Kresović worked as a judge in at the time Serb-occupied towns of Knin and Beli Manastir. Croatian newspapers published transcripts that implicated Đuro Kresović in the cover-up of the October 1991 Široka Kula massacre when he was the president of the Knin District Court.

The State Attorney's Office in Split had an open case regarding the riot but it was closed with no charges filed in 2002.
