= Battle of Dalmatia =

Battle of Dalmatia may apply to the following battles:

- Battle of the Dalmatian Coast
- Battle of Zadar
- Battle of Šibenik
- Siege of Dubrovnik
- Battle of the Dalmatian channels
