= 1991 protest in Split =

Street protest against the Yugoslav People's Army

- Part of the Croatian War of Independence
- Location map of Split in Croatia
- Date: 6 May 1991
- Location: Split, Croatia; 43.503511°N 16.428529°E
- Caused by: Yugoslav People's Army blockade of Kijevo
- Goals: Lifting of the blockade
- Methods: Street protest
- Result: No direct results

Parties
Croatian Trade Union Association	Yugoslavia

Number
100,000	Unknown

Casualties and losses
None	1 killed Several wounded

A street protest against the Yugoslav People's Army (Jugoslovenska Narodna Armija – JNA) was held in Split, Croatia, on 6 May 1991. The protest was organised by the Croatian Trade Union Association in the Brodosplit Shipyard and joined in by workers from other companies in the city and other residents of Split after radio broadcast appeals for help while the protesters marched through the streets. Ultimately, the protest drew 100,000 supporters.

The march ended in a picket in front of the Banovina building, where the JNA had its headquarters in Split at the time. The protesters demanded an end to the JNA-imposed blockade of the village of Kijevo. Scuffles broke out in front of the building, and a JNA soldier was killed by a gunshot reportedly fired from the crowd. Four organisers of the protest were arrested a month later by the JNA, tried in a military court and convicted. They were released months later in a prisoner exchange. The protest caused the JNA to withdraw a portion of military equipment previously based in Split to more secure locations and increase its combat readiness there. The blockade of Kijevo was lifted through negotiations days after the protest.

== Background ==
In 1990, following the electoral defeat of the government of the Socialist Republic of Croatia, ethnic tensions worsened. The Yugoslav People's Army (Jugoslovenska Narodna Armija – JNA) then confiscated the weapons of Croatia's Territorial Defence (Teritorijalna obrana) in order to minimize resistance. On 17 August, tensions escalated into an open revolt of the Croatian Serbs, centred on the predominantly Serb-populated areas of the Dalmatian hinterland around Knin, parts of the Lika, Kordun, Banovina and eastern Croatia. After two unsuccessful attempts by Serbia, supported by Montenegro and Serbia's provinces of Vojvodina and Kosovo to obtain the Yugoslav Presidency's approval to deploy the JNA to disarm Croatian security forces in January 1991, and a bloodless skirmish between Serb insurgents and Croatian special police in March, the JNA itself, supported by Serbia and its allies, asked the federal Presidency to grant it wartime powers and declare a state of emergency. The request was denied on 15 March, and the JNA came under the control of Serbian President Slobodan Milošević. Milošević, preferring a campaign to expand Serbia rather than the preservation of Yugoslavia, publicly threatened to replace the JNA with a Serbian army and declared that he no longer recognized the authority of the federal Presidency. The threat caused the JNA to gradually abandon plans to preserve Yugoslavia in favour of expanding Serbia. By the end of the month, the conflict had escalated to its first fatalities. The JNA intervened on the side of the insurgents, and prevented the Croatian police from taking action. In early April, the leaders of the Serb revolt in Croatia declared their intent to integrate the area under their control, viewed by the Government of Croatia as a breakaway region, with Serbia.

In the beginning of 1991, Croatia had no regular army. In an effort to bolster its defences, it doubled police personnel to about 20,000. The most effective part of the force was the 3,000-strong special police. The Croatian view of the JNA's role in the Serb revolt gradually evolved from January 1991. The initial plan of Croatian President Franjo Tuđman was to win support from the European Community (EC) and the United States for Croatia, and he disregarded advice to seize JNA barracks and storage facilities in the country. Tuđman's stance was motivated by his belief that Croatia could not win a war against the JNA.

== Protest ==
The immediate cause for a confrontation with the JNA in Split was a blockade of the village of Kijevo, where Croatian authorities had established a new police station, imposed on 29 April. The village was surrounded by the JNA, commanded by Colonel Ratko Mladić, and the Serb insurgent forces, cutting access and preventing delivery of supplies. Tuđman called on the public to bring the siege to its end.

The protest took place on 6 May 1991 in Split, organised by the Croatian Trade Union Association in Brodosplit Shipyard, in response to Tuđman's earlier statement. The protest started out with 10,000 shipyard workers, but ultimately drew approximately 100,000 people, from the shipyard and other factories in Split to a protest march through the city, carrying Croatian flags. The protest march grew in number as more citizens joined in, following radio broadcast messages calling for support. In order to prevent the Yugoslav Navy from intervening using ships equipped with water cannons, Jadrolinija ships were used to obstruct access to the port. The protesters picketed around the Banovina building, which housed the command centres of the JNA Military-Maritime District and the Yugoslav Navy at the time. The protesters demanded lifting of the blockade of Kijevo, withdrawal of armoured personnel carriers parked in front of the Banovina building and hoisting of a Croatian flag on the building itself.

During the protest, the crowd assaulted a JNA armoured personnel carrier and managed to remove a machine gun mounted on the vehicle, while one of the protesters, Ivica Balić, hoisted a Croatian flag at the building to singing of the Croatian anthem by the crowd. In a scuffle which broke out in front of the building, Saško Gešovski, a JNA conscript from Macedonia, was killed by a shot fired from the crowd. By the end of the afternoon, the crowd removed the Yugoslav flag from the building, moved away and dispersed.

== Aftermath ==
Besides Gešovski, there were no fatalities, but several JNA soldiers were wounded. Gešovski's death sparked demonstrations in the Macedonian capital, Skopje, in June. Protesters accused Tuđman of being responsible for the murder. The Croatian Government refused to express regret for Gešovski's killing, and the Serbian media pointed to the young Macedonian's death as proof that Tuđman's government had revived the fascist Ustaše, which controlled Croatia during World War II.

Then-mayor of Split Onesin Cvitan claimed that Gešovski was fired upon from the Banovina building. However, the Croatian State Attorney's Office contradicted him, claiming that Gešovski was killed by someone in the crowd picketing in front of the building. An investigation was launched but the case was dropped because of lack of evidence. The JNA's security service in Split, run by Colonel Ljubiša Beara, identified Mato Sabljić, Ivan Begonja, Roland Zvonarić and Branko Glavinović as organisers of the protest where the killing occurred and arrested them on 5 June. They were put on trial at a military court in Sarajevo on 19 August, convicted and sentenced to one and a half to eight years in prison. The group was imprisoned in Foča until 25 November, when they were exchanged for JNA prisoners of war. The protest is commemorated annually in Split and a monograph covering the event was issued in 2011.

In the wake of the protest, the JNA increased combat readiness of its garrison in Split and elsewhere in Dalmatia and withdrew a part of artillery and personnel from Split to its bases located away from the coast. Furthermore, the Military-Maritime District of the JNA ordered its garrisons to stock up potable water and prepare power generators for use if the supply of electricity were cut. The JNA evacuated itself from Split by 4 January 1992, pursuant to agreements ending the Battle of the Barracks.

The siege of Kijevo was lifted days after the protest through negotiations and two weeks after the JNA blockaded the village. However, the arrangement proved short-lived as JNA units, again led by Mladić, attacked Kijevo and destroyed a substantial part of the village. The attack began when Croatian forces refused to surrender to Croatian Serb leader Milan Martić. It was one of the first instances where the JNA openly sided with the insurgent Serbs in the rapidly escalating Croatian War of Independence.
