= Zadar (disambiguation) =

Zadar may refer to:

- Zadar, a city in Croatia
- Zadar County, Croatia
- Zadar Airport, Croatia
- KK Zadar, a basketball team
- Zadar! Cow from Hell, a film

== See also ==
- Siege of Zadar (disambiguation)
- Bombing of Zadar in World War II
