= Banovina Palace (Split) =

- Banovina
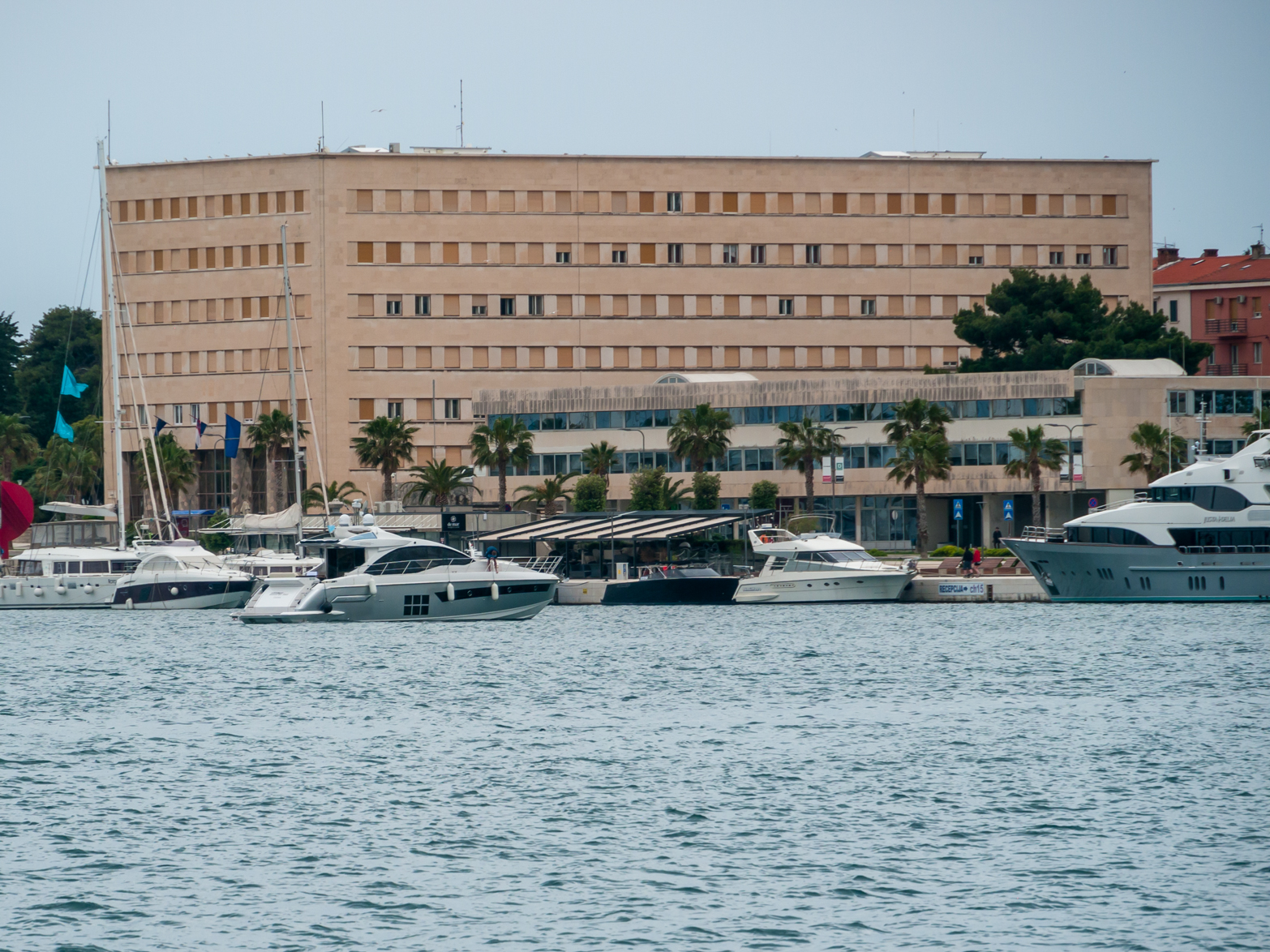
- Interactive map of the Banovina Palace area

General information
- Architectural style: Modernist; Art Deco; Stripped Classicism
- Location: Split, Croatia
- Coordinates: 43°30′12.5″N 16°25′42″E
- Year built: 1936–1940
- Construction started: 1940; 86 years ago
- Completed: 1940; 86 years ago
- Owner: City of Split

The Banovina Palace (Croatian: Banovina, Palača Banovine) in Split, Croatia is a representative building housing the city administration (Croatian: gradska uprava). The building was completed in 1940 as the seat of the Littoral Banovina.

== History ==
=== Kingdom of Yugoslavia ===
After Zadar was annexed by the Kingdom of Italy, Split rose in importance within the newly established Kingdom of Yugoslavia and was designated the new administrative centre of Dalmatia with the creation of the Littoral Banovina in 1929. This shift was not welcomed by other Dalmatian cities, particularly Dubrovnik and Šibenik, which viewed Split's new status with disapproval.

Initially, authorities planned to locate the administrative building of the new banovina near the Diocletian Palace on the site of the old lazarettos. Prvislav Grisogono’s 1936 article in the Belgrade daily Politika criticizes plans to construct a new administrative building directly in front of Diocletian Palace, arguing that such a project would permanently damage the historical and aesthetic value of the ancient site. By appealing to national rather than merely local interests, Grizogono positions the preservation of cultural heritage as a matter of public concern and state responsibility. Before launching a formal competition, authorities consulted the renowned Slovenian architect Jože Plečnik, who proposed a comprehensive redesign of the Stara obala. His plan included a widened Francuska obala with a new hotel, a smaller hotel to replace the existing Harbour Master’s Office, and the Banovina Palace building to the east of these.

In 1930, a public architectural competition for the Banovina Palace was held but failed to yield a satisfactory result. Around the same time, a proposal by sculptor Ivan Meštrović and architect Drago Ibler was submitted but was ultimately rejected as well. Interest in the project revived in 1934, with new plans placing the building next to the Maritime Traffic Directorate on Mletačka obala. In 1935, an urban planning study was developed by engineer Petar Senjanović and architect Josip Pićman, inspired by an idea from Josip Smodlaka. This plan proposed a more central location in the Pazar district, east of Diocletian’s Palace, and envisioned a national monument and a large square in front of the building. Despite receiving praise in professional circles, this proposal was never implemented. In discussing the urban plan of Split Fabjan Kaliterna emphasized the importance of the old city port and its coastline as the face of the city for those arriving by sea. He underlined how the new Banovina Palace sets a precedent for further coastal development toward the east. He proposed that instead of building it in standard blocks the city should develop the coast in a meander form.

A definitive decision came in 1936, when authorities opted to construct the Banovina Palace on a completely new site—the Zapadna obala. A regulation plan for this area was developed and approved between 1937 and 1938, calling for multi-story development and placing the future Banovina Palace as a landmark at the southernmost point. The building was finally completed in 1940 on the Western Coast, rather than in any of the originally proposed central locations.

=== Socialist Yugoslavia ===
Banovina Palace was damaged during World War II during the Allied bombing of Yugoslavia in World War II between 1943 and 1944. The building was reconstructed in the immediate aftermath of the war.

=== 1991 Protests and Commemorations ===
On May 6, 1991, a protest took place in front of the Banovina building, which had housed the Yugoslav Navy Command at the time. It was organized by Jure Šundov, head of the Brodosplit union, and supported by workers from major city enterprises like Brodosplit, Jugoplastika and others. The protest was a response to the Yugoslav People's Army’s entrance into the Croatian village of Kijevo and the blockade of the hospital in Vrlika. Protesters demanded the lifting of the siege and the raising of the Croatian flag on the Banovina building. During the protest, Ivica Balić removed the flag of Yugoslavia and raised the flag of Croatia, which some participants view symbolically as the start of the Croatian War of Independence.

A Macedonian soldier Sašo Gešovski was killed and two people were injured in the violence at the protest. A violent incident occurred at the 2019 commemoration of the event when a group of activists raised a banner stating “Sašo Gešovski, innocent victim of war criminals Sloba and Franjo”, referring to Slobodan Milošević and Franjo Tuđman. This angered some attendees, one of whom physically attacked the activists. At the 2023 commemoration of the 1991 protest, President of Croatia Zoran Milanović said that the protesters had gathered in front of the Banovina to demand justice, not to incite violence. He acknowledged that one person lost their life that day and emphasized that this should always be remembered.

City authorities of Split announced in 2024 a memorial plaque at the Banovina building will be installed to commemorate Saško Gešovski. The decision was made by the City Commission for Naming Streets and Squares, with expected approval by the City Council. The plaque's wording sparked debate, especially the original proposal calling him a "victim of the protest", which some feared could be misinterpreted. Right-wing groups opposed the bilingual inscription and the plaque’s placement on the Banovina building, preferring a park instead.

=== Subsequent events ===
On September 20, 2010, a group of first-year film students staged a silent performance in front of the Banovina building in Split, covering their eyes with neckties to symbolize political indifference toward youth issues. The event took a dramatic turn when Deputy Mayor Jure Šundov attacked a student cameraman and destroyed part of his camera.

== See also ==
- Banski Dvori
- Gallery of Fine Arts, Split
- Ivan Meštrović Gallery
