= Siege of Zadar (disambiguation) =

The Siege of Zadar in 1202 was the first major action of the Fourth Crusade and the first attack against a Catholic city by Catholic crusaders.

Siege of Zadar may also refer to:

- Siege of Zadar (998), a military conflict during the third Croatian–Bulgarian war resulting in a Croatian victory
- Siege of Zadar (1345–1346), a successful attempt by the Republic of Venice to capture Zadar
- Siege of Zadar (1813), a conflict during the Napoleonic Wars resulting in the surrender of a French garrison

== See also ==
- Battle of Zadar (1991)
- Bombing of Zadar in World War II
- 1991 riot in Zadar
