= Battle of Šibenik =

Battle of the Croatian War of Independence

Coordinates: 43.73°N 15.89°E

- Part of the Croatian War of Independence
- Šibenik on the map of Croatia. JNA-held area in late December 1991 are highlighted red.
Date	16 September – 22 September 1991 (6 days)
Location	Northern Dalmatia, Croatia
Result	Croatian victory

Belligerents
Yugoslavia; SAO Krajina	Croatia

Commanders and leaders
Ratko Mladić; Mile Kandić; Vladimir Vuković; Borislav Đukić	Anton Tus; Rahim Ademi; Milivoj Petković; Luka Vujić; Josip Juras

Units involved
Yugoslav People's Army; Yugoslav Ground Forces; 221st Mechanised Brigade; 46th Partisan Division; 9th Mixed Artillery Regiment; Yugoslav Navy; 11th Marine Infantry Brigade; Krajina Territorial Defense	Croatian National Guard; 4th Guards Brigade; 113th Šibenik Brigade; Croatian Police

Casualties and losses
Unknown	3 soldiers killed 49 soldiers wounded
- 7 civilians killed 64 civilians wounded

The Battle of Šibenik (Croatian: Bitka za Šibenik), also known as the September War (Rujanski rat), was an armed conflict fought between the Yugoslav People's Army (Jugoslovenska Narodna Armija – JNA), supported by the Croatian Serb-established Serbian Autonomous Oblast of Krajina (SAO Krajina), and the Croatian National Guard (Zbor Narodne Garde – ZNG), supported by the Croatian Police. The battle was fought to the north and west of the city of Šibenik, Croatia on 16–22 September 1991, during the Croatian War of Independence. The JNA's initial orders were to relieve Croatian siege of their barracks in the city and isolate the region of Dalmatia from the rest of Croatia. The JNA's advance was supported by the Yugoslav Air Force and the Yugoslav Navy.

Fighting stopped following a Croatian counter-attack that pushed the JNA back from the outskirts of Šibenik. Although some ground was lost to the Yugoslavs, especially around the town of Drniš, northeast of Šibenik, the ZNG captured several JNA and Yugoslav Navy facilities in the city, including dozens of navy vessels and several coastal artillery batteries. The captured batteries were used to support defence of the city. The JNA Šibenik garrison was evacuated following an agreement between the Croatian officials and the JNA, except for several comparably small JNA posts in the city which were captured by the ZNG.

The September–October fighting caused three Croatian military and seven civilian deaths, as well as more than a hundred wounded. JNA bombarded Šibenik, causing damage to numerous structures, including the Cathedral of St. James, a UNESCO World Heritage Site. The New York Times judged the bombardment to be a part of calculated assaults on the heritage of Croatia. Artillery bombardment of the city continued over the following 100 days.

== Background ==
In 1990, following the electoral defeat of the government of the Socialist Republic of Croatia, ethnic tensions worsened. The Yugoslav People's Army (Jugoslovenska Narodna Armija – JNA) confiscated Croatia's Territorial Defence weapons to minimise resistance. On 17 August, tensions escalated into an open revolt of the Croatian Serbs, centred on the predominantly Serb-populated areas of the Dalmatian hinterland around Knin, parts of the Lika, Kordun, Banovina and eastern Croatia, largely fueled by recollections of the Serbs of the genocide to which they had been subjected in the Independent State of Croatia during World War II, and their resultant unwillingness to be minorities in an independent Croatia.

After two unsuccessful attempts by Serbia, supported by Montenegro and Serbia's provinces of Vojvodina and Kosovo, to obtain the Yugoslav Presidency's approval of a JNA operation to disarm Croatian security forces in January 1991, and a bloodless skirmish between Serb insurgents and Croatian special police in March, the JNA itself, supported by Serbia and its allies, asked the federal Presidency to give it wartime authorities and declare a state of emergency. The request was denied on 15 March, and the JNA came under control of Serbian President Slobodan Milošević. Milošević, preferring a campaign to expand Serbia rather than preservation of Yugoslavia, publicly threatened to replace the JNA with a Serbian army and declared that he no longer recognised the authority of the federal Presidency. The threat caused the JNA to gradually abandon plans to preserve Yugoslavia in favour of expansion of Serbia. By the end of the month, the conflict had escalated to the first fatalities. The JNA stepped in, supporting the insurgents, and preventing Croatian police from intervening. In early April, leaders of the Serb revolt in Croatia declared their intention of integration of the area under their control, viewed by the Government of Croatia as a breakaway region with Serbia.

In the beginning of 1991, Croatia had no regular army. In an effort to bolster its defence, Croatia doubled police personnel to about 20,000. The most effective part of the force was 3,000 special police, deployed in twelve battalions adopting military unit organisation. In addition, there were 9,000–10,000 regionally organised reserve police. The reserve police were set up in 16 battalions and 10 companies, but the reserve force lacked weapons. In May, the Croatian Government responded by forming the Croatian National Guard (Zbor narodne garde), but its development was hampered by a United Nations arms embargo introduced in September 1991.

== Prelude ==
By late June and throughout July, northern Dalmatia saw daily armed skirmishes but no actual combat. Nonetheless, the increasing intensity of the conflict in the region and elsewhere in Croatia led to the preparation of bomb shelters in Zadar by city officials. Serbian Autonomous Oblast of Krajina (SAO Krajina) authorities called up three Territorial Defence units in the Zadar hinterland on 11 July, one day after another fatal shooting of a Croatian police patrol in the Zadar area, while the JNA 9th (Knin) Corps conscripted the local Serb population in Benkovac to strengthen its ranks by the end of the month. In late July, a paramilitary group, led by Miro Barešić and formally subordinated to the Croatian Ministry of Defence, conducted several sabotages in the Benkovac area. On 1 August, Croatia deployed two battalions of the ZNG 4th Guards Brigade to Kruševo near Obrovac. Two days later they engaged in combat against the SAO Krajina Territorial Defence and police forces, marking the first such engagement of the Croatian War of Independence in the region. On 26 August, the JNA 9th (Knin) Corps openly sided with the SAO Krajina forces as they jointly attacked Kijevo, expelling all Croats from the village. Another significant setback for Croatia in the region was JNA capture of the Maslenica Bridge on 11 September. That severed the last overland road link between Dalmatia and the rest of Croatia. On 11–13 September, an attack in the area of Skradin cut water and power supply to Šibenik.

On 14 September, the ZNG and the Croatian police blockaded and cut utilities to all JNA facilities located in Croatian-controlled territory, beginning the Battle of the Barracks. The move blockaded 33 large JNA garrisons in Croatia and numerous smaller facilities, including border posts, weapons and ammunition storage depots. The blockade forced the JNA to amend its planned campaign in Croatia to accommodate the new development. The same day, a coastal artillery battery on the Žirje Island was captured by Croatian forces, after JNA Senior Sergeant Željko Baltić, battery commanding officer, switched his allegiance. The battery consisted of twelve Ansaldo 90/53 guns which were once part of the armament of the Italian battleship Vittorio Veneto.

== Order of battle ==
Map of Šibenik–Drniš area

The JNA's planned campaign included an advance in the Šibenik area by the 9th (Knin) Corps, which was tasked with isolating Dalmatia from the rest of Croatia. As it was fully mobilised and prepared for deployment, the corps began operations against the ZNG on 16 September. Its main axis of attack was directed at Vodice, with supporting advances towards Zadar, Drniš and Sinj. The push was designed to create favourable circumstances to attack Zadar, Šibenik and Split. With support from a corps-level battalion of M-84 tanks and the SAO Krajina Territorial Defence, the JNA 221st Mechanised Brigade (without its battalion of T-34 tanks), was committed to the main axis of the attack. The secondary advance, towards Biograd na Moru on the right flank, was assigned to the 180th Mechanised Brigade, supported by the armoured battalion removed from the 221st Brigade, the 557th Mixed Antitank Artillery Regiment and the SAO Krajina Territorial Defence. Offensive support was provided by the 9th Mixed Artillery Regiment and the 9th Military Police Battalion. The 221st Brigade was commanded by Colonel Borislav Đukić. Elements the 46th Partisan Division, drawn from the 24th (Kragujevac) Corps, also provided support for the corps. The JNA garrison in Šibenik barracks included the 11th Marine Infantry Brigade—one of a handful of units regularly maintained at full combat readiness.

In opposition to the JNA, the ZNG 113th Infantry Brigade, commanded by Milivoj Petković, defended the city of Šibenik together with police forces, under overall control of the Šibenik crisis centre headed by Josip Juras. The 4th Battalion of the 113th Infantry Brigade, commanded by Josip Jukica, as well as the 4th Battalion of the 4th Guards Brigade, commanded by Ivan Zelić, defended the Drniš area, 25 kilometres (16 miles) northeast of Šibenik, supported by a company of police. The 600-strong 4th Battalion of the 4th Guards Brigade represented the strongest ZNG unit in the area, while the JNA is estimated by Croatian sources to have deployed approximately 1,500 troops against Drniš. On 20 September, all Croatian combat troops in Drniš area were subordinated to Luka Vujić. The western bank of the Krka River and approaches to Vodice were controlled by the 3rd Battalion of the 113th Infantry Brigade. While small arms were sufficient to arm a part of the battalion at a time, the battalion did not have any heavy weapons.

== Timeline ==
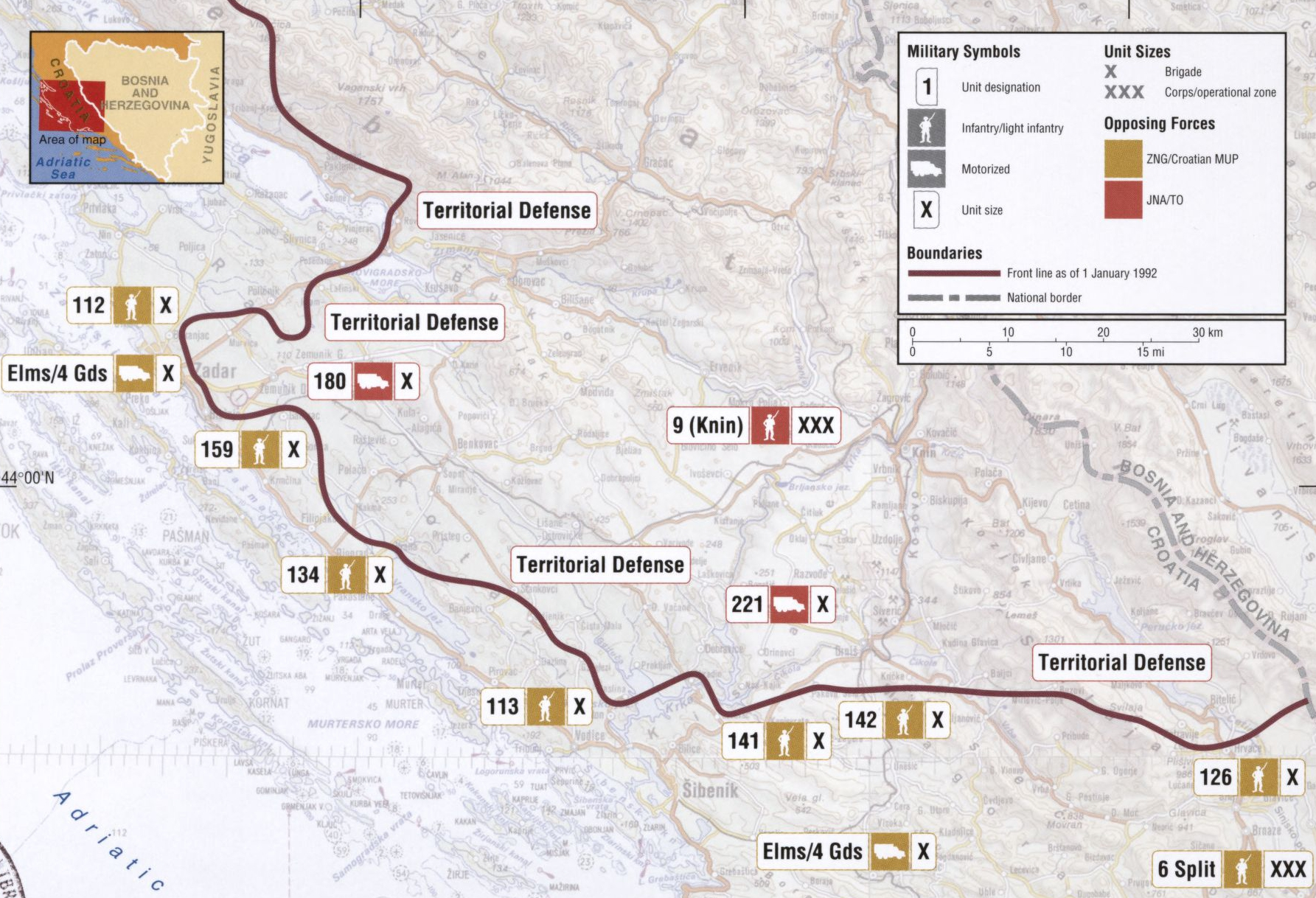
Situation in the northern Dalmatia, January 1992

The offensive commenced at 16:00 (local time) on 16 September. On the left flank, the JNA advanced towards Drniš, capturing the villages of Maljkovo and Kričke, and interdicting the Drniš–Split, east of the Krka River. On the opposite river bank, the JNA advanced towards Vodice and Šibenik, threatening the city from the west, reaching the western side of the 390-metre (1,280 ft) Šibenik Bridge on the Adriatic Highway. The advance was so rapid it cut off the 1st Company of the 3rd Battalion of the ZNG 113th Infantry Brigade from the rest of the ZNG force. That day, the ZNG captured a 100-millimetre (3.9 in) coastal artillery battery near village of Zečevo. By 17 September, the commanding officer of the JNA 9th (Knin) Corps, Major General Vladimir Vuković, modified the initial deployment plan, because of strong resistance offered by the ZNG and the Croatian police, relying on populated areas and terrain features to hold back the JNA forces north of Vodice. The changes involved diverting a part of the force to attack Drniš and Sinj directly, while the remainder of the attacking force rested. The Yugoslav Navy started a blockade of Šibenik and the entire Croatian Adriatic coast.

On the night of 17/18 September, the JNA was ordered to trap and destroy the ZNG force in Drniš and the Miljevci Plateau area, while holding positions achieved elsewhere. In the morning, the JNA resumed its offensive towards Vodice, on the right flank of the attack, while the ZNG abandoned Drniš and pulled back to the village of Unešić. On 19 September, the ZNG captured an 88-millimetre (3.5 in) JNA coastal artillery battery on the Smokvica Island and the "Krušćica" barracks near Rogoznica. Weapons retrieved from the captured barracks, a shipment received from Gospić following the capture of JNA facilities in the town, as well as use of the captured artillery pieces, significantly improved ZNG's capabilities. The JNA advance south from Drniš was effectively halted that day, following three successful ambushes by the ZNG in Unešić, Pakovo Selo and south of Žitnić.

The JNA orders were changed again on 20 September, when the JNA 9th (Knin) Corps orders were supplanted by the Military-Maritime District order, issued by Vice Admiral Mile Kandić, for the corps to reorient the JNA force north of Vodice towards Šibenik and Split. This required crossing the Šibenik Bridge spanning the Krka River ria. The eastward advance—with close air support from the Yugoslav Air Force—failed, and cost the air force four aircraft shot down by the ZNG. On 22 September, a Croatian counter-attack, supported by recently acquired artillery, pushed back the JNA from the bridge by 10:00, extending the ZNG-controlled bridgehead to the area of Gaćelezi, 9 kilometres (5.6 miles) to the northwest. Four guns of the Žirje battery were used as anti-tank guns in support of the counter-attack.

On 22 September, the Croatian forces captured the JNA "Kuline" barracks in Šibenik itself along with the 15 Yugoslav Navy vessels based there. According to the Federal Secretary of National Defense, Croatian forces used tear gas during the assault on the naval facilities. In addition, 19 vessels undergoing various stages of overhaul were captured in the "Velimir Škorpik" shipyard. The ships, comprising approximately a quarter of the Yugoslav naval assets, included: Vlado Ćetković (RTOP-402) Končar-class fast attack craft (renamed Šibenik (RTOP-21) later on), Velimir Škorpik (RČ-310) Osa-class missile boat, Partizan II (TČ-222) Shershen-class torpedo boat and Biokovo (PČ-171), Cer (PČ-180) and Durmitor (PČ-181) Mirna-class patrol boats.

On 23 September, the JNA fully secured Drniš and its surroundings. At the same time, it shifted its focus to the Battle of Zadar, away from Šibenik. The Yugoslav naval blockade was lifted unilaterally the same day. Even though a number of JNA facilities in the city were captured by the ZNG, several major JNA posts remained in Šibenik. Those included "Rade Končar" barracks housing the 11th Marine Infantry Brigade, "Ante Jonić" barracks, "Minerska" depot where naval mines were stored, "Jamnjak" depot and the "Ražine" artillery battery containing confiscated Croatian Territorial Defence weapons and "Duboka" fuel storage. The "Duboka" depot consisted of three 1,410,000-litre (310,000 imp gal; 370,000 US gal) storage tanks.

== Aftermath ==
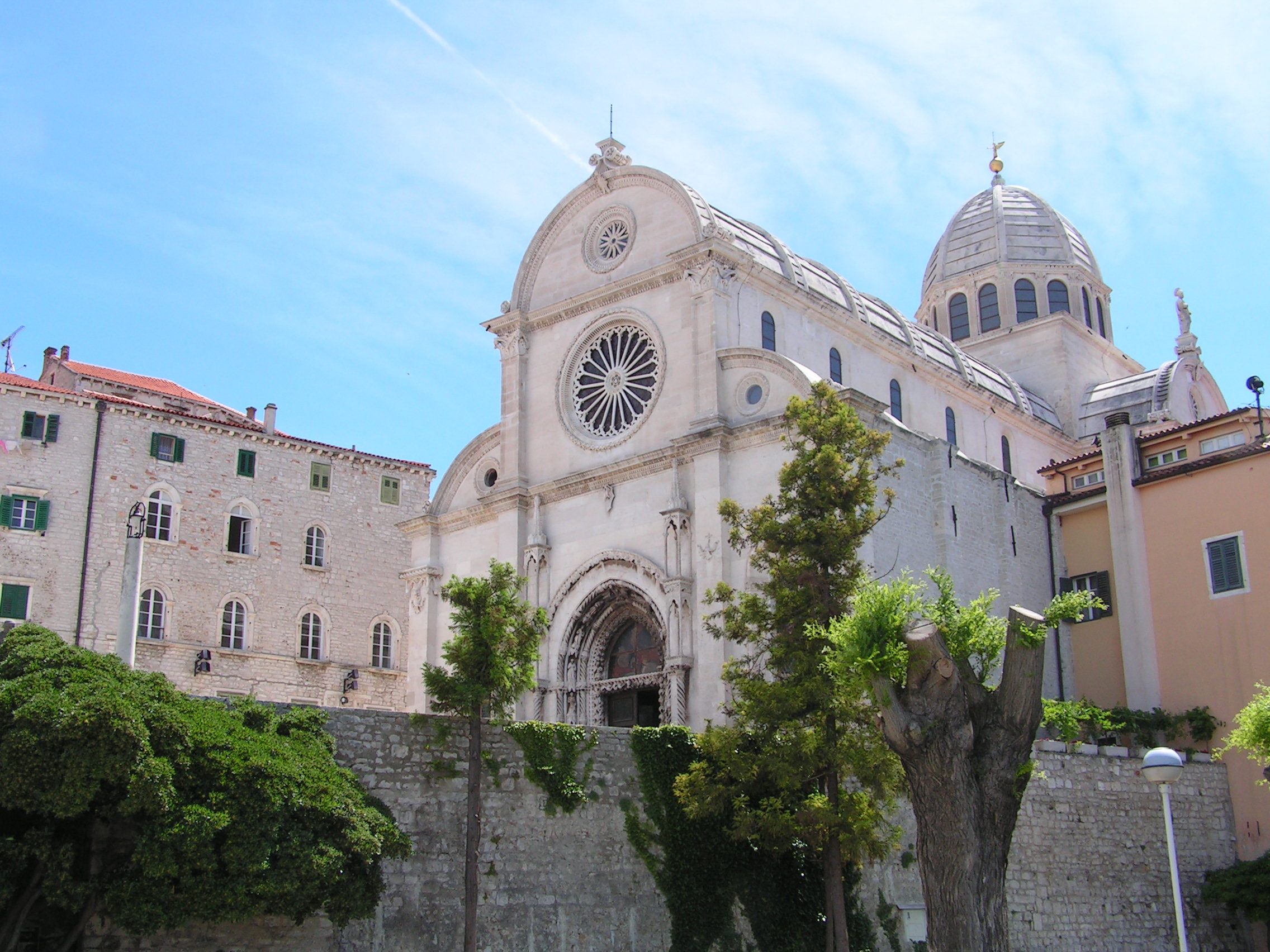
Cathedral of St. James in Šibenik sustained artillery damage in September 1991

The JNA was defeated in the battle, subsequently nicknamed the "September War" (Rujanski rat). Its total losses in the battle were not reported. The ZNG and the Croatian police sustained losses of three killed and 49 wounded troops in the battle. At the same time seven civilians were killed and 64 wounded. JNA artillery continued intermittent shelling of Šibenik over the following 100 days resulting in further casualties and damage. Heavy bombardment from land and warships of the naval base damaged several buildings within Šibenik's old city, including the Cathedral of St. James, a UNESCO World Heritage Site, the city walls within the area of the Šibenik City Museum, St. Lucia Monastery and the steeple of St. Frances Church. An editorial in The New York Times labeled bombardment of the cathedral as a part of the "calculated assaults" on treasures of Croatia. During the fighting, electrical substations in Bilice and Konjsko were destroyed, disrupting electric power distribution in Dalmatia.

Evacuation of the JNA facilities and surrender of the confiscated Territorial Defence weapons stored in the Šibenik–Split area was agreed on 21 November. Throughout the process, tensions remained high, and the JNA made contingency plans to break through from Knin to Šibenik and Split to relieve the siege of its forces there—codenamed Operation Coast-91 (Operacija Obala-91) and Operation Hurricane-91 (Operacija Orkan-91) respectively. All of the JNA facilities in Šibenik, along with the confiscated Territorial Defence weapons, were handed over to the Croatian authorities by 10 December.

News coverage of the battle produced television footage of ZNG air defence artillery at Zečevo firing at a Yugoslav Air Force Soko J-21 Jastreb and scoring a hit on another J-21 using a guided missile. The footage, ending in shouts claiming that both of the planes were downed, became one of the most significant pieces of material in terms of propaganda and morale in Croatia. Nonetheless, the footage proved controversial, since the first plane is not shown falling to the ground or into the sea, but diving towards the horizon after giving away a puff of smoke – variously interpreted as smoke caused by the plane's cannon fire or anti-aircraft fire damage. While the first J-21 downing remains unconfirmed, the second J-21, piloted by Croat Valter Juršić of the 240th Fighter-Bomber Aviation Squadron, was shot down by Neven Livajić using a 9K38 Igla and wreckage of the plane was retrieved.

Another controversy which arose in the aftermath of the battle pertains to the Žirje Island coastal artillery battery. Extent of the role played by the battery was disputed between Brigadier General Rahim Ademi, who claimed the bridge was beyond range of the guns, and thirteen ZNG and police officers, who held various posts in Šibenik at the time, who claimed Ademi was wrong in his assessment. After the war, the guns were removed from Žirje. As of 2010 two were refurbished in preparation for return to Žirje, as museum exhibits.

The battle is commemorated annually in Šibenik each September. There are two documentary films covering Šibenik and its surroundings during the battle: My city will be happy too (I moj će grad biti sretan) by Matea Šarić and September War 1991, Šibenik–Vodice (Rujanski rat 1991. Šibenik–Vodice) by Šime Strikoman.
