= Marino Selo camp =

Makeshift prison camp

- Detainment camp
- Location: Marino Selo, Croatia
- Operated by: 76th Independent Battalion Croatian National Guard (ZNG)
- Operational: November 1991-February 1992
- Inmates: Croatian Serbs
- Number of inmates: 24
- Killed: 17-18

The Marino Selo camp was a makeshift prison camp located on the premises of the fishing hut in the village of Marino Selo where Croatian Serb civilians were detained, tortured and killed by members of the 76th Independent Battalion Croatian National Guard (ZNG).

== Background ==
In 1990, following the electoral defeat of the government of the Socialist Republic of Croatia by the Croatian Democratic Union (Croatian: Hrvatska demokratska zajednica, HDZ), ethnic tensions between Croats and Serbs worsened. The self-styled Republic of Serb Krajina (RSK) declared its intention to secede from Croatia and join the Republic of Serbia while the Government of the Republic of Croatia declared it a rebellion. In June 1991 Croatia declared independence from Yugoslavia. Tensions eventually broke out into full-scale war, which lasted until 1995.

== Camp and crimes ==
At the end of 1991, members of the military police of the 76th Independent Battalion of the ZNG opened an improvised prison at the fishing hut location, in which they mentally and physically abused Serbs. At least 24 civilians had passed through the prison, and 17 had died as a result of the abuse. The camp was operational between November 1991 and February 1992.

== Trials ==
Six Croatian policemen were indicted for the crimes. On 13 March 2009 after the completion of their trial, The Požega County Court delivered a first instance court verdict that found all six guilty of war crimes: Damir Kufner, Davor Šimić, Pavao Vancaš, Tomica Poletto, Željko Tutić and Antun Ivezić. On 23 March 2010, the Supreme Court quashed the verdict of the Požega County Court War Crimes Council because of procedural omissions and transferred the case to the Osijek County Court. In 2011, the Osijek County Court sentenced Poletto to 15 years, Tutić to 12 years in prison, and released the others.
