= Littoral Banovina =

Province of the Kingdom of Yugoslavia (1929–1939)

Coordinates: 43.5000°N 16.4333°E

Littoral Banovina Primorska banovina Приморска бановина
- Banovina of the Kingdom of Yugoslavia
- 1929–1939
- Flag Coat of arms

- Littoral Banovina (red) within Kingdom of Yugoslavia (light yellow)
- Capital: Split
- Area
  - 1931: 19,653 km^{2} (7,588 sq mi)
- Population
  - 1931: 901,660
- Government
  - Type: Devolved autonomous banate
- Monarch
  - 1929–1934: Alexander I
  - 1934–1939: Peter II
- Ban
  - 1929–1932: Ivo Tartaglia
  - 1935–1939: Mirko Buić
- History
  - Established: 3 October 1929
  - 1931 Yugoslav Constitution: 3 September 1931
  - Cvetković–Maček Agreement: 26 August 1939
Succeeded by
Banovina of Croatia
- Today part of: Croatia; Bosnia and Herzegovina

The Littoral Banovina or Littoral Banate (Croatian: Primorska banovina; Serbian: Приморска бановина / Primorska banovina), was a province (banovina) of the Kingdom of Yugoslavia between 1929 and 1939. This province consisted of much of the Croatian region of Dalmatia and parts of present-day Bosnia and Herzegovina and was named for its coastal (maritime) location. The capital city of the Littoral Banovina was Split.

== Borders ==
According to the 1931 Constitution of the Kingdom of Yugoslavia,

The Littoral Banovina is bounded on the north by the southern boundaries already drawn of the Sava and Vrbas Banovinas as far as the intersection of the limits of the three districts of Jajce, Bugojno, and Travnik (Rakovce, hill 1217). From this point the boundary of the Banovina follows the eastern border of the district of Bugojno, then the northern boundary of the district of Konjic, to continue along the eastern boundary of the districts of Konjic and Mostar up to the intersection of the boundaries of the districts of Mostar, Stolac, and Nevesinje. It then continues along the eastern boundary of the district of Stolac, which it includes. On the Adriatic, the boundary of the Banovina passes through the Neretva and Pelješac channels to join the maritime frontier of the State.

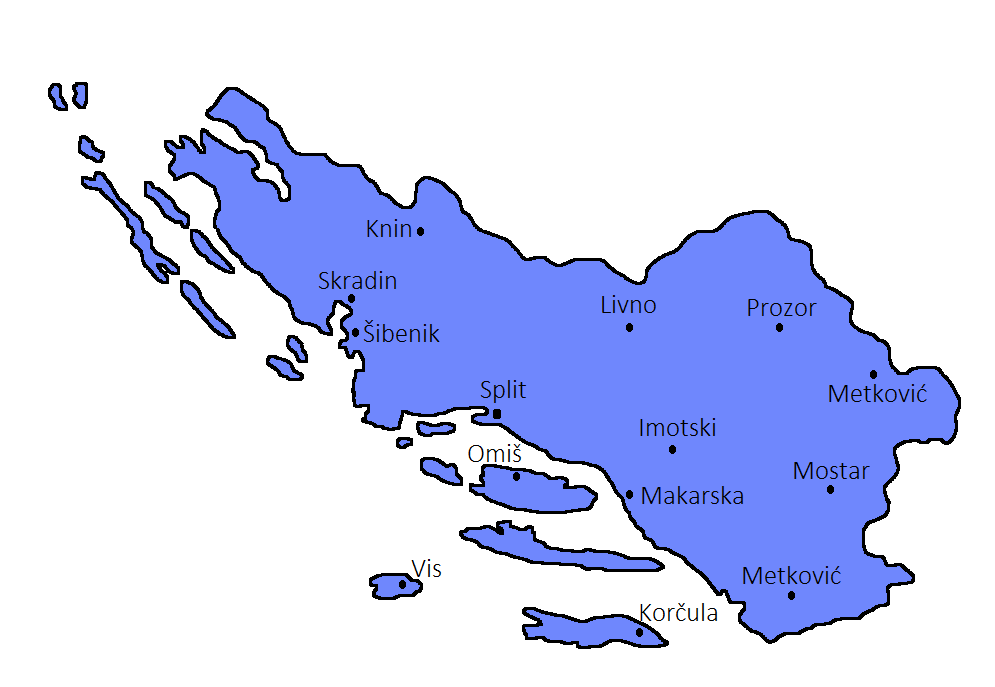
Map of the Littoral Banovina

== History ==
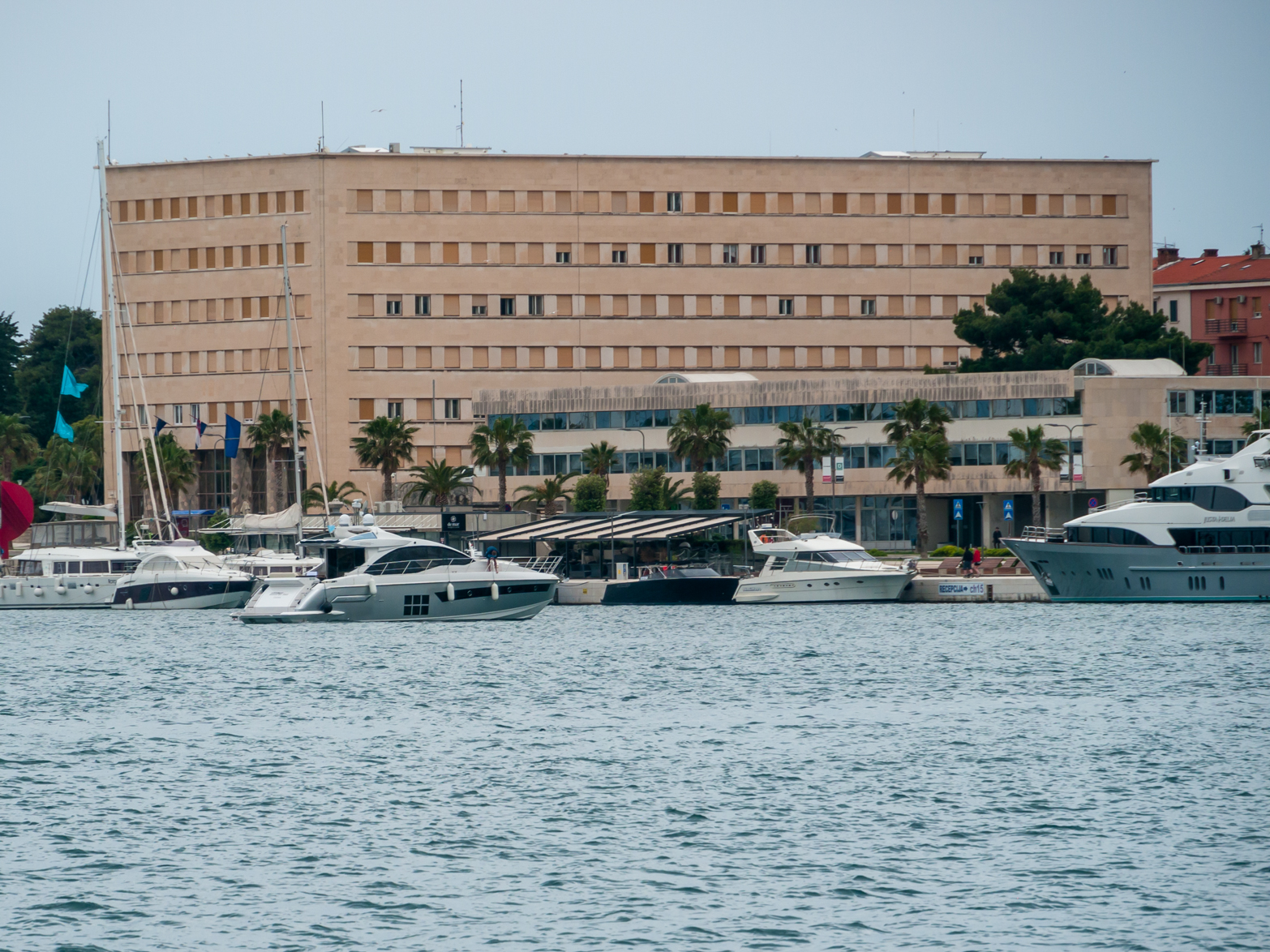
Banovina Palace in Split, built between 1936 and 1940.

In 1939, the Littoral Banovina was merged with the Sava Banovina and parts of neighboring provinces to create the Banovina of Croatia.

In 1941, the World War II Axis powers occupied the former area of the Littoral Banovina. Coastal areas from Split to Zadar were annexed by Fascist Italy with the remainder becoming a part of the Independent State of Croatia. Following World War II, the region was divided between Croatia and Bosnia and Herzegovina within a federal Communist Yugoslavia.

== Bans ==
- Ivo Tartaglia (1929–1932)
- Josip Jablanović (1932–1935)
- Mirko Buić (1935–1939)

== See also ==
- Administrative divisions of Yugoslavia
- Banovina Palace (Split)
