= Croatian National Guard =

Armed force established by Croatia in 1991

- Shoulder sleeve insignia
- Active: 15 May 1991 – 3 November 1991
- Disbanded: Renamed as the Croatian Army
- Country: Croatia
- Branch: Army
- Size: 8,000 active, 40,000 reserve troops (July 1991)
- Part of: Ministry of the Interior; Ministry of Defence (from 20 September)
- Anniversaries: 28 May
- Engagements: Croatian War of Independence

Commanders
- Minister of Defence of Croatia: Martin Špegelj
- Chief of the General Staff of the Armed Forces: Anton Tus

The Croatian National Guard (Croatian: Zbor narodne garde or ZNG) was an armed force established by Croatia in April and May 1991 during the Croatian War of Independence. Although it was established within the framework of the Ministry of the Interior for legal reasons, the ZNG was under the direct command of the Ministry of Defence. It was tasked with the protection of Croatia's borders and territory, and with tasks normally associated with police forces. The ZNG was formed with the transfer of special police units to the ZNG, establishing four all-professional brigades in May 1991, and was presented to the public in a military parade in Zagreb on 28 May. It was commanded by Defence Minister General Martin Špegelj before his resignation in early August. Špegelj was replaced by General Anton Tus, who became the first head of the General Staff of the Armed Forces of the Republic of Croatia (established on 21 September).

During its development the ZNG experienced a number of problems, including shortages of weapons and ammunition, lack of uniforms, inadequate training and an overall deficiency in trained officers, and poor staff work and command structures (preventing the effective coordination of multiple units). These problems were offset by good morale, clear objectives and high levels of mobilisation. After the Battle of the Barracks, the ZNG expanded significantly with arms captured from the Yugoslav People's Army (Jugoslovenska Narodna Armija). By the end of October 60 new brigades and independent battalions were established, and on 3 November the ZNG was renamed the Croatian Army (Hrvatska vojska).

== Background ==
In 1990, after the electoral defeat of the government of the Socialist Republic of Croatia by the Croatian Democratic Union (Croatian: Hrvatska demokratska zajednica, HDZ), ethnic tensions between Croats and Croatian Serbs worsened. The Yugoslav People's Army (Jugoslavenska narodna armija – JNA) believed that Croatia would use the Croatian Territorial Defence Force's (Teritorijalna obrana – TO) equipment to build its own army and confront the JNA. To minimize the expected resistance, the JNA confiscated the TO's weapons. On 17 August tensions escalated into an open revolt by the Croatian Serbs, centred on the predominantly Serb-populated areas of the Dalmatian hinterland near the southern town of Knin, parts of the Lika, Kordun and Banovina regions and eastern Croatia. They established a Serbian National Council in July 1990 to coordinate opposition to Croatian President Franjo Tuđman's policy of pursuing independence for Croatia. Milan Babić, a dentist from Knin, was elected president and Knin police chief Milan Martić established paramilitary militias. The two men eventually became the political and military leaders of the SAO Krajina, a self-declared state incorporating the Serb-inhabited areas of Croatia.

The JNA learned about Croatia's intention to develop its own military force from JNA Captain Vladimir Jager, a double agent employed by Croatia and the JNA Counterintelligence Service (KOS). The JNA devised Operation Shield (Štit), aimed at disarming the Croatian forces and the arrest and trial of the Croatian leadership, in response. Although the operation was prepared by December 1990, federal Defence Minister General Veljko Kadijević never sought authorisation to carry it out from the Yugoslav Presidency. Instead, he ordered the KOS to stand down on the morning the operation was scheduled to begin.

At the beginning of 1991 Croatia had no regular army, and to bolster its defence Croatia doubled the size of its police force to about 20,000. The most effective part of the force was the 3,000-strong special police, deployed in a military organisation of 12 battalions; in addition, there were 9,000–10,000 regionally-organised reserve police officers. Although the reserve police were set up in 16 battalions and 10 companies, they lacked weapons (which were needed to arm the troops).

== History ==
=== Establishment ===
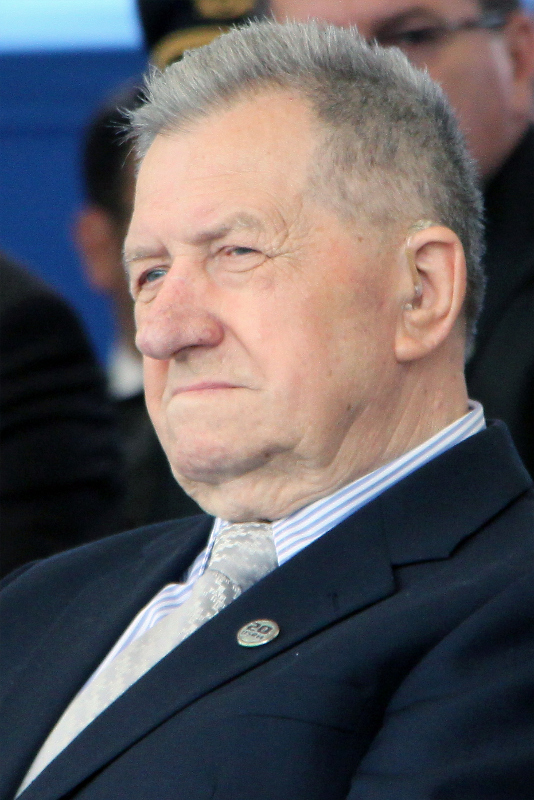
General Martin Špegelj commanded the Croatian National Guard after its inception.

Preparations for the ZNG began on 12 April 1991. Its formation as a police force with military capability was considered necessary by Croatian authorities after March clashes in Pakrac and at Plitvice Lakes and the possibility of further confrontation with the JNA. Since it was illegal to establish a separate military in a constituent republic of Yugoslavia, the ZNG was planned as part of the police force under the Ministry of the Interior. Parliament amended the Internal Affairs Act on 18 April, and the ZNG was formally established five days later. It was tasked with the protection of the constitutional order, the maintenance of public order, anti-terrorist operations, the protection of Croatia's borders, territory, coast and territorial waters, valuable structures and high-profile individuals. Although the ZNG was formally subordinate to the Ministry of the Interior, its founding legislation stipulated that it would be commanded by the Ministry of Defence.

On 5 May the number of ZNG troops and their composition was determined, followed by operational guidelines issued by Defence and Interior Ministers Martin Špegelj and Josip Boljkovac for the transfer of police personnel to the ZNG on 10 May. By 15 May several special police units (SPUs) transferred to the ZNG, forming four brigades. By July the ZNG had approximately 8,000 troops and, unlike other Croatian forces, were fully equipped with small arms. The reserve police force, numbering about 39,000 in April, was also transferred to reserve ZNG brigades and independent battalions. On 18 May the Zrinski Battalion was established as a special forces unit of the ZNG, its core consisting of 27 volunteers drawn from the Kumrovec SPU. Initially, it also relied on former French Foreign Legion troops. By July, the reserve force of 40,000 ZNG troops was assigned to 19 brigades and 14 independent battalions; however, they did not possess sufficient heavy or small arms for all their personnel. The Croatian police had approximately 15,000 small arms, with less than 30,000 additional weapons obtained from abroad by August.

On 28 May, the ZNG was presented to the public in a military parade at the Kranjčevićeva Street Stadium to boost morale. The parade featured approximately 800 soldiers, a dozen anti-aircraft systems, armoured cars and several armoured personnel carriers; the Presidential Guards and Alkars also participated.

Initial Croatian National Guard order of battle
Unit	Nickname	Foundation	Commander
1st Guards Brigade	Tigers (Tigrovi)	5 November 1990	Josip Lucić
2nd Guards Brigade	Thunder (Gromovi)	15 May 1991	Božo Budimir
3rd Guards Brigade	Martens (Kune)	29 April 1991	Eduard Bakarec
4th Guards Brigade	none	28 April 1991	Ivo Jelić

=== Development problems ===
To command individual units, regional ZNG commands were established in eastern Slavonia, the Banovina–Kordun area, Lika, central and northern Dalmatia, southern Dalmatia and Zagreb in late July and August. Crisis headquarters, which also had command authority of ZNG units, were established down to the municipal level. The command structure was particularly poor, preventing effective coordination between units. Although the many crisis headquarters were entrusted with a high level of authority, they consisted of politicians with little (if any) military training other than JNA service. Multiple units deployed to a single area often had no authority coordinating their activities. TO command systems were reactivated in some places (such as Zagreb), somewhat improving the situation.

Other problems faced by the ZNG included a shortage of trained officers, inadequate troop training, a shortage of weapons and especially a shortage of ammunition. Mobilisation proved particularly successful, however, and troops were plentiful; in Zagreb, approximately 80 percent of those called up in September and October reported for service. The ZNG were short of uniforms; 20 percent of those drafted in Zagreb during this period received uniforms, while the remainder fought in civilian clothes. The ZNG also relied on the civilian infrastructure for food, fuel and medical care.

Špegelj was replaced by Šime Đodan as Defence Minister in July. He remained in command of the ZNG until 3 August, when he resigned over Tuđman's refusal to authorise attacks against JNA barracks. After Špegelj's resignation, command of the ZNG was entrusted to General Anton Tus.

=== Transition to the Croatian Army ===
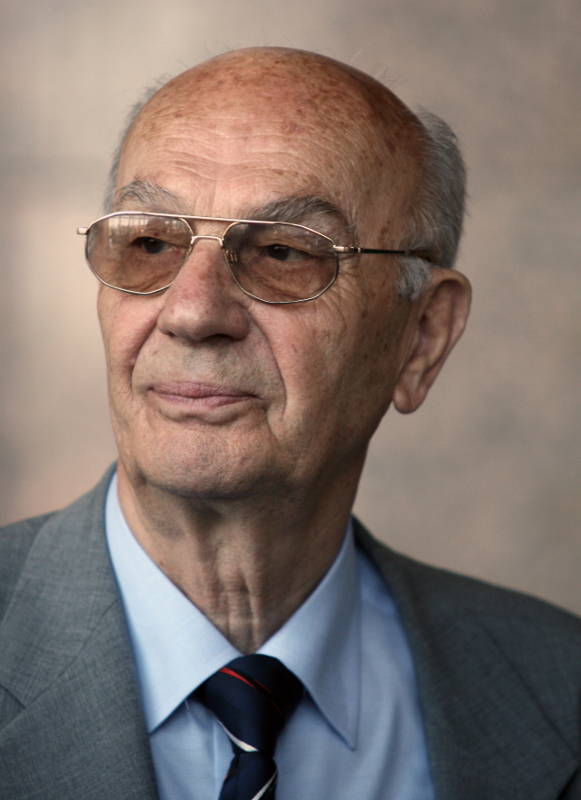
General Anton Tus, the first head of the General Staff of the Armed Forces of the Republic of Croatia

In mid-September the regional commands were replaced by six operational zones, headquartered in Osijek, Bjelovar, Zagreb, Karlovac, Rijeka and Split. The zones possessed uneven strength; those in Slavonia and Dalmatia were heavily equipped, and the Zagreb zone had twice the average troop strength. After capturing a stockpile of weapons during the Battle of the Barracks, the ZNG expanded to 60 reserve brigades and independent battalions by the end of October (in addition to the four all-professional guards brigades). Although each brigade was planned to have 1,800 troops, in reality their size varied from 500 to 2,500. Three named special-forces battalions were also established within the ZNG (in addition to the Zrinski Battalion): the Frankopan, Kralj Tomislav and Matija Vlačić Battalions.

Croatian National Guard operational zones
Operational Zone	Headquarters	Commander
1st Osijek	Osijek	Brigadier Karl Gorinšek
2nd Bjelovar	Bjelovar	Brigadier Miroslav Jezerčić
3rd Zagreb	Zagreb	Brigadier Stjepan Mateša
4th Karlovac	Karlovac	Brigadier Izidor Češnjaj
5th Rijeka	Rijeka	Brigadier Anton Rački
6th Split	Split	Brigadier Mate Viduka

Croatian National Guard/Croatian Army reserve brigades, October 1991
Unit	Operational zone	Established	Headquarters
100th Infantry Brigade	3rd Zagreb	June 1991	Zagreb
101st Infantry Brigade	3rd Zagreb	June 1991	Zagreb
105th Infantry Brigade	2nd Bjelovar	June 1991	Bjelovar
106th Infantry Brigade	1st Osijek	June 1991	Osijek
107th Infantry Brigade	1st Osijek	June 1991	Valpovo
108th Infantry Brigade	1st Osijek	June 1991	Slavonski Brod
109th Infantry Brigade	1st Osijek	June 1991	Vinkovci
110th Infantry Brigade	4th Karlovac	June 1991	Karlovac
112th Infantry Brigade	6th Split	June 1991	Zadar
113th Infantry Brigade	6th Split	June 1991	Šibenik
114th Infantry Brigade	6th Split	June 1991	Split
111th Infantry Brigade	5th Rijeka	July 1991	Rijeka
103rd Infantry Brigade	3rd Zagreb	August 1991	Zabok
104th Infantry Brigade	2nd Bjelovar	August 1991	Varaždin
99th Infantry Brigade	3rd Zagreb	September 1991	Zagreb
204th (or 124th) Infantry Brigade	1st Osijek	September 1991	Vukovar
115th Infantry Brigade	6th Split	October 1991	Imotski
117th Infantry Brigade	2nd Bjelovar	October 1991	Koprivnica
118th Infantry Brigade	5th Rijeka	October 1991	Gospić
119th Infantry Brigade	5th Rijeka	October 1991	Pula
123rd Infantry Brigade	1st Osijek	October 1991	Požega
125th Infantry Brigade	3rd Zagreb	October 1991	Novska
126th Infantry Brigade	6th Split	October 1991	Sinj
127th Infantry Brigade	2nd Bjelovar	October 1991	Virovitica
128th Infantry Brigade	5th Rijeka	October 1991	Rijeka
129th Infantry Brigade	4th Karlovac	October 1991	Karlovac
130th Infantry Brigade	1st Osijek	October 1991	Osijek
131st Infantry Brigade	1st Osijek	October 1991	Županja
132nd Infantry Brigade	1st Osijek	October 1991	Našice
133rd Infantry Brigade	5th Rijeka	October 1991	Otočac
134th Infantry Brigade	6th Split	October 1991	Biograd na Moru
137th Infantry Brigade	4th Karlovac	October 1991	Duga Resa
138th Infantry Brigade	5th Rijeka	October 1991	Delnice
145th Infantry Brigade	3rd Zagreb	October 1991	Zagreb–Dubrava
148th Infantry Brigade	3rd Zagreb	October 1991	Zagreb–Trnje
149th Infantry Brigade	3rd Zagreb	October 1991	Zagreb–Trešnjevka
150th Infantry Brigade	3rd Zagreb	October 1991	Zagreb–Črnomerec
153rd Infantry Brigade	3rd Zagreb	October 1991	Velika Gorica

On 20 September Parliament enacted the Defence Act, specifying that the ZNG and the Croatian Army (Hrvatska vojska – HV) comprised the Armed Forces of the Republic of Croatia. At the same time, the armed forces were formally subordinated to the Ministry of Defence rather than the Ministry of the Interior. The legislation also designated the TO reserve units as a constituent part of the ZNG reserve force. The following day the General Staff of the Armed Forces of the Republic of Croatia was established, headed by Tus. On 8 October (the day Croatia declared its independence) the Defence Act was amended, with the ZNG redefined as a part of the HV. ZNG reserve units became the HV reserve, named the Home Guard (Domobranstvo), leaving the ZNG an all-professional force. The ZNG was renamed the HV on 3 November 1991.

=== Service ===
ZNG units participated is a number of significant battles in the early part of the war, attempting to hold back Yugoslav forces. These include the battles of Gospić, Šibenik and Zadar, where the ZNG defended cities in Lika and along the Dalmatian coast against the JNA and its allies. The ZNG also took part in the battles of Vukovar and Osijek in eastern Slavonia, defended Dubrovnik and contributed to the capture of the JNA barracks and Operation Hurricane-91 (an attempt to push the JNA out of western Slavonia.

Significant battles of the Croatian National Guard
Battle	Date*	Notes
Battle of Gospić	29 August – 22 September 1991	Defence of Gospić and capture of JNA barracks in the city
Battle of Šibenik	16–22 September 1991	Successful defence of Šibenik and capture of part of the JNA barracks in the city
Battle of Zadar	16 September – 5 October 1991	Successful defence of Zadar and capture of part of the JNA barracks in the city
Battle of Vukovar	25 August – 18 November 1991	Unsuccessful defence of the city of Vukovar; disrupted the JNA campaign in Croatia
Battle of Osijek	August 1991 – June 1992	Successful defence of Osijek, although the ZNG lost some ground around the city
Siege of Dubrovnik	1 October 1991 – 31 May 1992	Successful defence of the city of Dubrovnik
Battle of the Barracks	14 September – 23 November 1991	Capture of a large store of JNA weapons and ammunition, enabling a significant increase in ZNG capability
Battle of Logorište	4–6 November 1991	Indecisive battle to contain a JNA garrison near Karlovac; the garrison broke out from a ZNG siege, but the ZNG captured the barracks
Operation Hurricane-91	29 October 1991 – 3 January 1992	ZNG offensive to recapture western Slavonia around the town of Okučani, stopped by a ceasefire implementing the Vance plan
*Dates pertain to overall duration of the battle; however, the reserve units of the ZNG were transformed into the reserve units of the HV on 8 October and the remainder of the ZNG was renamed the HV in November.

== Legacy ==
The HV continued to grow, numbering about 200,000 troops by the end of 1991. Although the force successfully countered the JNA that year, the HV was deficient in organisation, training and heavy-weapons support. By the end of 1991, the HV still lacked sufficient resources to push back the JNA and continued experiencing inadequate work by their staff. Nonetheless, like the ZNG it benefited from its troops' high morale and the well-defined purpose of its mission. The growth and systematic improvement of HV capability accelerated in 1992, continuing throughout the Croatian War of Independence. The anniversary of the ZNG parade at the Kranjčevićeva Street Stadium is celebrated annually in Croatia as Armed Forces Day and Croatian Army Day.
