= Kijevo, Croatia =

Kijevo
- Municipality
- Općina Kijevo; Municipality of Kijevo
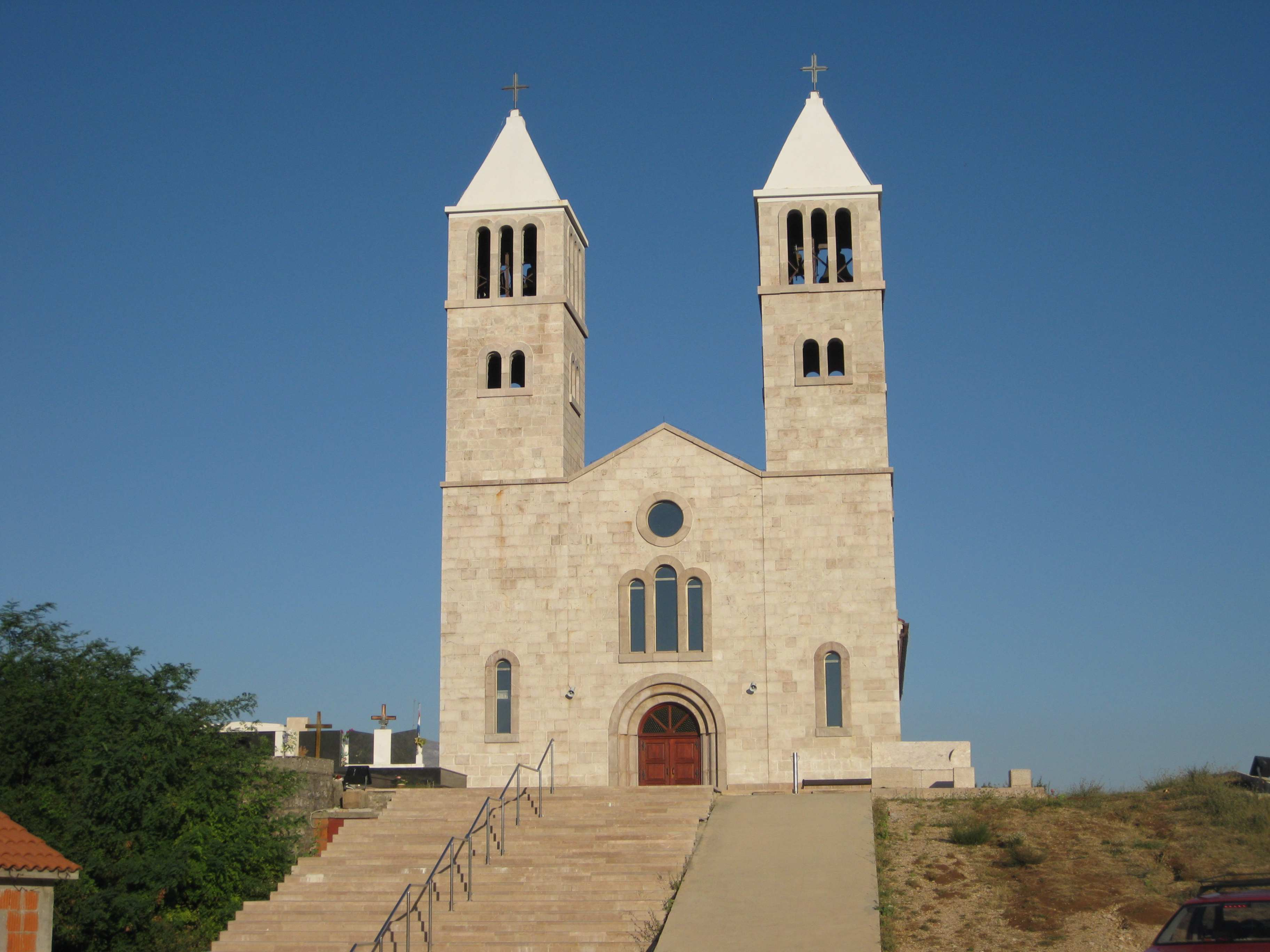

- Flag Coat of arms
- Interactive map of Kijevo
- Location within Croatia
- Coordinates: 43°58′30″N 16°21′30″E
- Country: Croatia
- Region: Dalmatia (Dalmatian Hinterland)
- County: Šibenik-Knin County

Government
  - Mayor: Martin Ercegovac (HDZ)

Area
  - Total: 76.9 km^{2} (29.7 sq mi)

Population (2021)
  - Total: 272
  - Density: 3.54/km^{2} (9.16/sq mi)
- Time zone: UTC+1 (CET)
  - Summer (DST): UTC+2 (CEST)
- Postal code: 22300 Knin
- Website: kijevo.hr

Kijevo is a village and the only settlement in the eponymous municipality of Kijevo in Dalmatia, southeast of Knin in the Šibenik-Knin County of Croatia.

The population of the municipality is 417 (2011), with 100% declaring themselves as Croats and Roman Catholics. Kijevo is an underdeveloped municipality which is statistically classified as the First Category Area of Special State Concern by the Government of Croatia.

== Location ==
Kijevo lies underneath the Dinara mountain, near the source of the river Cetina. It is located on the State route D1 between the towns of Vrlika and Knin.

== History ==
Thirty-four people from Kijevo died in World War I.

In World War II, Kijevo became part of the Independent State of Croatia fascist puppet state ruled by Nazi Germany and Italy. In the spring of 1942, the town was liberated by Yugoslav Partisans. The attack resulted in approximately half the village population fleeing the village, and resettling in Slavonia and Syrmia. On January 27, 1943, Kijevo was attacked by Chetniks at a time when there was no military defence in the town, resulting in the deaths of 45 civilians. A total of 209 people from Kijevo died during the war.

Kijevo gained infamy during the Croatian War of Independence in 1990 and 1991 when it became the site of the 1991 siege of Kijevo, which involved the Yugoslav People's Army under Ratko Mladić and the forces of SAO Krajina under Milan Martić who encircled the Croat-inhabited village, defended by an isolated outpost of the Croatian Police. By the end of the year, the enclave was attacked and overrun and the bulk of the population left after the artillery had destroyed much of their settlements. The ethnic cleansing of Croats in Kijevo was later prosecuted by the International Criminal Tribunal for the former Yugoslavia.

== Demographics ==
Kijevo: Population trends 1857–2021
v

population	1276	1230	1279	1499	1836	2125	2125	2707	1741	1830	1853	1736	1341	1261	533	417	272
	1857	1869	1880	1890	1900	1910	1921	1931	1948	1953	1961	1971	1981	1991	2001	2011	2021

Sources: Croatian Bureau of Statistics publications

== Notable people ==
Bonaventura Božić (c. 1693 - 1761), Croatian military writer and translator
