= Croatian Trade Union Association =

HUS
- Croatian Trade Union Association
- Hrvatska Udruga Sindikata
- Founded: December 1990
- Headquarters: Zagreb, Croatia
- Location: Croatia
- Members: 41,584 (11 unions)
- Key people: president Miroslav Hrašćanec
- Website: www.hus.hr

The Croatian Trade Union Association (HUS) is a trade union centre in Croatia. It is located in Zagreb.
