= Kruševo, Zadar County =

Kruševo
- settlement (village)
- Interactive map of Kruševo
- Location within Croatia
- Coordinates: 44.179192°N 15.647940°E
- Country: Croatia
- County: Zadar
- Municipality: Obrovac

Area
  - Total: 60.9 km^{2} (23.5 sq mi)

Population (2021)
  - Total: 372,925
  - Density: 6,120/km^{2} (15,900/sq mi)

Kruševo is a village in northern Dalmatia, Croatia located south of Obrovac. The population is 1,112 (census 2011).
