= Law enforcement in Croatia =

Croatian Police Hrvatska policija
- Emblem of the Croatian Police

Agency overview
- Formed: 5 August 1990; 36 years ago
- Employees: 24,973 of which 19,976 are uniformed officials
- Annual budget: €1.491.496.529

Jurisdictional structure
- National agency: HR
- Operations jurisdiction: HR
- Governing body: Ministry of the Interior
- General nature: Local civilian police

Operational structure
- Headquarters: Zagreb, Ulica grada Vukovara 33
- Minister responsible: Davor Božinović, Minister of Internal Affairs
- Agency executive: Nikola Milina, General Police Director
- Police Administrations: 20

Facilities
- Airbases: Lučko (LDZL)
- Helicopters: 9

Website
- mup.gov.hr

Law enforcement in Croatia is the responsibility of the Croatian Police (Croatian: Hrvatska policija), which is the national police force of the country subordinated by the Ministry of the Interior of the Republic of Croatia, carrying out certain tasks, the so-called, police activities, laid down by law.

The Police deals with the following affairs: protection of individual life, rights, security and integrity, protection of property, prevention and detection of criminal offences, misdemeanors, search for perpetrators of criminal offences, violations and their bringing before competent authorities, control and management of road traffic, conducting affairs with aliens, control and security of state border, and other affairs defined by law.

In the operative sense, police affairs are divided into affairs related to public peace and order, affairs related to security of public gatherings, affairs of the border police, affairs of safety of road traffic, affairs of counter-explosive protection, affairs of the criminal police, crime-technical affairs, crime-files affairs, administrative affairs, nationality-related affairs, status questions and asylum, affairs of protection and rescue, inspection affairs and technical affairs.

In recent years, the force has been undergoing a reform with assistance from international agencies, including the Organization for Security and Co-operation in Europe since OSCE Mission to Croatia began there on 18 April 1996, with Croatia being admitted to OSCE on March 24, 1992.

== Police powers ==
Police powers are actually a set of rights that the police can, under the conditions prescribed by law, use in certain situations.

With regard to their meaning, police powers are prescribed by the Police Act, namely by the method of exhaustive standardization (enumeration) and they are:

- checking and establishing the identity of persons and objects,
- summoning,
- bringing,
- searching for persons and objects,
- temporary restriction of freedom of movement,
- giving warnings and orders,
- temporary confiscation of objects,
- polygraph testing,
- inspection of premises, premises, facilities and documentation,
- inspection of persons, objects and means of transport,
- security and inspection of the scene,
- receipt of reports,
- public announcement of awards,
- filming in public places,
- use of means of coercion,
- protection of victims of crime and other persons,
- collection, processing and use of personal data.

There are four points or situations when the police are allowed to open fire. The police may discharge their firearm in:

- necessary defence (protection of one's own life or the life of another person)
- last resort (elimination of an impending unculpable danger to one's own and others' lives that cannot be eliminated otherwise),
- preventing the escape or arrest of the perpetrator of a serious crime (acts punishable by at least 10 years)
- preventing the escape of a person who has escaped from serving a prison sentence for which a prison sentence of at least ten years is prescribed, and the escape cannot be prevented in any other way.

== Organization ==
Flag of Croatian Police

The General Police Directorate (Croatian: Ravnateljstvo policije) is an administrative organization of the Ministry of the Interior constituted for conducting police affairs. The General Police Directorate is responsible for:

- screening and analysis of the state of security and developments leading to the emergence and development of crime;
- harmonization, guidance and supervision over the work of Police Directorates and Police Administrations;
- immediate participation in particular more complex operations of Police Directorates and Police Administrations;
- providing for the implementation of the international agreements on police cooperation and other international acts under the competence of the General Police Directorate;
- organizing and conducting of criminal forensics operations;
- setting the prerequisites for the efficient work of the Police Academy;
- adopting of standards for the equipment and technical means;
- setting the prerequisites for the police readiness to act in the state of emergency.

General Police Directorate is headed by General Police Director (Croatian: glavni ravnatelj policije).

There are the following organization forms within General Police Directorate:

- Police Directorate (Uprava policije)
- Criminal Police Directorate (Uprava kriminalističke policije)
- Border Police Directorate (Uprava za granicu)
- Command of Special Police (Zapovjedništvo specijalne policije)
- Operational Communication Centre (Operativno–komunikacijski centar policije)
- Forensic Centre (Centar za kriminalistička vještačenja)
- Police Academy (Policijska akademija)
- Special Security Affairs Directorate (Uprava za posebne poslove sigurnosti)

For immediate conducting of police affairs there are 20 Police Administrations (policijske uprave) divided into four categories, which cover the territory of the Republic of Croatia according to the organization of units of local self-government (counties or županije).

Police stations are established for direct police and other affairs in each Police Administration.

== Border control ==
Croatia has had an external border with the Schengen area since the accession of the country to the EU. As part of the major migration movements from 2015, Croatia became part of the so-called Balkan route. The European Border Agency Frontex has a small mission in Croatia to assist the police at various border crossings. In July 2018 Frontex organized the air reconnaissance of the border with Bosnia with a reconnaissance aircraft as part of the Frontex 'Multipurpose Aerial Surveillance (MAS). The aircraft transmit moving images of remote sensing cameras in real time to the Frontex Situation Center (FSC) in Warsaw, Poland. In 2023, Croatia became a Schengen Zone member state.

=== Critics ===
For several times NGOs report, that the Croatian police illegally and arbitrarily deport refugees to Bosnia-Herzegovina, i.e. from the EU (push-backs). It would come again and again to attacks by the Croatian officials on the refugees.

== Ranks ==
=== Regular Police (Temeljna policija) ===
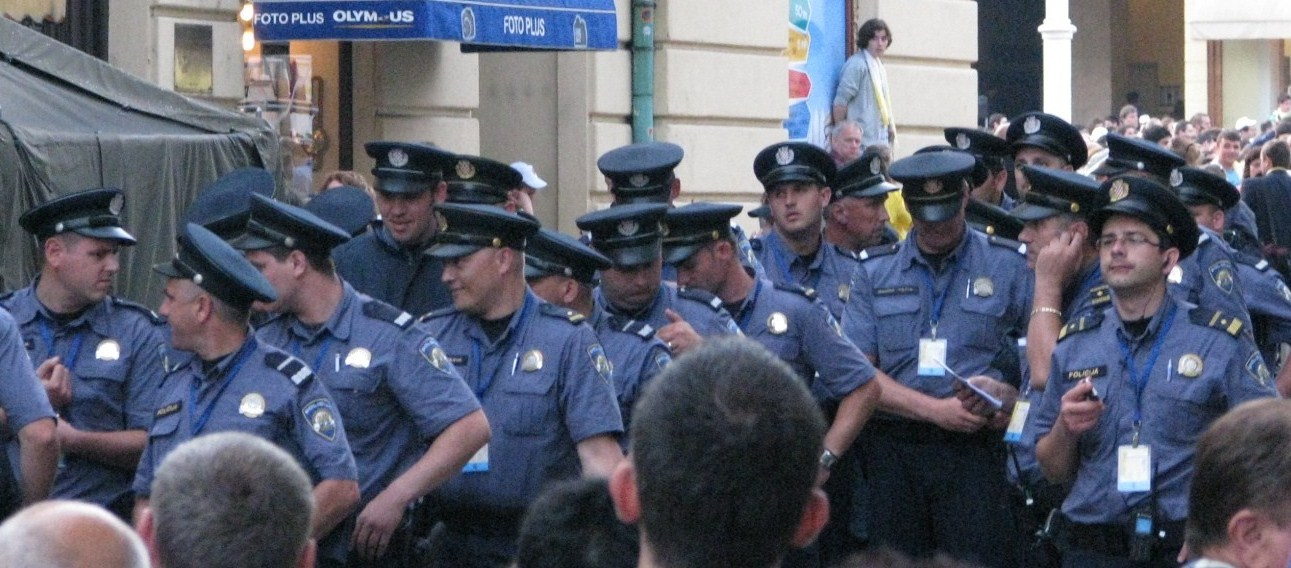
Regular Police members

Probationer with Secondary School	Police college Cadet	Police Officer	Senior Police Officer	Police Sergeant	Senior Police Sergeant	Police Inspector	Senior Police Inspector	Leading Police Inspector	Chief Police Inspector	Police Commissioner	Police Senior Commissioner	Deputy Police Director	Police Director
Policajac vježbenik SSS	Policajac vježbenik VŠS/VSS	Policajac	Viši policajac	Policijski narednik	Viši policijski narednik	Policijski inspektor	Viši policijski inspektor	Samostalni policijski inspektor	Glavni policijski inspektor	Policijski savjetnik	Glavni policijski savjetnik	Zamjenik ravnatelja policije	Ravnatelj policije

=== Intervention Police (Interventna policija) ===
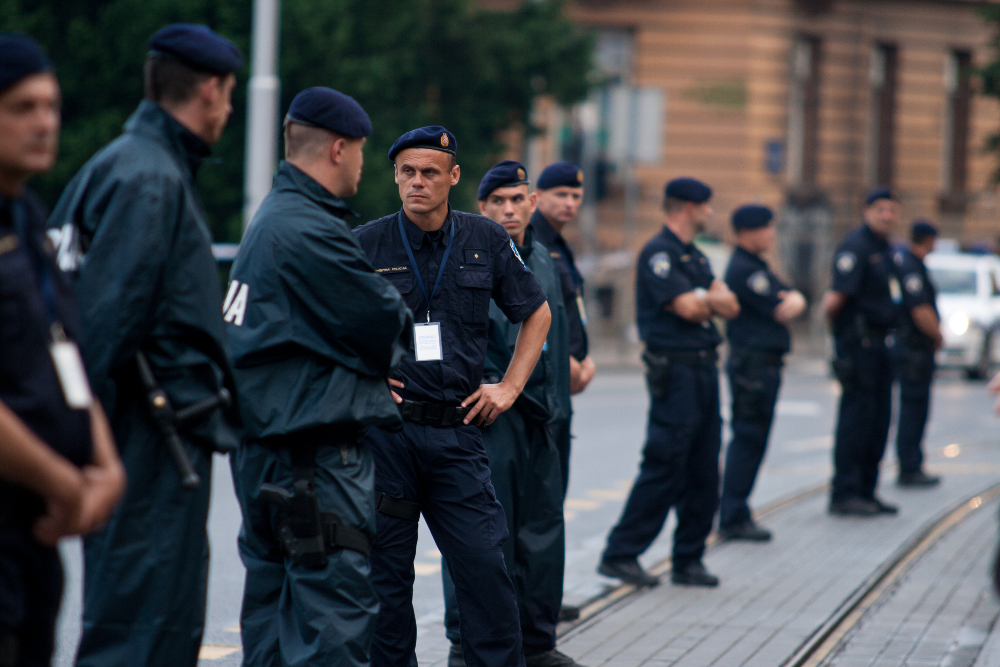
Intervention Police members

Police officer in intervention group	Leader of intervention group	Commander of a section in intervention Police	Commander of platoon in Intervention Police - Instructor	Assistant Commander of troop in Intervention Police	Commander of troop in Intervention Police	Deputy/Assistant Commander of Intervention Police unit	Commander of Intervention Police unit	Instructor in headquarters of Intervention Police	Assistant Commander of Intervention Police	Commander of Intervention Police
Policajac u interventnoj policiji	Vođa grupe u interventnoj policiji	Zapovjednik odjeljenja	Zapovjednik voda – instruktor	Pomoćnik zapovjednika satnije interventne policije	Zapovjednik satnije interventne policije	Zamjenik zapovjednika – pomoćnik zapovjednika	Zapovjednik jedinice interventne policije	Policijski službenik – instruktor	Pomoćnik zapovjednika interventne policije	Zapovjednik interventne policije

=== Special Police (Specijalna policija) ===
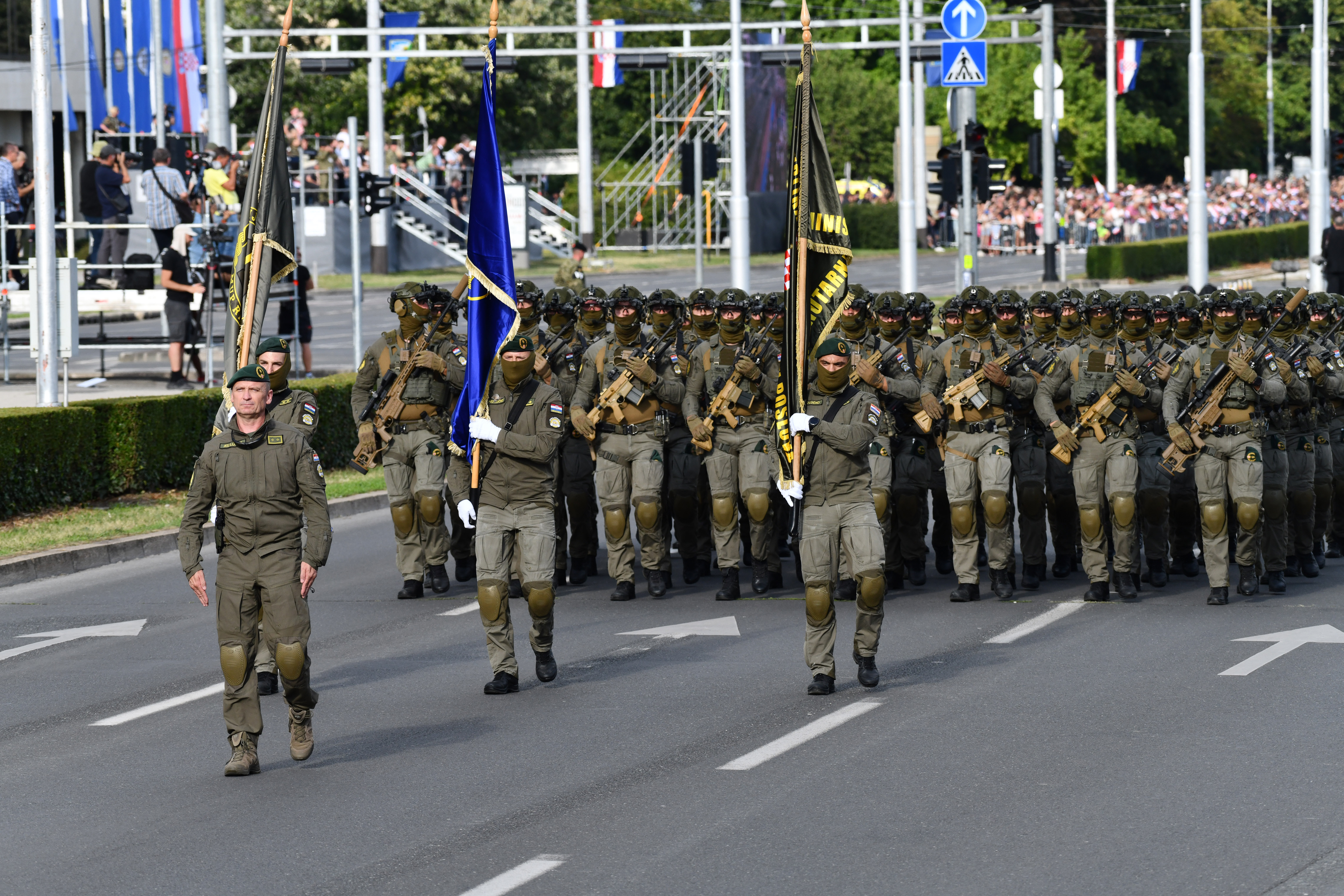
Special Police members of Anti-Terrorist Unit Lučko.

Police Officer - specialist	Leader of specialized group	Instructor - Commander of platoon in Special Police	Assistant Commander of Intervention Police unit	Commander of Special Police unit	Instructor in headquarters of Special Police	Assistant Commander of Special Police	Commander of Special Police
Policajac - specijalac	Vođa specijalističke grupe	Instruktor – zapovjednik voda u specijalnoj jedinici policije	Pomoćnik zapovjednika specijalne jedinice policije	Zapovjednik specijalne jedinice policije	Instruktor u zapovjedništvu specijalne policije	Pomoćnik zapovjednika specijalne policije	Zapovjednik specijalne policije

== Equipment ==
=== Firearms ===
Model	Image	Origin	Type	Calibre	Notes
HS Produkt HS2000		Croatia	Semi-automatic pistol	9×19mm Parabellum	Standard issue sidearm.
CZ 75		Czech Republic	Semi-automatic pistol	9×19mm Parabellum	
HS Produkt Kuna		Croatia	Personal defense weapon	9×19mm Parabellum	Standard issue.
Heckler & Koch MP7		Germany	Personal defense weapon	4.6×30mm HK	
Heckler & Koch UMP		Germany	Submachine gun	9×19mm Parabellum /.45 ACP	
Heckler & Koch G36C		Germany	Assault rifle	5.56×45mm NATO	Standard issue. Short barrel variant predominant.
HS Produkt VHS-2		Croatia	Assault rifle	5.56×45mm NATO	
Heckler & Koch HK417		Germany	Assault rifle	5.56×45mm NATO	
Heckler & Koch HK417		Germany	Designated marksman rifle	7.62×51mm NATO	Standard issue designated marksman rifle.
Sako TRG		Finland	Bolt action sniper rifle	8.6x70 mm	Standard issue sniper rifle.

=== Vehicles ===
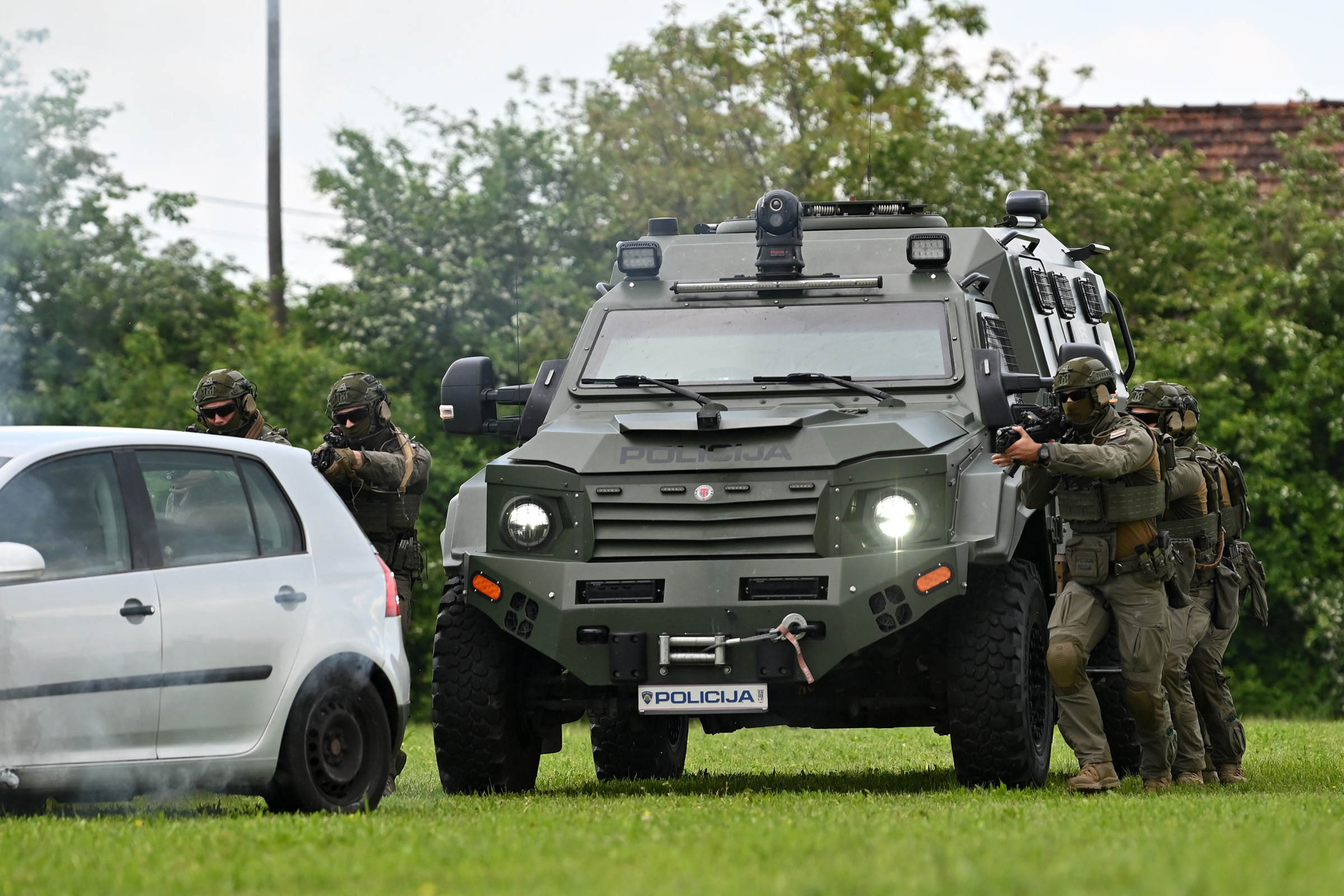
Croatian Special Police

Most vehicles in the Croatian police fleet are acquired through leasing agreements, which typically last three to five years. This approach allows the Ministry of the Interior to maintain a modern and technologically up-to-date fleet without large upfront expenditures. At the end of each lease term, vehicles are returned and replaced with new models, resulting in frequent rotation of patrol cars, vans, and motorcycles. Leasing also often includes maintenance and service provisions, reducing operational burdens. Consequently, the police fleet is regularly updated with vehicles such as Škoda Octavia patrol cars, Ford Focus sedans, BMW motorcycles, and Mercedes-Benz or Volkswagen transport vans, ensuring consistent operational readiness across all police units.

Ministry of Interior also operates a large number of unmarked vehicles assigned to government officials and for other uses, all in black variant and they are mostly Audi A8, Audi A6, Volkswagen Caravelle, Toyota Land Cruiser.

Model	Origin	Type	Notes
Škoda Octavia Combi	Czech Republic	Police car	General purpose police vehicle.
Ford Focus Connected	United States	Police car	
Volkswagen Caravelle	Germany	Police van	
Volkswagen Crafter	Germany	Police van	
Mercedes Benz Sprinter	Germany	Police van	
Ford Ranger	United States	Pickup truck	Used for the needs of the Border Police.
Toyota Land Cruiser	Japan	SUV	Both in unmarked variant for the use with government officials and in marked variant for Border Police.
Suzuki Vitara	Japan	SUV	Used for the needs of the Border Police.
BMW R1250 RT	Germany	Police motorcycle	
BMW F850 GS	Germany	Police motorcycle	
Terradyne Armored Vehicles MPV	Canada	Armoured personnel carrier	
CVT-6000	Croatia	Water cannon vehicle	
Cantiere Navale Vittoria V-800HR	Italy	Police watercraft	

=== Helicopters ===
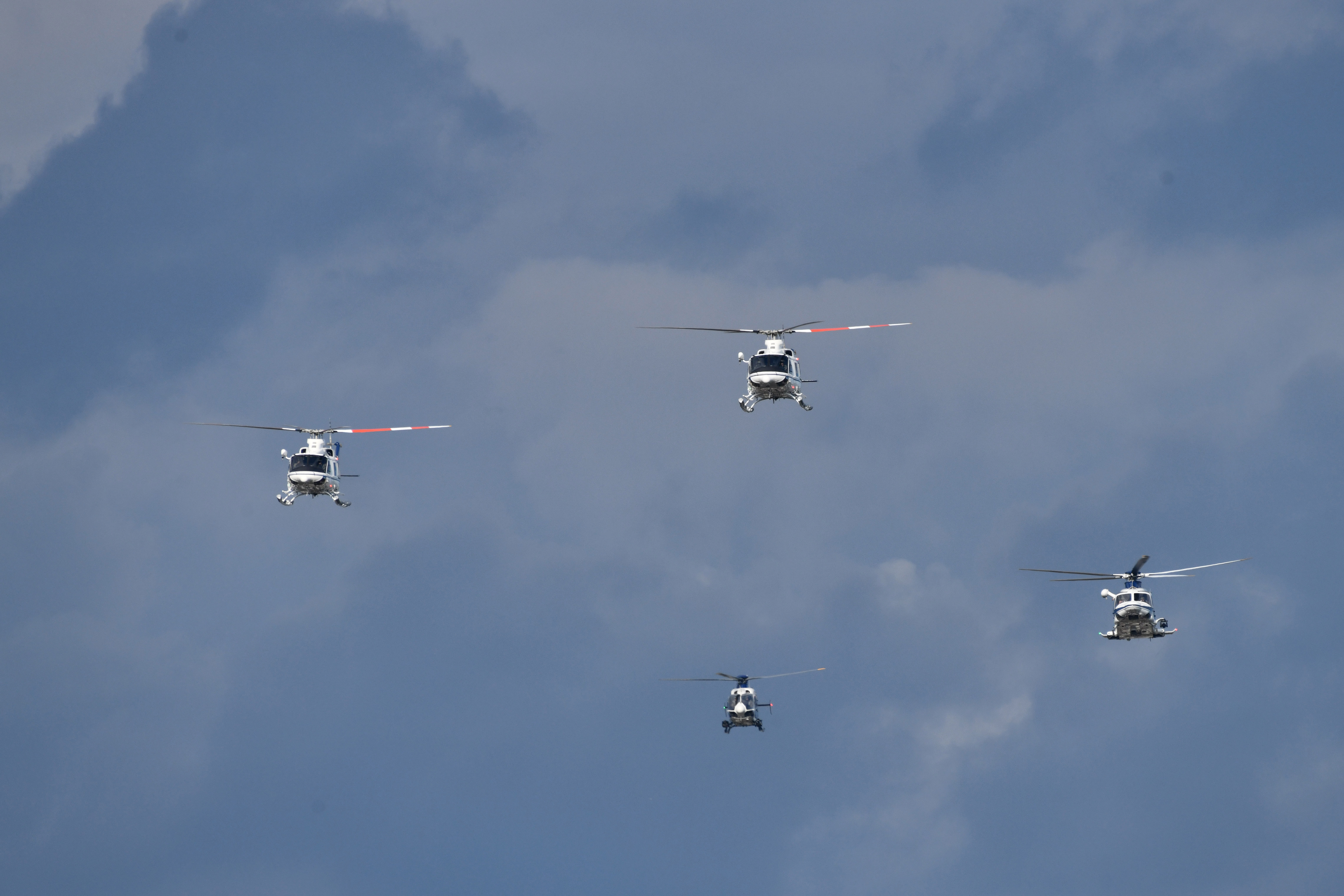
Croatian Police helicopters during 2025 Military parade flyover.

Aircraft	Origin	Variant	In Service	Notes
Bell 206	United States	Bell 206B	3	
AgustaWestland AW139	Italy	AW139	2	
Eurocopter EC135	France	Eurocopter EC135 P2+	2	
Bell 412	United States	Subaru-Bell 412EPX	2	

== Controversies ==
According to human rights organizations, Croatian police has been accused of overt and, generally unpunished, brutality. Amnesty international has issued a detailed report on the allegations of torture of refugees and migrants, while the Human Rights Watch has criticized the organization impunity of violence and unlawful pushbacks at their borders.

In 2021, the Border Violence Monitoring Network published a report into the use of torture and inhuman treatment during pushbacks by Croatian police. They assert that:

- 87% of pushbacks carried out by Croatian authorities contained one or more forms of violence and abuse that we assert amounts to torture or inhuman treatment
- Unmuzzled police dogs were encouraged by Croatian officers to attack people who were detained
- Croatian officers forcibly undressed people, setting fire to their clothes and pushed them back across international borders in a complete state of undress

== See also ==
- Croatian special police order of battle in 1991–95
- Ministry of the Interior (Croatia)
- USKOK
- United Nations Civilian Police Support Group
