= Siege of Bjelovar Barracks =

Part of the Battle of the Barracks

Coordinates: 45.903407°N 16.833721°E

- Part of the Battle of the Barracks
- Major barracks of the JNA 32nd Corps, 29 September 1991
Date	14 – 29 September 1991
Location	Croatia
Result	Croatian victory

Belligerents
Yugoslavia	Croatia

Commanders and leaders
Milan Tepić ‡‡ Rajko Kovačević (executed)	(Croatia) Želimir Škarec

Units involved
Yugoslav People's Army: Yugoslav Ground Forces	Croatian National Guard; Croatian Police

Strength
550	Unknown

Casualties and losses
14 killed 30 wounded 425 captured	17 killed
- 5 civilians killed, 70 Croatian troops and civilians wounded

The siege of Bjelovar Barracks, also known by the codename Operation Bilogora (Croatian: Operacija Bilogora), was the blockade and capture of the Yugoslav People's Army (JNA) barracks and other facilities in and around the city of Bjelovar, a part of the JNA 32nd (Varaždin) Corps, during the Croatian War of Independence. A general blockade of the JNA facilities in Croatia was ordered on 14 September 1991, and it continued until 29 September when the JNA garrison was captured by Croatian forces. Its capture occurred one week after the bulk of the 32nd Corps surrendered. It was part of the Battle of the Barracks—an effort by Croatian armed forces to isolate JNA units based at barracks in Croatia, or capture the barracks to provide arms for Croatia's nascent army.

The fighting resulted in the capture of a substantial stock of weapons, including 78 tanks, 77 infantry fighting vehicles and 13 artillery pieces greater than 100-millimetre (3.9 in) caliber. The clash also caused considerable damage to the city of Bjelovar and its surroundings due to artillery fire and the explosion of an ammunition storage depot on the outskirts of the city. The fighting erupted despite a ceasefire that had been arranged days before, and caused JNA General Veljko Kadijević to withdraw from negotiations regarding the ceasefire's implementation. He subsequently issued an ultimatum to Croatian authorities, warning against the capture of further JNA facilities.

== Background ==
In 1990, ethnic tensions between Serbs and Croats worsened after the electoral defeat of the government of the Socialist Republic of Croatia by the Croatian Democratic Union (Croatian: Hrvatska demokratska zajednica – HDZ). The Yugoslav People's Army (Serbian: Jugoslovenska Narodna Armija – JNA) confiscated Croatia's Territorial Defence (Croatian: Teritorijalna obrana – TO) weapons to minimize resistance. On 17 August, the tensions escalated into an open revolt of the Croatian Serbs, centred on the predominantly Serb-populated areas of the Dalmatian hinterland around Knin (approximately 60 kilometres (37 miles) north-east of Split), parts of the Lika, Kordun, Banovina and eastern Croatia. In January 1991, Serbia, supported by Montenegro and Serbia's provinces of Vojvodina and Kosovo, unsuccessfully tried to obtain the Yugoslav Presidency's approval for a JNA operation to disarm Croatian security forces. The request was denied and a bloodless skirmish between Serb insurgents and Croatian special police in March prompted the JNA itself to ask the Federal Presidency to give it wartime authority and declare a state of emergency. Even though the request was backed by Serbia and its allies, the JNA request was refused on 15 March. Serbian President Slobodan Milošević, preferring a campaign to expand Serbia rather than to preserve Yugoslavia with Croatia as a federal unit, publicly threatened to replace the JNA with a Serbian army and declared that he no longer recognized the authority of the federal Presidency. The threat caused the JNA to abandon plans to preserve Yugoslavia in favour of expansion of Serbia as the JNA came under Milošević's control. By the end of March, the conflict had escalated with the first fatalities. In early April, leaders of the Serb revolt in Croatia declared their intention to amalgamate the areas under their control with Serbia. These were viewed by the Government of Croatia as breakaway regions.

At the beginning of 1991, Croatia had no regular army. To bolster its defence, Croatia doubled its police numbers to about 20,000. The most effective part of the Croatian police force was 3,000-strong special police comprising twelve battalions organised along military lines. There were also 9,000–10,000 regionally organised reserve police in 16 battalions and 10 companies, but they lacked weapons. In response to the deteriorating situation, the Croatian government established the Croatian National Guard (Croatian: Zbor narodne garde – ZNG) in May by expanding the special police battalions into four all-professional guards brigades. Under Ministry of Defence control and commanded by retired JNA General Martin Špegelj, the four guards brigades comprised approximately 8,000 troops. The reserve police, also expanded to 40,000, was attached to the ZNG and reorganised into 19 brigades and 14 independent battalions. The guards brigades were the only units of the ZNG that were fully equipped with small arms; throughout the ZNG there was a lack of heavier weapons and there was poor command and control structure above the brigade level. The shortage of heavy weapons was so severe that the ZNG resorted to using World War II weapons taken from museums and film studios. At the time, the Croatian weapon stockpile consisted of 30,000 small arms purchased abroad and 15,000 previously owned by the police. To replace the personnel lost to the guards brigades, a new 10,000-strong special police was established.

== Prelude ==
The views of the Croatian leadership on how to deal with the JNA's role in the Croatian Serb revolt gradually evolved between January and September 1991. Croatian President Franjo Tuđman's initial plan was to win European Community (EC) and United States support, so he dismissed Špegelj's advice to seize JNA barracks and storage facilities in Croatia in late 1990. During the Ten-Day War in June and July 1991, Špegelj once again urged Tuđman to act while the JNA fought Slovenia's TO. Špegelj's calls were echoed by Šime Đodan, who succeeded him as Defence Minister in July. Špegelj remained in command of the ZNG.

Tuđman's initial stance was based on his belief that Croatia could not win a war against the JNA. The ZNG was therefore limited to conducting defensive operations, even though the actions of the JNA appeared to be coordinated with Croatian Serb forces. This impression was reinforced by buffer zones established by the JNA after fighting between Croatian Serb militia and the ZNG. The JNA often intervened after the ZNG had lost territory, leaving the Croatian Serbs in control of areas they had captured before the JNA stepped in. The JNA provided some weapons to the Croatian Serbs, although most of their weaponry was sourced from Serbia's TO and the Serbian Ministry of Internal Affairs.

In July 1991, Špegelj and Đodan's advice was supported by a number of Croatian Parliament members. In response, Tuđman dismissed Đodan the same month he was appointed Defence Minister, and Špegelj resigned his command of the ZNG on 3 August. The deteriorating situation in eastern Croatia, including the JNA expulsion of ZNG troops from Baranja, intermittent fighting around Osijek, Vukovar and Vinkovci, increasing losses and the growing conviction that the JNA were actively supporting the Croatian Serb revolt, forced Tuđman to act. On 22 August, he issued an ultimatum to the federal Yugoslav authorities demanding the withdrawal of the JNA to its barracks by the end of the month. The ultimatum stated that if the JNA failed to comply, Croatia would consider it an army of occupation and take corresponding action. On 1 September, the EC proposed a ceasefire and a peace conference was accepted by the Yugoslav Presidency and by Tuđman, despite his earlier ultimatum. The conference started on 7 September, but only four days later, the Croatian member and chair of the presidency, Stjepan Mesić, ordered the JNA to return to its barracks within 48 hours. This order was motivated by Tuđman's concern that the conference would drag on while the ZNG lost territory. Even though the order was opposed by other members of the presidency, it gave Croatia justification to openly confront the JNA.

Prime Minister Franjo Gregurić advised Tuđman to implement Špegelj's plan. According to General Anton Tus, Tuđman ordered the ZNG to capture JNA barracks on 12 September, but rescinded the order the next day. The order was reinstated on 14 September after Tus pleaded with Tuđman to re-authorize action, arguing that the ZNG was running out of time. The same day, the ZNG and the Croatian police blockaded and cut utilities to all JNA facilities it had access to, beginning the Battle of the Barracks. This action comprised blockades of 33 large JNA garrisons in Croatia, and numerous smaller facilities, including border posts, and weapons and ammunition storage depots.

== Order of battle ==
Since 1988, the JNA's Bjelovar garrison had been included in the 32nd Corps, which was headquartered in Varaždin, and was the second largest JNA corps in Croatia. It commanded the 32nd Mechanised Brigade and the 32nd Mixed Artillery Regiment both based in Varaždin, the 32nd Engineer Regiment in Čakovec, the 411th Mixed Antitank Artillery Regiment based in Križevci, the 73rd Motorised Brigade headquartered in Koprivnica, the 265th Mechanised Brigade based in Bjelovar, and the 288th Mixed Antitank Artillery Brigade in Virovitica. The JNA did not have sufficient troops in the area to secure all its facilities, but it was possible that the 5th (Banja Luka) Corps units deployed to Okučani might attempt to relieve some of the garrisons. A part of the 265th Mechanised Brigade was deployed to Koprivnica to reinforce the 73rd Motorised Brigade. It consisted of a battalion of tanks and one engineer battalion, and they were relocated to Koprivnica in August 1990 to boost the JNA's presence in the town. A battlegroup comprising 23 armoured and 14 other vehicles, drawn from the 265th Mechanised Brigade and commanded by Lieutenant Colonel Milan Čeleketić, was deployed to Okučani. It was attached to the 5th Corps on 15 August to prevent Croatian special police from ousting Croatian Serb forces from the town.

Bjelovar also hosted the headquarters of the 28th Partisan Division (TO) and one of the division's brigades. The most significant JNA facility in Bjelovar and its immediate surroundings was the Božidar Adžija Barracks, situated on the western outskirts of the city. The barracks housed Bjelovar garrison headquarters and the bulk of the weaponry of the 265th Mechanised Brigade, and approximately 500 officers and soldiers. There was a JNA non-combat facility in the centre of Bjelovar, protected by a small security detail, a radar base and an anti-aircraft defence communications hub in the village of Zvijerci, adjacent to the settlement of Trojstveni Markovac on the northern outskirts of Bjelovar, and two storage depots. The Logor Depot was used to store tanks and other equipment of the 265th Mechanised Brigade and weapons that had been confiscated from the TO in Bjelovar, and was guarded by approximately 50 troops. The Barutana Depot was used to store ammunition. Unlike the Logor Depot, which was situated in the city itself, the Barutana Depot was located in the Bedenik Forest near Bjelovar.

Croatia established a company-sized special police unit in Bjelovar on 23 February 1991. Following the deterioration of the situation in western Slavonia, the 105th Brigade of the ZNG was raised in the city, largely equipped with small arms only, and plans for a blockade of the routes in and out of the city were developed. A crisis headquarters was set up to coordinate the defence of the city and the manufacture of weapons in industrial plants which had been modified for their production.

== Timeline ==
=== Growing tensions and the blockade ===
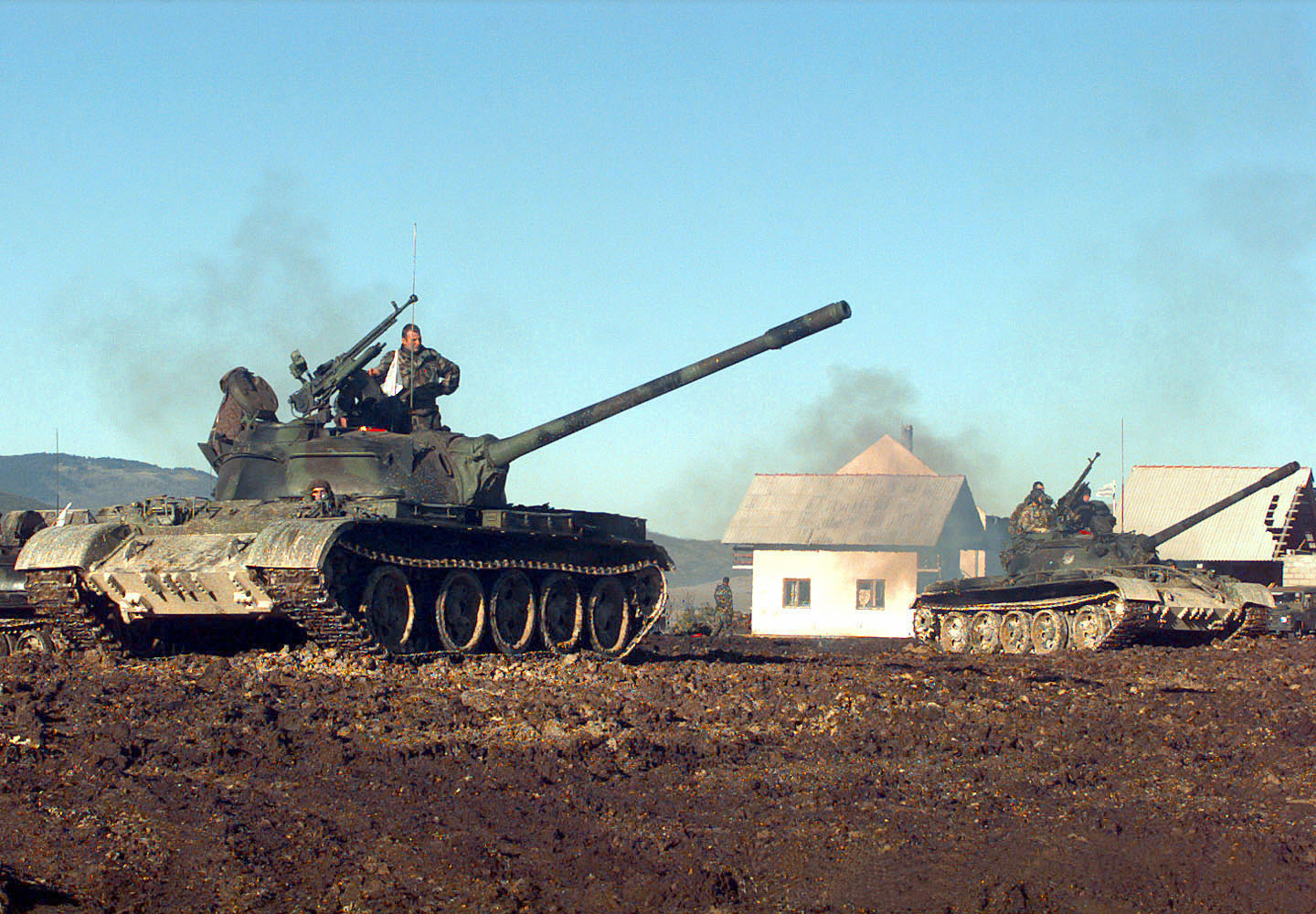
The ZNG captured 75 JNA T-55 tanks in Bjelovar.

The first significant conflict involving the JNA in the Bjelovar area occurred on 1 September, when 14 JNA officers and soldiers were disarmed at a Croatian checkpoint. The commanding officer of the Bjelovar JNA garrison, Colonel Rajko Kovačević, demanded that the weapons to be returned, however the Croatian forces declined the request, claiming that the weapons had already been sent to Zagreb. Tensions greatly increased after 18 ZNG troops from the 105th Brigade, deployed from Bjelovar, went missing during the Battle of Kusonje on 9 September. The civilian authorities in the city demanded that the JNA provide information on their fate, but the JNA declared it had no knowledge of the matter.

By 22 September, Croatian forces had besieged and captured all major garrisons of the 32nd Corps, except those in Bjelovar and Koprivnica. The JNA garrisons in those two cities were ordered to extract themselves to territory near Okučani that was under the control of the 5th Corps. The Koprivnica-based garrison was ordered to break out to Bjelovar, link up with the 265th Mechanised Brigade, then proceed towards Daruvar via Grubišno Polje. At the same time, the Bjelovar garrison had been blockaded, and its utilities and supplies were cut. Negotiations ensued for the surrender of the garrison, led by the civilian crisis headquarters presided over by Jure Šimić. The negotiations stalled when the JNA demanded that the 265th Mechanised Brigade be allowed to evacuate to Okučani or Bosnia and Herzegovina. At the time, a number of Croatian Serb civilians took refuge in the barracks either fearing for their safety or in order to isolate themselves from the Croatian authorities.

=== Preparations for attack ===
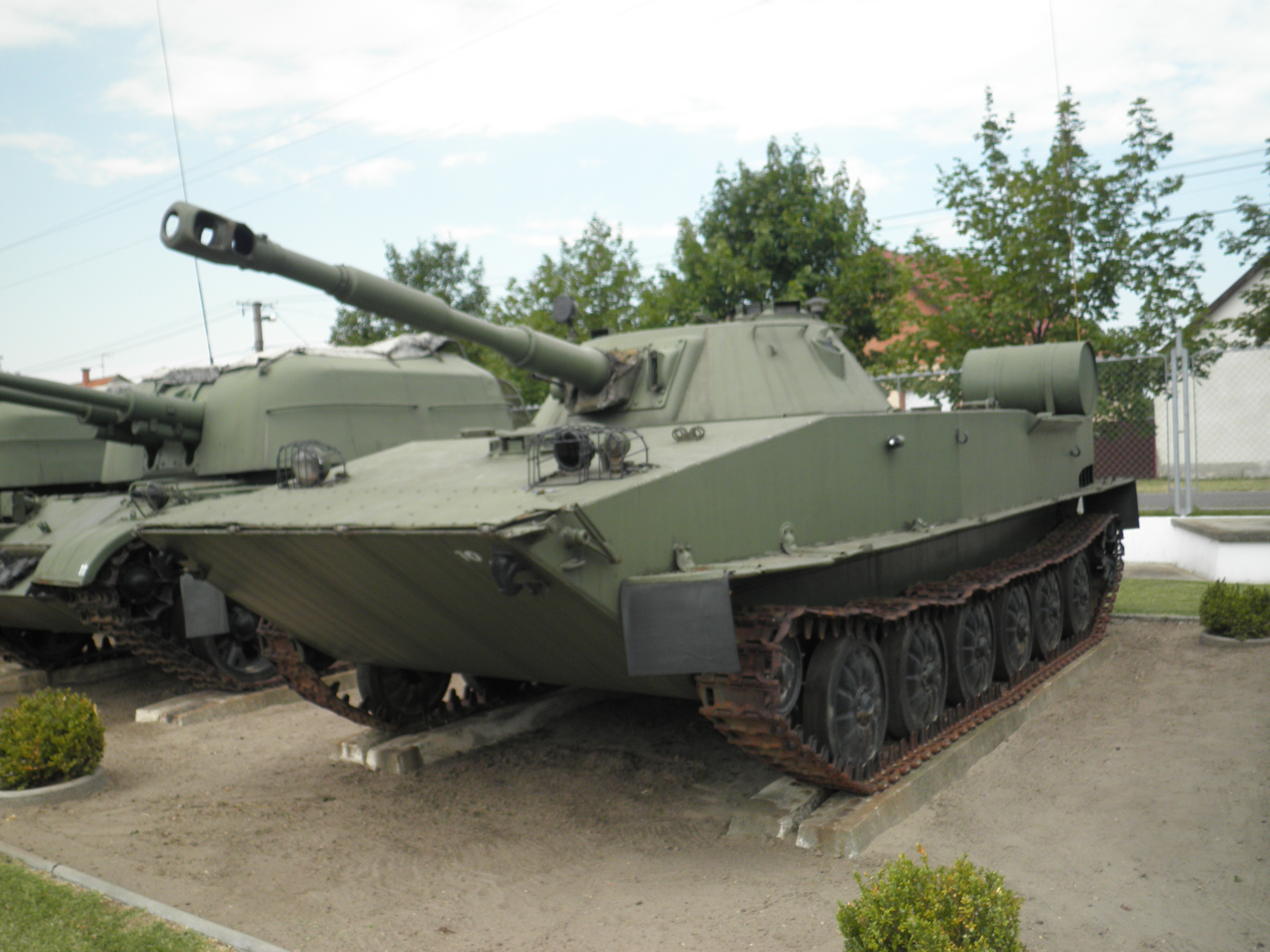
Three PT-76 amphibious tanks were captured by the ZNG in Bjelovar.

Preparations to seize the JNA facilities in Bjelovar took place on 21–29 September. These involved the placing of obstacles around the JNA facilities, setting up of artillery and air defence units, and drafting of plans to capture the JNA garrison, codenamed Operation Bilogora. The 1st Battalion of the 105th Brigade was deployed to around the villages of Bedenik and Velika Pisanica, the 2nd Battalion in the village of Narta, and the 3rd Battalion north of Bjelovar, thereby encircling the city. In the city itself, nine battlegroups were deployed to attack armoured units which might attempt a breakout. Air defence systems consisting of two 12.7-millimetre (0.50 in) machine guns and two 20-millimetre (0.79 in) anti-aircraft guns were set up in nearby villages. A battery of towed 100-millimetre (3.9 in) T-12 antitank guns was deployed to the Hrgovljani area. In an attempt to mitigate an overall shortage of anti-tank weapons, 200 Molotov cocktails were sent from Zagreb and three armoured personnel carriers armed with 9M14 Malyutka anti-tank guided missile systems arrived from Virovitica on 23 September. The crisis headquarters was to coordinate all activities of the Croatian armed forces based in Bjelovar, as well as reinforcements received from Varaždin after the JNA garrison based there surrendered, but Colonel Želimir Škarec, a member of the General Staff of the Armed Forces of the Republic of Croatia, was appointed as the commanding officer of the military operation.

Despite the ceasefire agreement signed on 22 September between the JNA and Croatia, which provided for the resumption of supplies to the JNA barracks, the authorities in Bjelovar refused to restore utilities, claiming that the agreement allowed for the supply of JNA officers and soldiers only, but there were also civilians sheltering in the barracks. On 27 September, the Croatian General Staff directed that the garrison be captured on 28–30 September. Tus, acting as the Chief of the General Staff, ordered the clandestine killing of extremists before they caused mass killing of civilians or great material damage. According to Tus, this order was based on an assessment that there were extremist JNA officers present in Bjelovar, intent on carrying out such acts.

=== Capture of the garrison ===
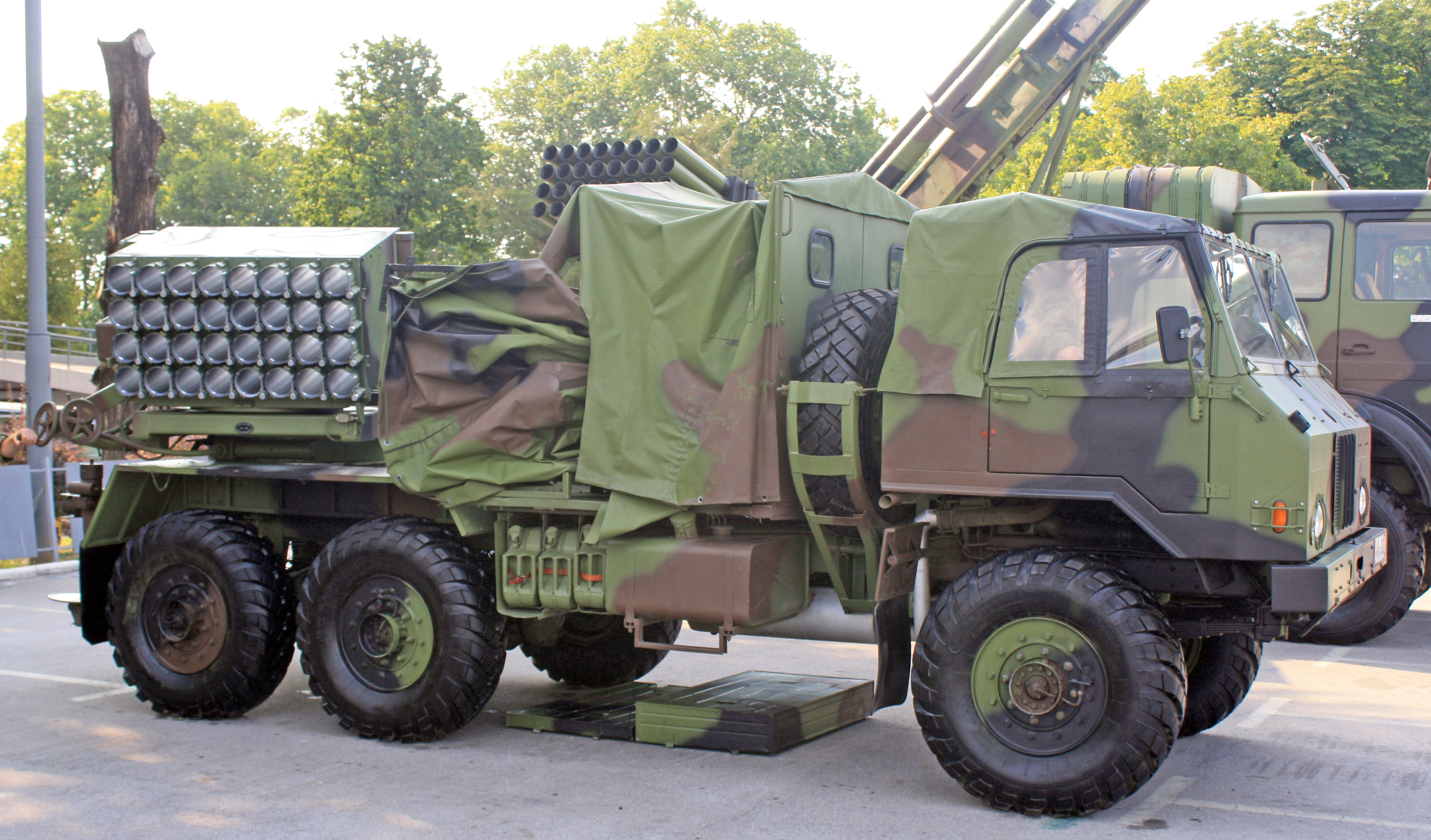
The ZNG captured four JNA M-63 Plamen multiple rocket launchers in Bjelovar.

On the morning of 29 September, the ZNG and Croatian police attacked the JNA facilities in Bjelovar. In response, Kovačević contacted the JNA 5th Military District in Zagreb and requested airstrikes against the city and the ZNG. The sources do not indicate if the requested airstrikes were carried out. The 5th Military District instead pressured the central Croatian authorities to order the ZNG in Bjelovar to observe a comprehensive ceasefire previously agreed between Croatia and the JNA on 22 September. In order to verify the ceasefire, the European Community Monitor Mission (ECMM) deployed a monitoring team to the city. However, the authorities in Bjelovar ignored the order they received from the General Staff and stopped the ECMM team before it reached the city. According to Šimić, the move was made after Lieutenant General Petar Stipetić telephoned him and urged him to continue the attack. The authenticity of Šimić's account of has been disputed by Admiral Davor Domazet-Lošo, who claims it was an attempt to discredit Croatia before the ECMM. At 19:00, the ZNG captured Božidar Adžija Barracks. By that time, all other JNA facilities in and near Bjelovar had been captured.

Before Barutana Depot was captured by the ZNG, one of the four storage structures, containing 1,700 tonnes (1,700 long tons; 1,900 short tons) of ammunition, was blown up by JNA Major Milan Tepić. The explosion occurred at 10:43, killing Tepić, and eleven ZNG troops who were blockading the depot in Bedenik Forest. The blast knocked down trees in a circle 200 metres (660 feet) wide, caused damage to nearby structures, and could be heard 20 kilometres (12 miles) away. The JNA lost another soldier in the area of the depot, killed by an antitank missile while he was engaging the ZNG using an infantry fighting vehicle gun.

== Aftermath ==
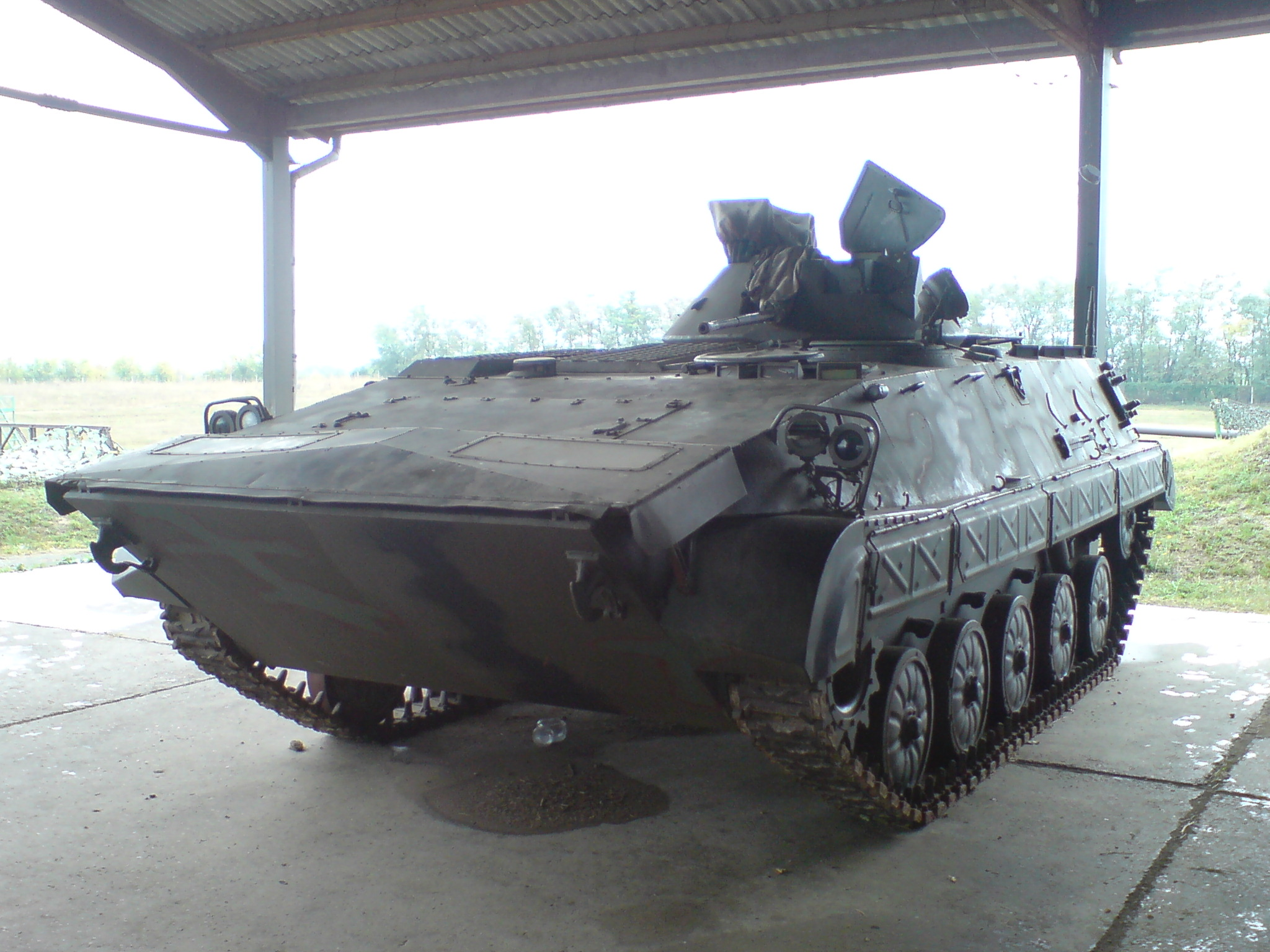
Croatian forces acquired 77 JNA BVP M-80 IFVs from barracks in Bjelovar.

The JNA suffered 14 killed, and 30 wounded during the siege and capture of the Bjelovar barracks. The ZNG lost 17 dead, and five civilians were killed. There were 70 wounded ZNG troops and civilians combined. The ZNG troops captured 60 JNA officers and 365 soldiers. The captured troops were released on 14 November, in a prisoner exchange between Slavonski Šamac and Bosanski Šamac. Equipment captured by the ZNG included 75 T-55 and three PT-76 tanks, nine 122-millimetre (4.8 in) howitzers, four M-63 Plamen multiple rocket launchers, 77 BVP M-80 infantry fighting vehicles, small arms previously confiscated from the Bjelovar TO, and weapons of the 1st Brigade of the 28th Partisan Division (TO) including 1,300 assault rifles and machine guns and approximately 100 trucks. During the fighting, 437 residential structures, 513 apartments, 169 utility structures and 25 public and commercial buildings were damaged or destroyed in Bjelovar and Hrgovljani. The following day, the only remaining major unit of the 32nd Corps—the 73rd Motorised Brigade based in Koprivnica—surrendered to the ZNG.

The capture of the JNA barracks in Bjelovar also affected the ceasefire agreement reached between the JNA and Croatia in Igalo, specifically a provision regarding the lifting of the blockade of the JNA barracks there. Initially there was a dispute between Tuđman and JNA General Veljko Kadijević as to whether it meant achieving normal living conditions in the barracks or complete freedom of movement for the JNA in Croatia. A compromise interpretation was negotiated, only to be dropped by Kadijević specifically because of the events in Bjelovar. On 1 October, Kadijević issued an ultimatum to Croatia threatening destruction of one civilian facility vital to the Croatian population for each military post captured by the ZNG. The ultimatum demonstrated that the JNA considered Croatia enemy territory, rather than part of the country it had a responsibility to protect.

Tepić was considered a hero in Serbia because he preferred to die rather than surrender. He was posthumously awarded the Order of the People's Hero by the Presidency of Yugoslavia on 19 November 1991, becoming the last recipient of the order. The authorities in Serbia subsequently painted his actions as heroic, and used him as a model for their soldiers.

In 2005, authorities in Bjelovar announced they would file war crime charges against two unnamed JNA officers. In 2010, Šimić was charged with war crimes, specifically the killing of prisoners of war. According to the charges filed by the County Court of Bjelovar, Šimić or several persons directly commanded by him killed Kovačević and two other JNA officers after they surrendered on 29 September. As of 2014, the trial is in progress. Four other persons were tried on charges of killing of six prisoners of war captured at the Božidar Adžija Barracks. These prisoners, along with one civilian who had been held in custody since 2 September, were taken to the Česma Forest near the village of Malo Korenovo to be shot. The soldiers were killed, but the civilian survived, although he sustained severe injuries. The four accused were acquitted in 2012. Škarec and Chief of Staff of Bjelovar TO Stjepan Budimski were charged with disobeying the orders issued by the General Staff, and were imprisoned. After spending several months in custody, Škarec and Budimski were released without formal charges. Škarec was discharged from the Croatian armed forces.
