= Siege of Varaždin Barracks =

Croatian National Guard siege during the Croatian War of Independence

Coordinates: 46.304618°N 16.342974°E

- Part of the Battle of the Barracks
- Major barracks of the JNA 32nd Corps, 22 September 1991
Date	14 – 22 September 1991
Location	Croatia
Result	Croatian victory

Belligerents
Yugoslavia	Croatia

Commanders and leaders
Vladimir Trifunović (POW)	(Croatia) Ivan Rukljić (Croatia) Želimir Škarec (Croatia) Radimir Čačić

Units involved
Yugoslav People's Army: Yugoslav Ground Forces	Croatian National Guard; Croatian Police

Strength
1,000	1,000–2,000

Casualties and losses
2 killed 15 wounded 1,000 captured	2 killed 24 wounded
- 2 civilians killed

The siege of Varaždin Barracks, also referred to locally as Varaždin's days of war (Croatian: Varaždinski dani rata), was the blockade and capture of the Yugoslav People's Army (JNA) barracks and other facilities in and around the city of Varaždin during the Croatian War of Independence. The blockade began on 14 September 1991, quickly escalated into fighting, and ended on 22 September with the surrender of the JNA garrison. It was part of the Battle of the Barracks—an effort by Croatian armed forces to isolate JNA units based at barracks in Croatia, or capture the barracks to provide arms for Croatia's nascent army.

The besieging force outnumbered the JNA garrison in Varaždin, which was divided among several barracks, storage depots and other facilities, but the JNA possessed substantially greater firepower. The balance shifted in favour of the Croatian forces after smaller JNA posts were captured in the first few days of the siege, until only one barracks along with the headquarters of the JNA 32nd Corps remained under JNA control. At that point, the commander of the 32nd Corps, Major General Vladimir Trifunović, and the civilian authorities in Varaždin agreed that the remaining JNA forces in the city would surrender, but all those wishing to leave would be permitted to do so, leaving their weapons behind.

The capture of the 32nd Corps' weapons was the most significant achievement of the Battle of the Barracks, and greatly augmented the capabilities of the Croatian military. After he left Croatia, Trifunović was indicted for war crimes by Croatia, tried in absentia and convicted for the combat deaths of six Croatian soldiers and the wounding of dozens of Croatian citizens before and during the siege. He was also prosecuted by Yugoslav authorities for treason, but subsequently pardoned. In 2013, he requested a re-trial on his Croatian war crimes conviction, but died before proceedings could commence.

== Background ==
In 1990, ethnic tensions between Serbs and Croats worsened after the electoral defeat of the government of the Socialist Republic of Croatia by the Croatian Democratic Union (Croatian: Hrvatska demokratska zajednica – HDZ). The Yugoslav People's Army (Serbian: Jugoslovenska Narodna Armija – JNA) confiscated Croatia's Territorial Defence (Croatian: Teritorijalna obrana – TO) weapons to minimize resistance. On 17 August, the tensions escalated into an open revolt of the Croatian Serbs, centred on the predominantly Serb-populated areas of the Dalmatian hinterland around Knin (approximately 60 kilometres (37 miles) north-east of Split), parts of the Lika, Kordun, Banovina and eastern Croatia. In January 1991, Serbia, supported by Montenegro and Serbia's provinces of Vojvodina and Kosovo, unsuccessfully tried to obtain the Yugoslav Presidency's approval for a JNA operation to disarm Croatian security forces. The request was denied and a bloodless skirmish between Serb insurgents and Croatian special police in March prompted the JNA itself to ask the Federal Presidency to give it wartime authority and declare a state of emergency. Even though the request was backed by Serbia and its allies, the JNA request was refused on 15 March. Serbian President Slobodan Milošević, preferring a campaign to expand Serbia rather than to preserve Yugoslavia with Croatia as a federal unit, publicly threatened to replace the JNA with a Serbian army and declared that he no longer recognized the authority of the federal Presidency. The threat caused the JNA to abandon plans to preserve Yugoslavia in favour of expansion of Serbia as the JNA came under Milošević's control. By the end of March, the conflict had escalated with the first fatalities. In early April, leaders of the Serb revolt in Croatia declared their intention to amalgamate the areas under their control with Serbia. These were viewed by the Government of Croatia as breakaway regions.

At the beginning of 1991, Croatia had no regular army. To bolster its defence, Croatia doubled its police numbers to about 20,000. The most effective part of the Croatian police force was 3,000-strong special police comprising twelve battalions organised along military lines. There were also 9,000–10,000 regionally organised reserve police in 16 battalions and 10 companies, but they lacked weapons. In response to the deteriorating situation, the Croatian government established the Croatian National Guard (Croatian: Zbor narodne garde – ZNG) in May by expanding the special police battalions into four all-professional guards brigades. Under Ministry of Defence control and commanded by retired JNA General Martin Špegelj, the four guards brigades comprised approximately 8,000 troops. The reserve police, also expanded to 40,000, was attached to the ZNG and reorganised into 19 brigades and 14 independent battalions. The guards brigades were the only units of the ZNG that were fully equipped with small arms; throughout the ZNG there was a lack of heavier weapons and there was poor command and control structure above the brigade level. The shortage of heavy weapons was so severe that the ZNG resorted to using World War II weapons taken from museums and film studios. At the time, the Croatian weapon stockpile consisted of 30,000 small arms purchased abroad and 15,000 previously owned by the police. To replace the personnel lost to the guards brigades, a new 10,000-strong special police was established.

== Prelude ==
The views of the Croatian leadership on how to deal with the JNA's role in the Croatian Serb revolt gradually evolved between January and September 1991. Croatian President Franjo Tuđman's initial plan was to win European Community (EC) and United States support; so he dismissed advice to seize JNA barracks and storage facilities in the country. This course of action was first advocated by Špegelj in late 1990; he again urged Tuđman to act while the JNA fought Slovenia's TO in the Ten-Day War in June–July 1991. Špegelj's calls were echoed by Šime Đodan, who succeeded Špegelj as Defence Minister in July. Špegelj remained in command of the ZNG.

Tuđman's initial stance was based on his belief that Croatia could not win a war against the JNA. The ZNG was therefore limited to defensive operations, even though the actions of the JNA appeared to be coordinated with Croatian Serb forces. This impression was reinforced by buffer zones established by the JNA after fighting between Croatian Serb militia and the ZNG. The JNA often intervened after the ZNG had lost territory, leaving the Croatian Serbs in control of areas they had captured before the JNA stepped in. The JNA provided some weapons to the Croatian Serbs, although most of their weaponry was sourced from Serbia's TO and the Serbian Ministry of Internal Affairs.

In July 1991, Špegelj and Đodan's advice was supported by a number of Croatian Parliament members. In response, Tuđman dismissed Đodan the same month he was appointed Defence Minister, and Špegelj resigned his command of the ZNG on 3 August. The deteriorating situation in eastern Croatia, including the JNA expulsion of ZNG troops from Baranja, intermittent fighting around Osijek, Vukovar and Vinkovci, increasing losses and the growing conviction that the JNA were actively supporting the Croatian Serb revolt, forced Tuđman to act. On 22 August, he issued an ultimatum to the federal Yugoslav authorities demanding the withdrawal of the JNA to its barracks by the end of the month. The ultimatum stated that if the JNA failed to comply, Croatia would consider it an army of occupation and take corresponding action. On 1 September, the EC proposed a ceasefire and a peace conference was accepted by the Yugoslav Presidency and by Tuđman, despite his earlier ultimatum. The conference started on 7 September, but only four days later, the Croatian member and chair of the presidency, Stjepan Mesić, ordered the JNA to return to its barracks within 48 hours. This order was motivated by Tuđman's concern that the conference would drag on while the ZNG lost territory. Even though the order was opposed by other members of the presidency, it gave Croatia justification to openly confront the JNA.

Prime Minister Franjo Gregurić advised Tuđman to implement Špegelj's plan. According to General Anton Tus, Tuđman ordered the ZNG to capture JNA barracks on 12 September, but rescinded the order the next day. The order was reinstated on 14 September after Tus pleaded with Tuđman to re-authorize action, arguing that the ZNG was running out of time. The same day, the ZNG and the Croatian police blockaded and cut utilities to all JNA facilities it had access to, beginning the Battle of the Barracks. This action comprised blockades of 33 large JNA garrisons in Croatia, and numerous smaller facilities, including border posts, and weapons and ammunition storage depots.

== Order of battle ==
Varaždin was the garrison of the JNA 32nd Corps commanded by Major General Vladimir Trifunović. In addition to the Corps headquarters there were several other JNA facilities in and around the city. The most substantial of these were located in Varaždin itself – the Kalnički partizani barracks where Colonel Berislav Popov's 32nd Mechanised Brigade was based, and the Jalkovečke žrtve barracks of the 32nd Mixed Artillery Regiment, commanded by Lieutenant Colonel Vladimir Davidović. The Corps' area of responsibility extended beyond Varaždin and its immediate surroundings, where further significant combat units were based. The most significant among them were the 32nd Engineer Regiment in Čakovec, the 411th Mixed Antitank Artillery Regiment based in Križevci, the 73rd Motorised Brigade headquartered in Koprivnica, the 265th Mechanised Brigade based in Bjelovar, and the 288th Mixed Antitank Artillery Brigade in Virovitica. In Varaždin itself, the JNA units included approximately 1,000 troops, making the JNA garrison of Varaždin the second largest in Croatia. Despite this, the JNA did not have sufficient number of troops in the area to secure all its facilities.

Croatian forces in and around Varaždin and nearby Čakovec consisted of 640 ZNG troops (including 60 who had been deployed from Zagreb), 100 police, 300 People's Protection (Narodna zaštita) troops and several hundred armed civilians. The ZNG troops were subordinated to the 104th Brigade and to the 5th Battalion of the 1st Guards Brigade – but were lightly armed. Besides small arms, they had only 17 mortars, two 9M14 Malyutka anti-tank guided missile systems, two 12.7-millimetre (0.50 in) anti-aircraft machine guns and four armoured personnel carriers. Initially, command of Croatian forces in the city was not unified and Colonel Želimir Škarec of the General Staff of the Armed Forces of the Republic of Croatia only had a coordination role.

== Timeline ==
=== First hostilities ===
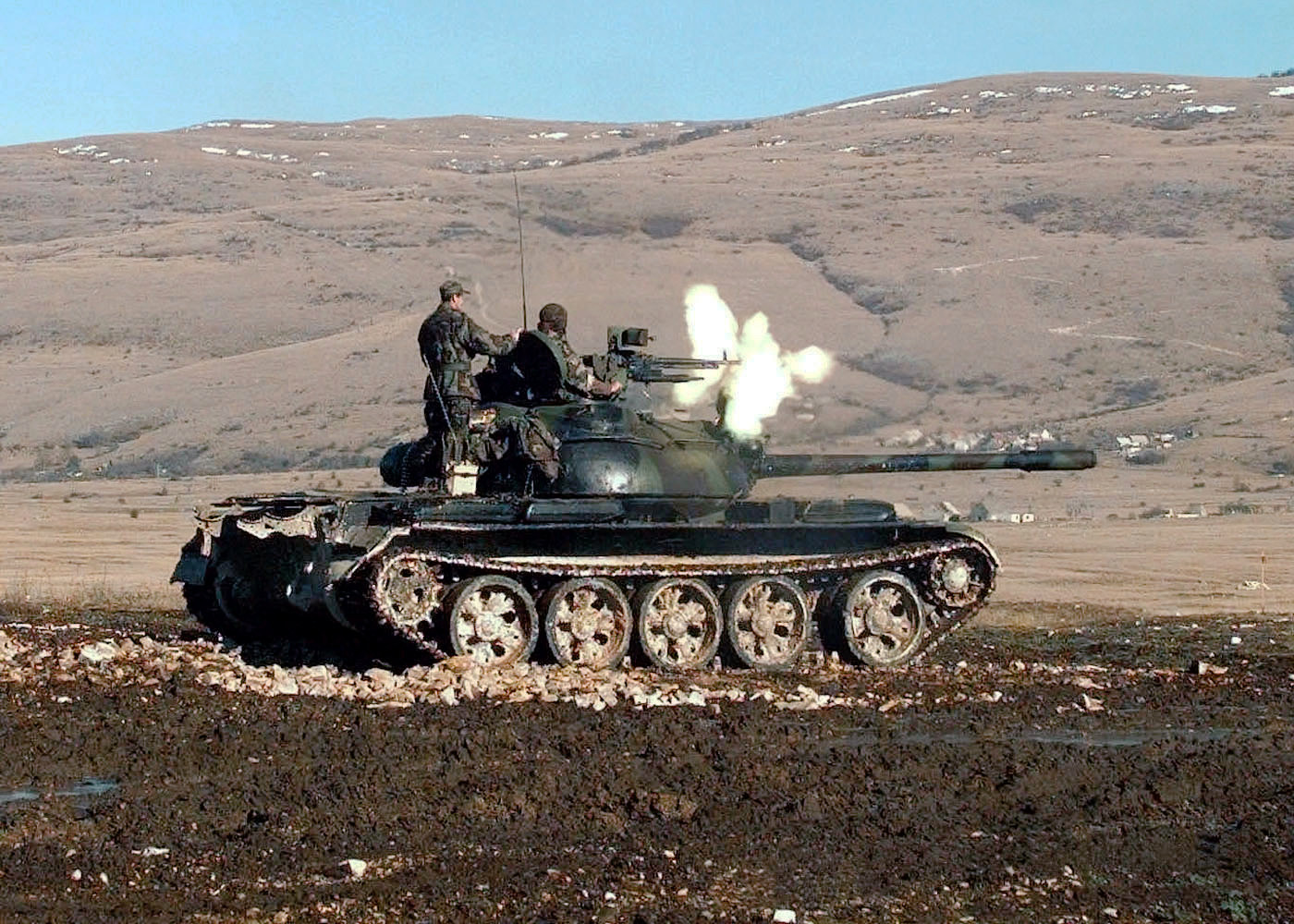
The ZNG captured 74 T-55 JNA tanks from its Varaždin garrison

A blockade of the JNA facilities in and around Varaždin was ordered on 13 September 1991, which took effect the next day when utilities and access to the barracks were cut. In response, the Corps command informed Croatian forces that they could no longer guarantee peace unless utilities were restored and JNA military vehicles were allowed to move freely. On 15 September, the Corps began preparing for the demolition of all minor military facilities which could not be defended. At the same time, negotiations began between the Corps command and civilian authorities in Varaždin. At 15:30, the Yugoslav Air Force attacked the Varaždin Airfield. The strike was intended to disrupt flights of Antonov An-2 agricultural aircraft converted to carry 1.5 tonnes (1.5 long tons; 1.7 short tons) of cargo—transporting weapons from the Hungarian town of Nagykanizsa. The attacking force comprised two planes sortied from Željava Air Base, which broke the sound barrier above Varaždin to produce a sonic boom and bombed the airfield. One bomb destroyed an An-2 on the ground and damaged the runway, while the second landed in a nearby field.

Between 16:50 and 17:07, there was an exchange of small arms fire between the JNA troops in the Corps headquarters and a nearby police checkpoint, and at 17:35 a mortar attack was launched by the 32nd Mechanised Brigade. The mortar fire targeted the police station and surrounding buildings, and an electrical substation in the nearby village of Nedeljanec. The civilian authorities in Varaždin promptly notified the European Community Monitoring Mission of damage to the city. By 16 September, the JNA artillery bombardment of the city had extended to various street intersections and approaches to the Drava bridge on the Varaždin–Čakovec road. The latter was counter-battery fire, targeting ZNG mortars which fired approximately 150 bombs against the JNA during the entire operation. By the end of 16 September 42 JNA officers and soldiers had deserted from the 32nd Mechanised Brigade. The JNA ordered its border guards posted along the Hungarian border from Čakovec to Ludbreg to lay land mines around their facilities, then cross into Hungary and surrender to that country's authorities.

=== Peak of the fighting ===
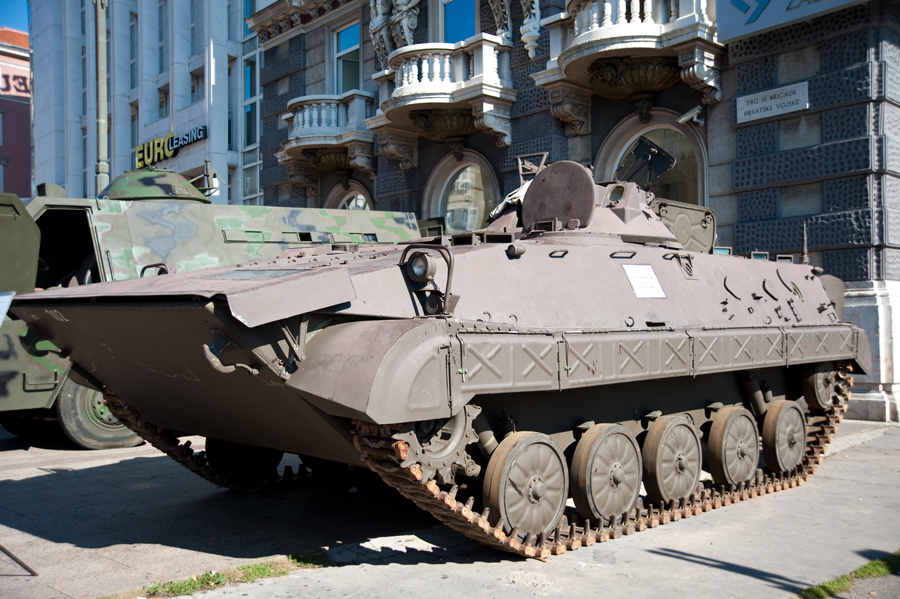
Croatia seized 48 BVP M-80 infantry fighting vehicles from the capture of the JNA barracks in Varaždin.

On 17 September, the commander of the 104th Brigade, Colonel Ivan Rukljić, took command of all Croatian forces in Varaždin. The Yugoslav Air Force attacked an airfield in Čakovec, mimicking the strike carried out in Varaždin a few days earlier. That evening, the heaviest fighting of the siege erupted in Varaždin, and the 104th Brigade reported it was uncertain how long it would be able to maintain the blockades. Croatian forces received additional weapons that day, after the JNA garrisons in Čakovec, Križevci and Virovitica surrendered to the ZNG. In Varaždin itself, corps-level units of the JNA 32nd Corps based at the 15. maj barracks also surrendered to the ZNG that day. The following day, fighting intensified again, as Croatian forces captured several minor JNA facilities in Varaždin itself—leaving the Corps headquarters, the Kalnički partizani barracks and the Jalkovečke žrtve barracks as the only JNA-held military bases in the city. In the course of this fighting, the ZNG suffered one fatality and captured nine JNA officers and 30 soldiers.

On 19 September, Croatian forces managed to interdict radio communications between the 32nd Mechanised Brigade artillery and its artillery observers, and set up their own transmitter to direct JNA artillery fire against the Jalkovečke žrtve barracks. This deception was designed to deceive Davidović into thinking that the ZNG had much greater firepower than it did. The plan worked and when ZNG troops entered the barracks compound that day, the 32nd Mixed Artillery Regiment (four officers and 196 soldiers) surrendered. Late in the evening of 19 September, Croatian police and elements of the 3rd Battalion of the 104th Brigade secured the Varaždinbreg weapons storage facility located in the village of Banjšćina near Varaždin, after its JNA commander surrendered the facility and its garrison of 60 without resistance. The capture of JNA weapons greatly improved the Croatian position in negotiations when trying to convince JNA commanding officers of the 32nd Corps to surrender.

=== Surrender of the JNA garrison ===
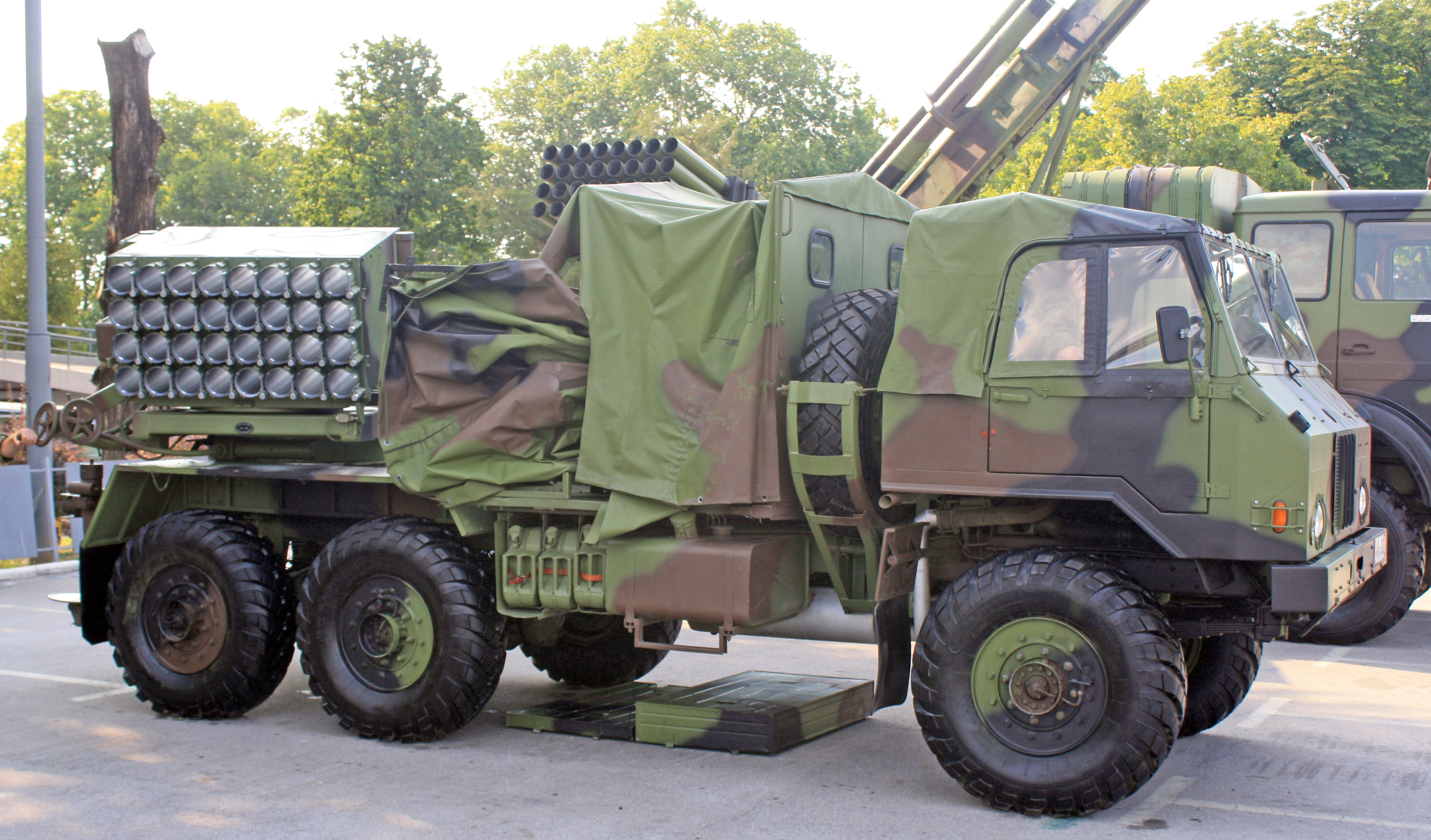
Six M-63 Plamen multiple rocket launchers were captured and added to ZNG weapon stocks

The blockade continued for two more days, with continuing clashes between Croatian and JNA troops. On 21 September, the 32nd Corps found itself in a difficult position. It reported that it could not continue to resist as its weapons and ammunition storage facilities had been lost, and all the barracks had been captured except the base of the 32nd Mechanised Brigade. Furthermore, it noted that there was a possibility that the remaining troops might desert en masse. According to Trifunović, he notified Colonel General Života Avramović, his immediate superior and commander of the 5th Military District, of his intention to surrender. Avramović then told Trifunović to do as he saw fit. A Croatian ultimatum was issued early on 22 September, demanding the surrender of JNA troops in the city, and offering its personnel the chance to leave Croatia "honourably". Trifunović accepted the Croatian terms at 11:00.

== Aftermath ==
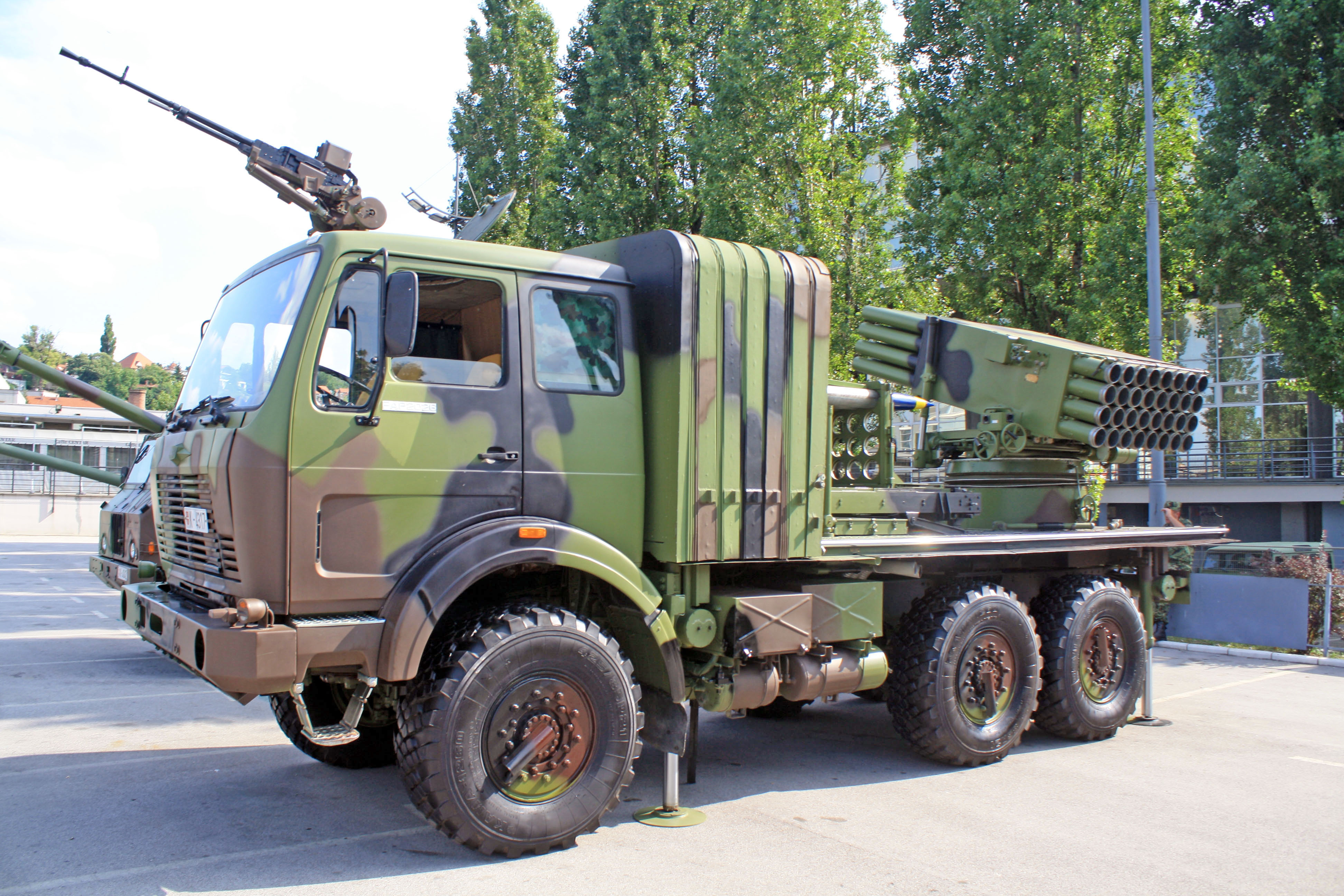
Four JNA M-77 Oganj MRLs were captured by the ZNG in Varaždin.

One JNA officer and one non-commissioned officer were killed during the fighting, and 15 JNA troops were wounded. Croatian forces sustained losses of two killed and 24 wounded. Two civilians were also killed. Approximately 1,000 JNA officers and soldiers surrendered to the ZNG. The officers and their families living in Varaždin, as well as approximately 450 soldiers who wanted to leave Croatia were transported to Serbia in a convoy comprising twelve buses and several passenger cars. The convoy was provided with a police escort and two representatives of the civilian authorities in Varaždin accompanied the convoy as hostages to guarantee its safe passage. One of the hostages was Radimir Čačić, who became Deputy Prime Minister of Croatia 20 years later.

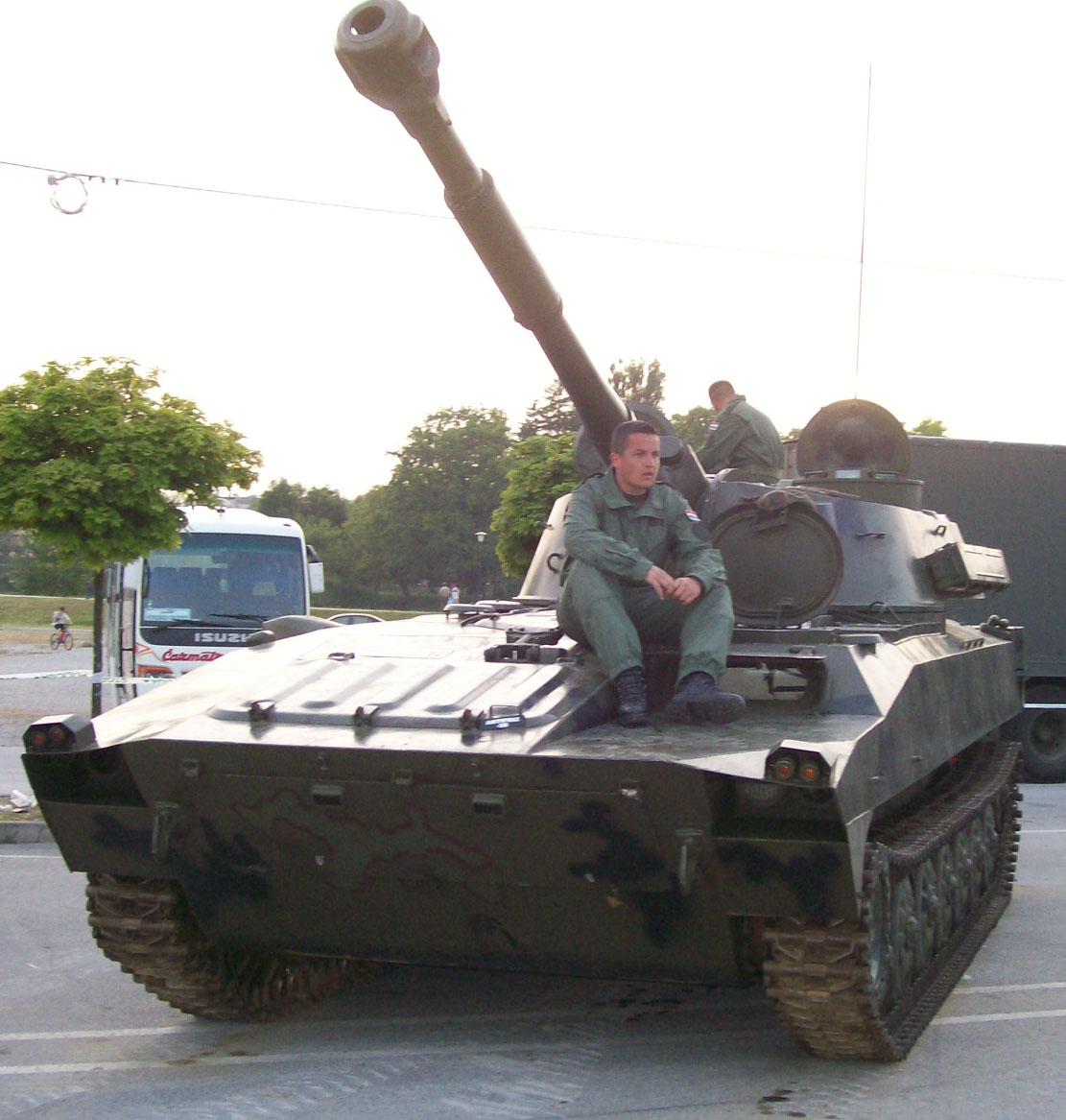
Six JNA 2S1 Gvozdika self-propelled howitzers were a part of the seized JNA equipment

The ZNG captured 74 T-55 tanks, approximately ten special-purpose vehicles (such as PT-76 amphibious light tanks), armoured recovery vehicles, and armoured vehicle-launched bridges, 48 BVP M-80 infantry fighting vehicles, 18 self-propelled anti-aircraft weapons, six 2S1 Gvozdika self-propelled howitzers, six M-63 Plamen and four M-77 Oganj multiple rocket launchers, eighteen 155-millimetre (6.1 in) and twelve 152-millimetre (6.0 in) guns with towing vehicles, approximately 180 artillery pieces below 100-millimetre (3.9 in) calibre, several batteries of 60-millimetre (2.4 in), 82-millimetre (3.2 in) and 120-millimetre (4.7 in) mortars, 25,000 small arms, 250 vehicles and pieces of engineering equipment, a large stock of communication equipment and several hundred thousand tonnes of ammunition. Some of the weapons had been disabled on Trifunović's orders shortly before the surrender. The captured weapons were distributed to units deployed in eastern Slavonia, Lika and Dalmatia, and were also used to equip new ZNG units.

When the last JNA-held barracks and the 32nd Corps headquarters surrendered, only two major JNA bases remained in the area of responsibility of the Corps—Bjelovar and Koprivnica. The JNA's Bjelovar garrison was captured by the ZNG a week later, while its barracks in Koprivnica surrendered a day after that. The capture of the JNA barracks in and around Varaždin, and particularly the storage facilities of the 32nd Corps was very significant for development of Croatian military. The capture of the barracks is celebrated annually in Varaždin, and is locally referred to as "Varaždin's Days of War" (Varaždinski dani rata).

War crimes charges were raised against Trifunović in Croatia, where he was indicted for the deaths of six individuals and the wounding of a further 37, both soldiers and civilians. In 1991, he was tried in absentia by a Croatian court, found guilty and sentenced to 15 years in prison. In 1994, Trifunović was charged with treason by the Yugoslav authorities for surrendering the entire JNA 32nd Corps to the ZNG. He was convicted and sentenced to 11 years in prison. In early 1996, he was pardoned and released, and the government of Yugoslavia paid him €62,000 compensation for spending nearly two years in prison. In 2013, Trifunović formally requested a re-trial in Croatia. He died in January 2017, before proceedings could commence.
