= Stojadin Mirković =

Yugoslav conscript

- Born: 14 January 1972; Gornje Leskovice, SR Serbia, SFR Yugoslavia
- Died: 29 September 1991 (aged 19); Bjelovar, Croatia
- Military career
- Allegiance: Yugoslavia
- Branch: Yugoslav People's Army
- Service years: 1990–1991
- Rank: Soldier
- Nickname: Cole (pronounced [tsôle])
- Conflicts: Croatian War; Battle of the Barracks; Siege of Bjelovar Barracks †
- Awards

Stojadin Mirković (Serbian Cyrillic: Стојадин Мирковић; 14 January 1972 – 29 September 1991) was a Yugoslav People's Army conscript who fought in the war in Croatia. He became known on a wide scale after it was discovered that he died along with Maj. Milan Tepić in the Battle of the Barracks.

== Biography ==
Mirković was born on 14 January 1972 in the village of Gornje Leskovice, municipality of Valjevo, from where, after being drafted, he left on 28 December 1990 to complete his mandatory military service in Banja Luka. After completing training as a military transporter driver, he was transferred to VP 4848/16 in Bjelovar and to the central ammunition depot in the village of Bedenik near Nova Rača, about twenty kilometers from Bjelovar.

After the blockade by Croatian paramilitary formations, Major Milan Tepić was forced to retreat with his soldiers to the warehouse and organize a defense. Not wanting to leave the enemy with weapons with which to kill his soldiers, Tepić blew up the military warehouse and himself on 29 September 1991. On that occasion, Mirković was also killed when his transporter from which he was operating was hit by a M80 Zolja.

Almost four years after his death, his remains were transported from the cemetery in Bjelovar and buried with military honors in his native village on 18 July 1995.

== Legacy ==
In his honor, a bust was unveiled in the courtyard of the Miloš Marković elementary school in Gornje Leskovice, while Mirković was posthumously awarded the city's highest award, the September Charter and the Order of Military Merit in the Field of Defense and Security, 1st Class, for his deed. In 2018, a street in Belgrade was named after Mirković while a bust was erected in Valjevo in 2023.
