= 104th Brigade (Croatia) =

- Active: 1991 – 2008
- Country: Croatia
- Branch: Croatian National Guard
- Type: infantry
- Garrison/HQ: Varaždin

The 104th Brigade (Croatian: 104. brigada) was a unit of the Croatian Army that existed during the Croatian War of Independence.

== History ==
The 104th was formed as part of the Croatian National Guard (Zbor narodne garde) on 8 May 1991, and officially activated as of 2 July 1991. Operations were undertaken in September 1991 as part of blockades of the Yugoslav People's Army at Varaždin, which remains the home of the brigade.

The brigade undertook front line combat duty against Serbian forces in October 1991 and operated there into December 1992, suffering 174 casualties (29 dead). Operations in 1993 resulted in a further 13 casualties (1 dead). Around 12,000 soldiers served in the brigade from 1991 to 1995.

After demobilization, the brigade became a recruit training unit.

=== Operations ===
- Siege of Varaždin Barracks, September 1991
- Kalnik partisan barracks blockade, September 1991
- Bjelovar barracks blockade, 1991
- Nuštar, Slavonia front-line duty, October, 1991
- Lipik-Pakrac front-line duty, November 1991 - July 1992
- Posavina front-line duty, to July 1993
- Operation Flash, 1995
- Operation Storm, 1995

== People ==
- Major Mirko Druško, 2nd Battalion Commander
- Colonel Ivan Matoković, Brigade Commander from 1994
- Major Vjeran Rožić, Brigade Commander 1993 to 1994
- Colonel Ivan Rukljić, Brigade Commander to 15 December 1992

== See also ==
- List of military equipment of Croatia

== Sources ==
- 104th Brigade of Croatian army, Varazdin
