= Battle of Logorište =

1991 battle of the Croatian War of Independence

Coordinates: 45.453689°N 15.559803°E

- Part of the Croatian War of Independence
- Logorište on the map of Croatia. JNA-held area in late December 1991 is highlighted red.
Date	4–6 November 1991
Location	Duga Resa, Croatia
Result	Yugoslavia-SAO Krajina victory: Successful evacuation of the barracks by the Yugoslav People's Army

Belligerents
Croatia	SFR Yugoslavia; SAO Krajina

Commanders and leaders
(Croatia) Izidor Češnjaj (Croatia) Rudolf Brlečić (Croatia) Nedjeljko Katušin	Mirko Raković; Boro Ercegovac

Strength
Unknown	685 (garrison only)

Casualties and losses
31 killed	14 killed 33 wounded
- 14 civilians killed 14 civilians captured

The Battle of Logorište was fought east of Duga Resa and south of Karlovac, Croatia, from 4–6 November 1991 during the Croatian War of Independence, between the Croatian National Guard (Zbor narodne garde – ZNG) and the Yugoslav People's Army (Jugoslovenska Narodna Armija – JNA). The ZNG placed the JNA-held Logorište barracks under a blockade as part of the countrywide Battle of the Barracks, which aimed to pin down JNA units isolated in their bases and force them to surrender weapons and ammunition to the ZNG. However, the JNA garrison broke out from the besieged barracks with part of its stored equipment before the ZNG claimed the vacant base. The breakout was supported by JNA units and SAO Krajina units deployed to lift the blockade of the barracks and other JNA garrisons in Karlovac. A battle ensued as the ZNG attempted to contain advancing JNA units, ending with a ceasefire signed in The Hague.

Although both sides claimed victory, neither achieved all their objectives; the JNA garrison evacuated the Logorište barracks, but Croatian defences elsewhere held. Particularly heavy fighting was reported in the Karlovac suburb of Turanj, identified as the primary axis of the JNA effort. While the JNA removed some weapons and equipment stored in the Logorište barracks, the remaining supplies were removed by the ZNG over a one-week period after the battle.

== Background ==
In 1990, after the electoral defeat of the government of the Socialist Republic of Croatia, ethnic tensions between Croats and Croatian Serbs worsened. The Yugoslav People's Army (Jugoslovenska Narodna Armija – JNA) confiscated the Croatian Territorial Defence Force's (Teritorijalna obrana – TO) weapons to minimize resistance. On 17 August, tensions escalated into an open revolt by the Croatian Serbs centred on the predominantly Serb-populated areas of the Dalmatian hinterland around Knin, parts of Lika, Kordun, Banovina and Slavonia.

After two unsuccessful attempts by Serbia (supported by Montenegro and the Serbian provinces of Vojvodina and Kosovo) to obtain the Yugoslav Presidency's approval for a JNA operation to disarm Croatian security forces in January 1991—and a bloodless skirmish between Serb insurgents and Croatian special police in March—the JNA, supported by Serbia and its allies, asked the federal presidency for wartime powers and the declaration of a state of emergency. The request was denied on 15 March, and the JNA came under the control of Serbian President Slobodan Milošević. Milošević, preferring a campaign to expand Serbia rather than preserve Yugoslavia, publicly threatened to replace the JNA with a Serbian army and declared that he no longer recognized the authority of the federal presidency. The threat caused the JNA to gradually abandon plans to preserve Yugoslavia in favour of Serbian expansion. By the end of March the conflict escalated with its first fatalities, during the Plitvice Lakes incident. The JNA stepped in, supporting the insurgents and preventing the Croatian police from intervening. In early April, leaders of the Serb revolt in Croatia declared their intention to integrate the area under their control with Serbia; this was seen by the Croatian government as an intention to secede from Croatia.

At the beginning of 1991 Croatia had no regular army, and in an effort to bolster its defence the country doubled its police force to about 20,000. The force's most effective component was its 3,000-strong special police, deployed in 12 battalions with a military structure. There were also a 9,000–10,000-strong regionally-organized reserve police, grouped into 16 battalions and 10 companies. The reserve police carried only small arms, and a portion of the force was unarmed. Although the Croatian government responded in May by forming the Croatian National Guard (Zbor narodne garde – ZNG), its development was hampered by a United Nations arms embargo introduced in September. On 12 September the ZNG was ordered to blockade all JNA facilities it could reach, beginning the Battle of the Barracks.

== Prelude ==
In late September and early October 1991, the blockade of JNA barracks in and around Karlovac and Croatian defences in the city were maintained by about 900 police and ZNG troops. The troops were assigned to the 110th Infantry Brigade and the under-strength 3rd Battalion of the 2nd Guards Brigade. The 110th Infantry Brigade, at one-third of its planned strength due to poor organisation and a shortage of weapons, was commanded by Lieutenant Colonel Rudolf Brlečić.

The JNA's Stjepan Milašinčić-Seljo barracks in Logorište, south of Karlovac, was one of the largest weapons-storage facilities in Croatia. The barracks contained weapons and equipment for the 8th Proletarian Motorised Brigade, the 471st Mixed Antitank Artillery Brigade, elements of the logistics battalion of the 580th Mixed Artillery Brigade, an armoured battalion of the 236th Proletarian Motorised Brigade and 200 tonnes of fuel and stockpiled food assigned to the 944th Logistics Base. During the summer of 1990, a mechanised battalion of the 4th Armoured Brigade was moved from Jastrebarsko to the Logorište barracks. When the battalion was deployed to Lika in late March 1991, about 40 men remained at the barracks (whose fortifications were improved). The barracks commander was Lieutenant Colonel Boro Ercegovac, who was also commanding officer of the 8th Proletarian Motorised Brigade.

The 1st Battalion of the ZNG's 110th Infantry Brigade blockaded the barracks on 19 September to contain the JNA and prevent the removal of weapons. The blockade was poorly organised, allowing a pair of tanks to leave the barracks and raid a nearby settlement two days later; however, according to Croatian sources one tank was destroyed during the raid. To relieve blockaded garrisons in the Karlovac area the JNA redeployed the 169th Motorised Brigade from Loznica and three detachments of the TO from Vojnić, assigning them to Operational Group 1 (OG-1). OG-1 attacked Croatian defences on 4 October, reaching the east bank of the Korana River on 8 October. The 169th Motorised Brigade collapsed due to inadequate manpower, and was replaced by the 9th Motorised Brigade (brought in from Serbia) on 15 October.

=== Order of battle ===
According to the JNA an additional 450 troops were deployed to the barracks (despite the blockade) from 22 October to 4 November, primarily tank crews assigned to the 9th Motorised Brigade and two companies of SAO Krajina TO from Vojnić. The reinforcements crossed the Korana River, adjacent to the barracks, and their movements led to several skirmishes. By 4 November, the barracks housed a 685-strong garrison. During the second half of October, the 129th and 137th Infantry Brigades were established in Karlovac and nearby Duga Resa to bolster Croatian defences. The two new brigades were assigned areas of responsibility (AORs) on 29 November by the Karlovac Operational Zone commanding officer, Colonel Izidor Češnjaj; the 110th and 137th Brigade AORs were just south of the Logorište barracks. The 137th Infantry Brigade was commanded by Major Nedjeljko Katušin. The 110th Infantry Brigade deployed three companies of its 1st Battalion north and west of the Logorište barracks, while three companies of its 3rd Battalion were deployed south of the barracks. Further south, three companies of the 3rd Battalion of the 137th Infantry Brigade faced the Korana. The 1/110th Brigade was supported by two companies of police (including an antitank and sniper group of special police reserve troops commanded by Želimir Feitl) in Sv. Doroteja, north of the barracks. The 3/137th Brigade was supported by an additional company of police. The 3rd Battalion of the 2nd Guards Brigade was ordered to redeploy to Banovina; most of its troops were on leave or had left the area, and only a squad remained in the rear of the 137th Infantry Brigade.

== Timeline ==
Map of the battle Korana River 110th/137th Brigade AOR boundary roads

The JNA 5th Military District command instructed OG-1 to relieve blockaded JNA garrisons in the Karlovac and Zagreb areas. During the first stage of the advance, OG-1 intended to reach the Kupa River via Turanj (breaking through the ZNG positions) while the second stage relieved JNA garrisons blockaded in Karlovac. On 2 November OG-1 began artillery bombardment in the Karlovac area, forcing the 2nd Battalion of the 110th Infantry Brigade to abandon its positions in Turanj the following day. The abandoned defences were occupied by elements of the brigade's 1st Battalion.

On 3 November, the ZNG was renamed the Croatian Army (Hrvatska vojska – HV). OG-1 supplemented its orders with instructions to capture the village of Barilović and its surroundings (south of the Logorište barracks) to facilitate the evacuation of the barracks. Anticipating the JNA advance, the General Staff of the Armed Forces of the Republic of Croatia instructed the Karlovac Operational Zone and the 110th Infantry Brigade to capture the Logorište and Jamadol barracks and secure ammunition for HV (whose stock was dwindling). Brlečić ordered the police force, commanded by Feitl, to capture the barracks that night; Feitl refused, and the order was rescinded by Češnjaj. The JNA artillery bombarded Karlovac during the night of 3–4 November.

=== 4 November ===
The breakout from the Logorište barracks began on 4 November at 7:30 a.m., after an hour-long artillery bombardment and airstrikes on battalion and company command posts. The JNA simultaneously attacked HV defences at Turanj (further north), threatening Karlovac. The breakout was commanded by the OG-1 chief of staff, Colonel Mirko Raković.

While most of the JNA garrison in the Logorište barracks remained in place, a group of 10 to 16 tanks deployed south (without significant resistance) toward the villages of Belajske Poljice and Belaj. The armoured force went through Belaj before it was stopped at Gornji Velemerić and about 1 kilometre (0.62 miles) north of the village of Carevo Selo by elements of the 2nd Guards Brigade and the 137th Infantry Brigade. The JNA force retreated to Belaj after losing two tanks, mounting another attack on the road to Barilović. The four tanks dispatched to Barilović were also stopped by 137th Brigade troops before reaching their objective. By evening the 137th Infantry Brigade was reinforced by two companies redeployed from Generalski Stol and Erdelj, elements of the 3rd Battalion of the 2nd Guards Brigade, one tank, three armoured personnel carriers (APCs) and an antitank missile system to contain the JNA advance. During the night of 4–5 November, the civilian population was evacuated.

A secondary force of four JNA tanks, supported by infantry, was deployed from the Logorište barracks to secure high ground north and east of the barracks and protect the flank of the armoured force in Belaj. According to the HV, advancing troops were met by the 2nd Company of the 3rd Battalion of the 110th Brigade (supported by a T-55 tank) in Mala Vinica after the JNA force secured its immediate objectives. The JNA lost three tanks and a truck in the clash. According to them one tank was destroyed and another damaged, forcing the remaining two to retreat to the barracks. The secondary force was limited to within 400 metres (1,300 feet) from Belajske Poljice after the HV secured Vinica Hill, which was attacked by a Yugoslav Air Force Mikoyan-Gurevich MiG-21 at 2:00 p.m.

The Karlovac Operational Zone did not assist the 137th Infantry Brigade, instead directing subordinated units to lift JNA sieges of Slunj and Saborsko and securing the Karlovac–Slunj road. This prompted Katušin to request help from Zagreb Operational Zone commander Colonel Stjepan Mateša. Mateša, a native of Duga Resa, ordered the 7th Brigade of the Croatian TO to deploy a battalion to Karlovac. Although the General Staff approved the order (instructing the 8th Brigade of the Croatian TO to add one of its battalions), no 8th Brigade troops were sent.

=== 5 November ===
The JNA, warned about reinforcements to the 137th Infantry Brigade, abandoned its plan to advance to Barilović. It reoriented its efforts to reach the Korana Bridge in the village of Malići, down the road from Gornji Velemerić and Carevo Selo (where its tanks were stopped the day before). The battle resumed in the morning when JNA tanks (supported by the Yugoslav Air Force, artillery and multiple rocket launchers) broke through positions held by the 2nd Guards Brigade at 1:00 p.m., reaching Carevo Selo before they were stopped again by the HV. Shortly afterwards, the 2nd Battalion of the 7th Brigade arrived from Zagreb to Duga Resa and were attached to the 137th Infantry Brigade. One company of the battalion was deployed to Vinica Hill, and a second was deployed west of Carevo Selo (where it relieved troops from the 2nd Guards Brigade).

The 110th Infantry Brigade assigned secondary importance to the fighting around the Logorište barracks, since it was struggling to hold its positions at Turanj (where the HV estimated a two-battalion-strong attack was in progress, with artillery and air support). At 5:00 a.m. the Vinica Hill positions were reinforced by the Sports Company (composed of Zagreb University Faculty of Kinesiology students) and a platoon of 82-millimetre (3.2 in) mortars attached to the 3rd Battalion of the 110th Infantry Brigade. The battalion was tasked with blocking the Logorište–Belajske Poljice road leading south from the Logorište barracks and capturing Belajske Poljice by noon.

Since there were only 40 trained drivers in the Logorište barracks, Boro Ercegovac ordered soldiers who had never operated military vehicles to drive in a column starting from the barracks under fire at 3:30 p.m. As the column advanced south towards Malići, elements of the 110th Infantry Brigade retreated from the village of Zastinja (on the right bank of the Korana River). The evacuating JNA column sustained casualties, although it was supported by the 9th Motorised Brigade and two detachments of the SAO Krajina TO from Vojnić. The SAO Krajina TO were later accused of killing civilians in the area.

=== 6 November ===
During the night of 5–6 November, fighting died down after a ceasefire was brokered in The Hague. The lull was used by the 137th Infantry Brigade to extract its encircled troops and civilians near the Korana River, east of Malići. The JNA column began moving south again at dawn; it reached Malići at about 9:00 a.m., crossed the Korana River (over the village bridge and a pontoon bridge) by 11:00 and proceeded to Vojnić. Shortly afterwards, the Logorište barracks and its surroundings were secured by the HV.

== Aftermath ==
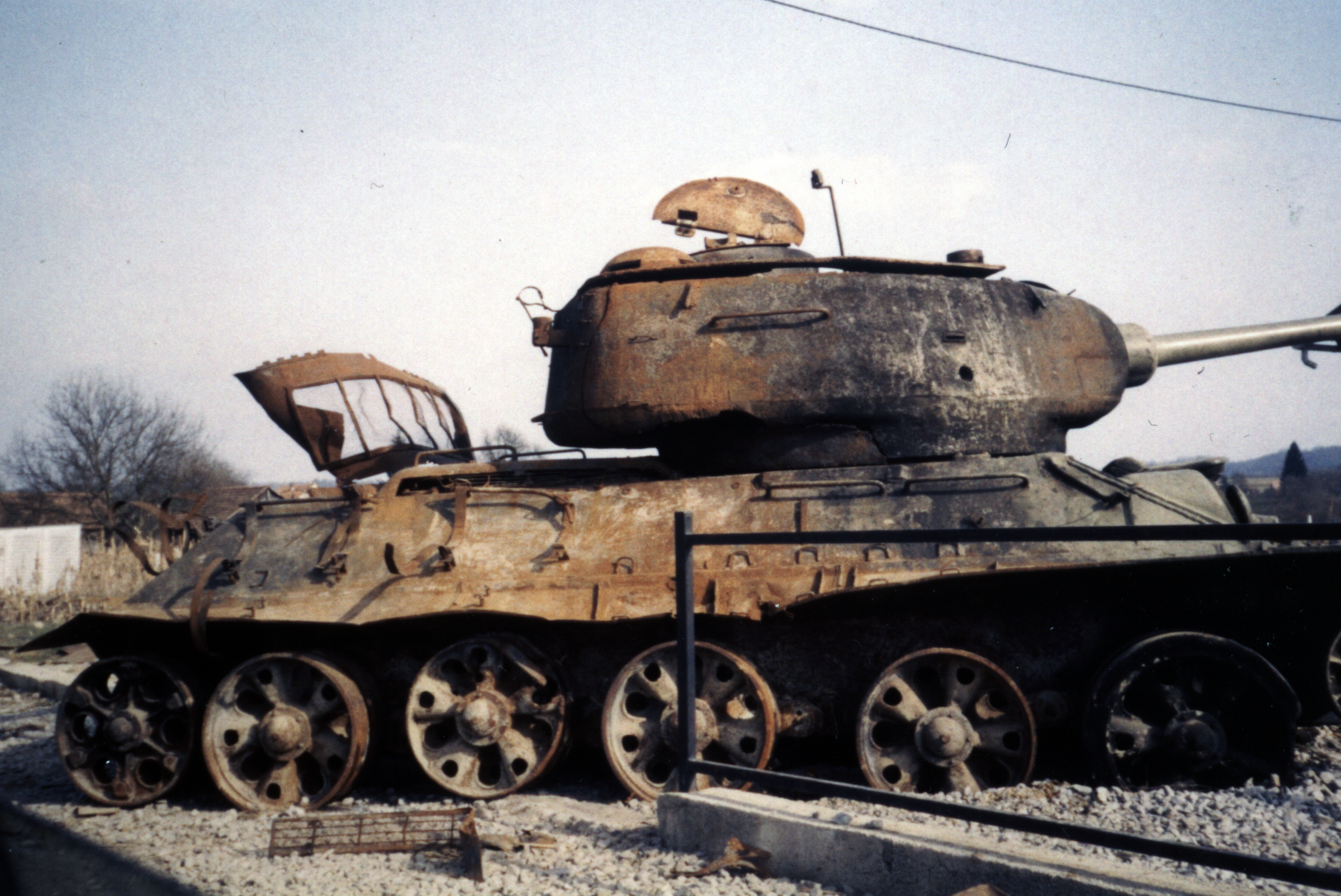
T-34 tank destroyed in fighting near Karlovac

Both sides claimed victory after the battle, with the JNA hailing the evacuation of the garrison as its greatest success. However, they achieved only part of their objectives; the JNA failed to secure the area surrounding the barracks or remove all the weapons and equipment in it, and the planned coordinated advance against Turanj also failed. Croatian forces failed in their primary objective: containing the garrison. Nonetheless, the JNA threat from the Logorište barracks was removed (freeing up forces assigned to the blockade of the barracks) and a large number of weapons were captured.

The 137th Infantry Brigade had 17 fatalities in the battle, and the 2nd Guards Brigade had one. The 110th Infantry Brigade had 14 killed and 26 wounded, but the brigade sustained most of its casualties at Turanj rather than Logorište. The JNA had 14 dead and 33 wounded troops. In addition, 14 civilians were killed and 14 captured and held by the JNA and the SAO Krajina TO. One prisoner died in captivity, and the remainder were later exchanged. Seven of the exchanged prisoners had been severely injured, and died shortly after the exchange. The Central Intelligence Agency estimated that the JNA lost most of its tanks which had been housed in the Logorište barracks.

The JNA evacuated 21 T-55 tanks, nine T-34s, an armoured recovery vehicle, an armoured vehicle-launched bridge, ten APCs (including an armoured command vehicle) and 50 vehicles carrying military equipment. Elements of the 110th Infantry Brigade entered the Logorište barracks on the morning of 6 November, removing some of the military hardware in the barracks before pulling out at 1:00 p.m. after being informed that the JNA was planning an artillery attack. Captured equipment continued to be removed from the barracks until 13 November.

=== Command-system failure ===
The destruction of property caused outrage in Duga Resa, largely directed at Nedjeljko Katušin (who fled for his life to Karlovac and then to Zagreb Operational Zone headquarters on the morning of 6 November). The 110th Infantry Brigade blamed the 137th Brigade for all mistakes, including the breakout from the barracks (which occurred in the brigade's AOR). Izidor Češnjaj also blamed Katušin. However, Katušin was supported by the General Staff and was soon appointed commanding officer of the 140th Infantry Brigade based in Jastrebarsko. In fact, Croatian command and control systems failed (especially the Karlovac Operational Zone command, in the immediate vicinity of the battlefield). Communications were poor, and the zone command issued no instructions to the troops fighting near Logorište. The 110th Infantry Brigade was focused on the fighting at Turanj, paying little attention to Logorište, and the 137th Infantry Brigade made poor use of reinforcements deployed from Zagreb. The JNA command was more effective, probably because of the proximity of its command post on Šanac Hill, 500 metres (1,600 feet) away (permitting direct observation of part of the battlefield).

=== War crimes trial ===
Croatian authorities charged two former members of the SAO Krajina TO with shooting two HV soldiers who had tried to surrender to the JNA on 4 November. One of the two was arrested in October 2010, and was convicted and sentenced to nine years in prison in November 2013.
