= Hrgovljani =

- Neighbourhood
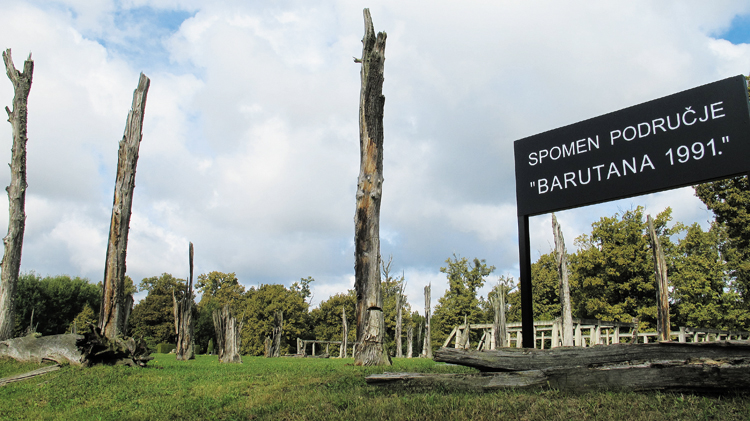
- The Barutana Memorial area, located in Hrgovljani
- Interactive map of Hrgovljani
- Location of Hrgovljani in Croatia
- Coordinates: 45°55′32″N 16°49′35″E
- Country: Croatia
- Region: Croatia proper
- County: Bjelovar-Bilogora County
- Municipality: Bjelovar
- Time zone: UTC+1 (CET)
  - Summer (DST): UTC+2 (CEST)

Hrgovljani are a neighborhood and former rural settlement within the city of Bjelovar, northwest of the city center along a road connecting Bjelovar with Kapela, Zrinski Topolovac and Koprivnica.

Hrgovljani are most significant for being the location of the former Barutana ammunition depot, which was detonated by Milan Tepić, a Yugoslav People's Army major on September 29, 1991, following the Siege of Bjelovar Barracks.

== History ==
In the recent past, Hrgovljani were a rural settlement in the Bjelovar area. They were established at the end of the Ottoman invasions and with the return of the Christian population in the 17th century. On the map of the Josephinian Land Survey in 1774, the settlement was listed as Dorf Hergovlany. In a record published in Buda by János Lipszky in 1808, it was listed as Hergovlyani.
