= Milan Tepić =

Major in the Yugoslav People's Army (1957–1991)

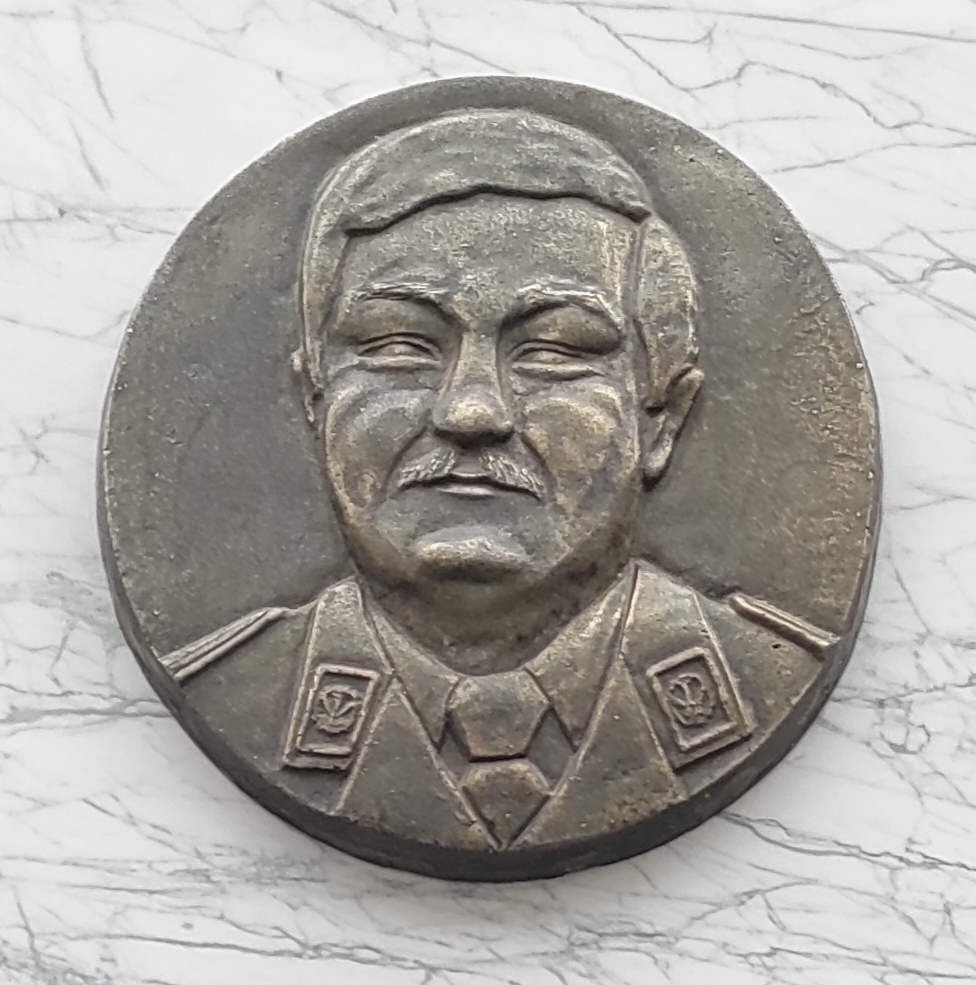
- A plaque in Banja Luka commemorating Tepić
- Born: 26 January 1957; Bosanska Dubica, PR Bosnia and Herzegovina, Yugoslavia
- Died: 29 September 1991 (aged 34); Bjelovar, Croatia
- Burial place: Miroševac Cemetery, Zagreb, Croatia (disputed)
- Military career
- Allegiance: (Socialist Federal Republic of Yugoslavia) SFR Yugoslavia
- Branch: Yugoslav People's Army
- Service years: 1980–1991
- Rank: Major
- Conflicts: Yugoslav Wars; Croatian War of Independence; Battle of the Barracks; Siege of Bjelovar Barracks †
- Awards: Order of the People's Hero

Milan Tepić (Serbian Cyrillic: Милан Тепић; 26 January 1957 – 29 September 1991) was a major in the Yugoslav People's Army during the Croatian War of Independence.

In September 1991, Tepić was tasked with defending an ammunition storage in the village of Hrgovljani just outside Bjelovar. After the defeat of the city's defenders in the Siege of Bjelovar Barracks, Tepić ordered the evacuation of the storage facility while staying behind himself. He then detonated an explosive charge to prevent the capture of the stored ammunition, weapons, and other equipment, killing himself and eleven Croatian soldiers in the process.

== Aftermath ==
Major Milan Tepić was declared a National Hero of Yugoslavia. He was the last person that received this title. In Croatia he is considered a war criminal because his action threatened damage to the town of Bjelovar.

Streets in Belgrade, Banja Luka, Kozarska Dubica Vršac, Zrenjanin, and Sremska Mitrovica are named after him. There is also a monument of Milan Tepić in his street in Belgrade. One street in Novi Sad was also named after him until being changed in 2004. In Republika Srpska the Medal of Major Milan Tepić awarded for bravery is named after him.

== See also ==
- Stevan Sinđelić, a soldier who did a similar act almost 200 years prior during the First Serbian Uprising
- Stojadin Mirković, a soldier who was killed alongside Tepić
