= Martin Špegelj =

Croatian general (1927–2014)

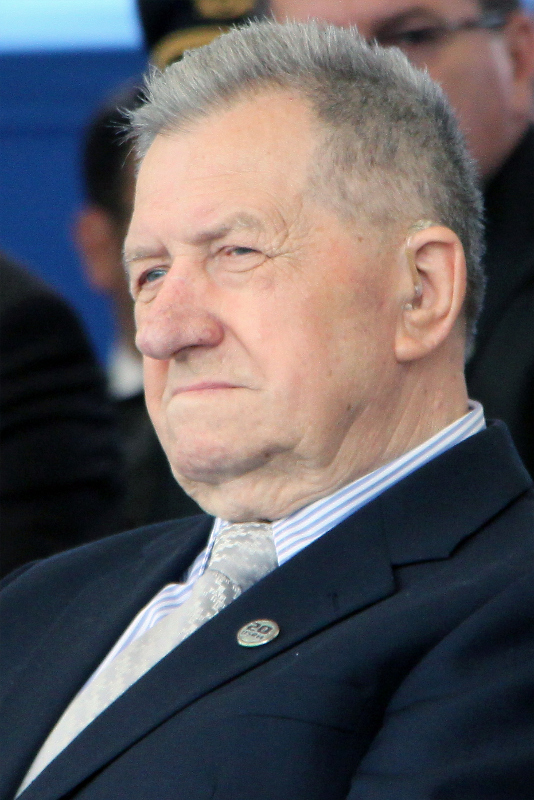
- Martin Špegelj 2011

Minister of Defence
- In office 24 August 1990 – 2 July 1991
- President: Franjo Tuđman
- Prime Minister: Stjepan Mesić; Josip Manolić
- Preceded by: Petar Kriste
- Succeeded by: Šime Đodan

Personal details
- Born: 11 November 1927 Pitomača, Kingdom of Serbs, Croats and Slovenes (modern Croatia)
- Died: 11 May 2014 (aged 86) Zagreb, Croatia
- Party: League of Communists of Yugoslavia (until 1990)

Military service
- Allegiance: Yugoslav Partisans (1941–1945); Yugoslavia (1945–1989); Croatia (1990–1992)
- Branch/service: Yugoslav Ground Forces; Croatian Armed Forces
- Years of service: 1941–1989; 1990–1992
- Rank: Colonel General (JNA); General of the Army (HV)
- Commands: Commander of 5th Army District JNA; Croatian Defence Minister; Chief of General Staff HV
- Battles/wars: World War II; Croatian War of Independence

Martin Špegelj (11 November 1927 – 11 May 2014) was a Croatian army general and politician who served as the second defense minister of Croatia and, later, the chief of staff of the newborn Croatian army and inspector-general of the army. His efforts to organize and equip the army from scratch were seen as instrumental in helping Croatia survive the first year of the Croatian War of Independence. Partly owing to disagreements with president Franjo Tuđman, he retired in 1992, after the war froze with the permanent ceasefire at the end of 1991.

== Early life ==
Martin Spegelj was born 11 November 1927 in Stari Gradac, Pitomača. He was a partisan soldier during World War II. Eventually, he rose to become General of the 5th Yugoslav Army (JNA) Army District based in Zagreb, Croatia.

After the first free elections in Croatia in 1990, he became second Defence Minister. Afterwards he served as head of the Croatian National Guard (ZNG).

== Špegelj Tapes ==
At the onset of the war in Croatia in mid 1990, the Croatian Serbs orchestrated an armed rebellion (known as the Log Revolution), refusing to accept Croatian government authority. As they were supported by the JNA (first covertly, then openly), Croatian forces were poorly armed, so Špegelj undertook a campaign of acquiring arms through the black market community, importing weapons from former Warsaw Pact countries like Hungary and Romania.

He was caught on tape in October 1990 talking to an assistant who was actually an undercover KOS operative. At the time, war in Croatia had not started yet. In the conversations, Špegelj talks of arming Croatians in preparation for secession of Croatia and the impending civil war.

The so-called Špegelj tapes were turned into a documentary film by Zastava military film center and aired in January 1991 to the larger Yugoslav public. They were made public in order to bolster the attack of the Belgrade government against the newly elected Croatian government.

The Croatian leadership, including the main "actors" themselves, initially quickly dismissed the tapes as fake, claiming that the presumably innocuous videotaped conversations were subsequently dubbed. Their authenticity, however, was later confirmed by Stipe Mesić, the president of Croatia, who was one of the first on the Croatian side to admit that the tapes were authentic, although he claimed some of the sentences were taken out of context.

The JNA leadership in Belgrade wanted Špegelj to face trial for treason for this. As a result of the affair, and to calm tensions, Tuđman dismissed him from his post. Fearing for his life, Špegelj fled to Austria, where he remained for several months.

== Return to Croatia ==
Considering the rising tensions and the fall of first deaths of the impending war, Špegelj was persuaded to return to Croatia to become the chief of staff of the new army that was in the process of forming.

When the Slovenian War occurred in June 1991, Špegelj advocated activating the joint defence plan, which would put Croatia into war against the JNA by attacking its army barracks in Croatia (Špegelj's plan). However, Tuđman feared confrontation and refused to support the Slovenes.

Špegelj was then made inspector-general of the Croatian army.

Only several months later, full-scale war broke out, and Špegelj's plan for attacking JNA's army barracks in Croatia was implemented and resulted in the Battle of the Barracks, bringing much-needed heavy weapons to Croatia.

The war in Croatia entered a phase of lower intensity after the signing of a UN-brokered ceasefire at the start of 1992. Špegelj then officially retired in early 1993.

== Post-war and criticism ==
Following the war, Špegelj became a fierce critic of Tuđman's politics, accusing him and his followers of war profiteering. In 2001, he published his autobiography, in which he was very critical of the Tuđman's HDZ and its political maneuverings, which he argued needlessly escalated the war. He also accused them of supporting Bosnian Croat separatism, which led to their conflict with the Bosniaks during the Bosnian War.

Špegelj was in turn criticized by pro-Tuđman elements of the Croatian military, notably Davor Domazet-Lošo, who considers that the June 1991 Slovenian War was just an excuse to draw Croatia into the conflict.

Political offices
Preceded by Petar Kriste	Croatian Minister of Defence; August 24, 1990 – July 2, 1991	Succeeded by Šime Đodan
