= Šime Đodan =

Croatian politician

Šime Đodan (27 December 1927 – 2 October 2007) was a Croatian politician, a two-term Member of Parliament who also briefly served as the 3rd Minister of Defense of Croatia in 1991.

== Personal life ==
Šime Đodan was born on 27 December 1927 in the village of Rodaljce (part of Benkovac), in the Kingdom of Serbs, Croats and Slovenes.

Đodan graduated from the Faculty of Law at University of Zagreb in 1960. In 1965, Đodan obtained his doctorate from the Faculty of Economics, which is also located in Zagrab He served as a member of the presidency and economic secretary of Matica hrvatska from 1967 until 1971.

He was sentenced to six years in a Yugoslav prison for his collaboration during the Croatian Spring. He went on to become a professor at the Faculty of Law in Zagreb in 1991.

Đodan published a number of books concerning economics. He topics included the economic situation of Croatia, the production of goods and services, and economic development.

== Politics ==
Šime Đodan served in the Croatian parliament for two terms. His first term was from 1990 until 1992 and his second term extended from 1992 until 1995.

Đodan briefly served as the Croatian Minister of Defense from 2 July 1991 until 17 July 1991.

He served as president of the Matica hrvatska from 1991 to 1992 and as a member of the presidency of the HDZ.

His political life was marked with controversial rhetoric, most infamously an August 1991 remark in Sinj about the Serbs having "smaller brains" and "pointy heads".

== Death ==
Šime Đodan died on 2 October 2007 at the age of 79 in a hospital in Dubrovnik, Croatia, after a long illness. His funeral was held on 5 October 2007 in Dubrovnik.

Political offices
Preceded by Martin Špegelj	Croatian Minister of Defence; 2 July 1991 – 17 July 1991	Succeeded by Luka Bebić
