= Croatian Special Police order of battle in 1991–1995 =

Special police
- Shoulder sleeve insignia
- Founded: 17 August 1990
- Country: Croatia
- Role: Special operations
- Size: up to 3,100 troops (1991–1995)
- Part of: Ministry of the Interior
- Engagements: Croatian War of Independence

Commanders
- Notable commanders: Mladen Markač

The order of battle of the Croatian Special Police Units (Croatian: Specialne Jedinice Policije, SJP) in 1991–1995 included up to 30 individual special forces units subordinated to the Ministry of the Interior. The special police was created around the Ministry of the Interior's existing airborne special forces unit following an open revolt of the Croatian Serbs against the Government of Croatia in August 1990. It further developed with the increasing involvement of the Yugoslav People's Army in the conflict, supporting the Croatian Serbs. The conflict escalated into the Croatian War of Independence in 1991. The special police took part in the first clashes of the war in Pakrac and at the Plitvice Lakes. As Croatia had no army, the 3,000-strong special forces became the country's most effective fighting force.

Even though several special police units were transformed into the Croatian National Guard (later renamed the Croatian Army) in 1991, the special police continued to operate throughout the war as special forces units supporting virtually all army operations. The last large deployment of the special police in the war occurred in Operation Storm in August 1995, when the force contributed 3,100 troops to the offensive. During the war, the special police units lost 179 troops killed, 790 wounded and 14 missing.

The Special Police of the Republic of Croatia is the name for the special units of the Croatian police in charge of performing tasks in the fight against all forms of terrorism, i.e. in resolving hostage situations, kidnappings, the most serious forms of public disorder and arrests of armed individuals and groups in special conditions.

== Establishment ==
In 1990, following the electoral defeat of the socialist government of Croatia by the Croatian Democratic Union (HDZ) representing a nationalist programme, ethnic tensions between Croats and Croatian Serbs worsened. The Yugoslav People's Army (Jugoslavenska narodna armija – JNA) believed Croatia would use the Croatian Territorial Defence Force's (Teritorijalna obrana – TO) equipment to build its own army and confront the JNA itself. In order to minimize the expected resistance, the JNA confiscated the TO weapons. On 17 August, the tensions escalated into an open revolt of the Croatian Serbs against the Croatian Government, centred on the predominantly Serb-populated areas in Croatia—the Dalmatian hinterland around Knin, and various parts of the Lika, Kordun, Banovina and Slavonia regions. The JNA increasingly supported the Croatian Serb insurgents. The JNA stepped into the conflict, gradually increasing its support to the Croatian Serb insurgents.

Croatia had no regular army at the beginning of 1991. In an effort to bolster its defence, Croatia doubled its police personnel to about 20,000. The most effective part of the force was the 3,000-strong special police, deployed in twelve battalions, adopting special forces military organisation.

The first special police unit established in the 1990s was the Lučko Anti-Terrorist Unit (ATU). Its ranks were largely filled through the selection of police officers trained in Zagreb in 1990. A small number of other personnel were drawn from a special forces unit of the Croatian Ministry of the Interior that existed before the 1990s. Marko Lukić was the first commanding officer of the Lučko ATU.

Special police were visually distinguished by the gradual introduction of a green uniform with a shoulder patch worn on the right sleeve. Officially referred to as Sword and Lightning,(Mač i munja) the design of the Croatian special police shoulder sleeve insignia was inspired by the US Army Special Forces insignia.

In late 1991, the Ministry of the Interior established the Special Police Department to facilitate efficient command and control of the special police. It was reorganised into the Special Police Sector of the ministry in 1994 due to the expanding scope of its operations, including planning and oversight of training processes. The Joint Special Police Force framework was set up by the General Staff of the Armed Forces of the Republic of Croatia to integrate the special police into military operations. In major offensives, such as Operation Storm, when the force fielded 3,100 troops, the special police was directly subordinated to the General Staff of the Armed Forces.

== Fielded units ==
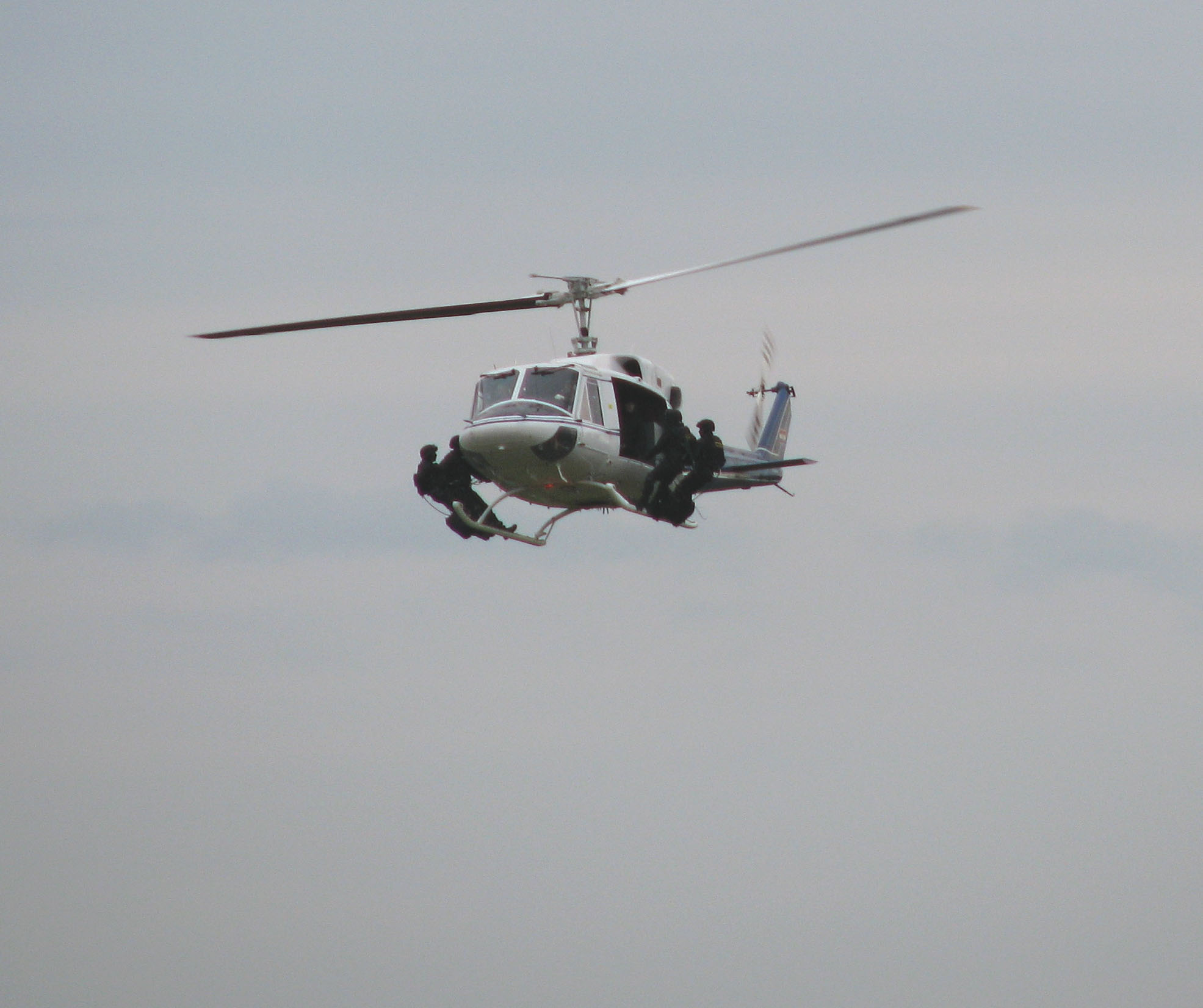
Lučko ATU members transported by a police AB-212 helicopter

The Special Police Airborne Unit, using three helicopters, was deployed on 17 August 1990 to quell a Croatian Serb insurrection in and around Knin. Established in 1968, it was the only combat capable unit of the Croatian military at that time. En route, two Yugoslav Air Force fighters intercepted the helicopters and forced them to land in Ogulin. The day is now considered to be the date when the first unit of the Croatian special police was founded. Following the incident, additional special police units were set up, the bulk of which were formed between September 1990 and September 1991.

The special police subsequently took part in all military operations in the Croatian War of Independence, sustaining losses of 179 troops killed, 790 wounded and 14 missing. Personnel of all units directly subordinated to the Ministry of the Interior were transferred to the Croatian National Guard (Zbor narodne garde – ZNG) by 15 May 1991, when four infantry brigades were established to replace the special police units disbanded in the process. A part of the force was transferred to the Zrinski Battalion—the first special forces unit of the ZNG established around former French Foreign Legion personnel on 18 May. The Airborne Unit, the Lučko ATU and the regionally organised units remained active throughout the war.

Units directly subordinated to the Ministry of the Interior
Unit	Established	Notes
Airborne Unit	1968	The unit was deployed on 17 August 1990 in response to the Log Revolution, and the date is commemorated since as the day of the unit's formation. The unit also supported the Croatian Army (HV) during the Croatian War of Independence, including Operation Maslenica. During that period, the unit was commanded by Mladen Veselić. As of 2013, the unit is based at the Lučko Airport in suburban Zagreb, as it was during the war. It sustained no fatalities during the war.
Lučko ATU	7 September 1990	The unit initially consisted of 225 volunteers, although a total of 350 troops served in the unit at various points of the war. During that time, the unit lost 24 troops killed, while 52 others were severely wounded. The Lučko ATU fought in the first skirmishes with Croatian Serb forces in Pakrac and at the Plitvice Lakes, and in the battles near Dubrovnik, Maslenica, Medak Pocket and during Operations Flash and Storm. Seven Croatian generals were members of the Lučko ATU before transferring to the army: Mladen Markač, Mirko Norac, Miljenko Filipović, Ante Roso, Stanko Sopta, Slavko Butorac and Željko Sačić. Markač replaced Lukić as the unit's commanding officer in late 1991. On 14 February 1994, Markač assumed overall command of the special police.
Tuškanac	1 October 1990	The Tuškanac Special Police Unit (SPU), nicknamed "Special Task Unit", was based in Tuškanac area of Zagreb. It was initially commanded by Ivan Nađ.
Rakitje	5 October 1990	The Rakitje SPU was based in the village of Rakitje near Zagreb. It was initially commanded by Darko Rukavina, but he was replaced by Josip Lucić in February 1991. The unit soon became the core from which the 1st Guards Brigade of the ZNG developed. In 2003, Lucić became chief of the General Staff of the Armed Forces of the Republic of Croatia.
Valbandon / Pionirski grad	8 October 1990	The Valbandon SPU was formed through a training course held in Valbandon near Pula. The unit was initially under the command of Dane Trkulja and consisted of 720 troops. It was moved from Valbandon to the Dubrava area of Zagreb on 17 December 1990 and renamed the Pionirski grad SPU, after the new base. Besides the Pionirski grad barracks, elements of the unit were based in the Sljeme Peak, Nova Ves, Markuševec and Tuškanac areas of Zagreb.
Kumrovec	21 November 1990	The Kumrovec SPU was initially commanded by Neven Martić. The unit was associate with another special police's units and took part in fighting in Pakrac 1 March 1991. Unit SJP Kumrovec supported the special police's recapture of the Plitvice Lakes on 31 March 1991 by securing the Ljubovo Pass between the lakes and the city of Gospić and area of Plitvice Lakes to protect the flank of the main advance of the day. In June 1991, the unit is divided and one part -150 troops was moved to Petruševac beside Zagreb and was part of an established 2nd Guards Brigade and 150 troops were moved to Split and was part of establish 4th Guards Brigade, in time of re-organization the unit was transferred to Sljeme Peak north of Zagreb. Twenty-seven of the unit's original 350 personnel were reassigned to the Zrinski Battalion of the ZNG as the first troops of the special forces battalion commanded by Miljenko Filipović and Ante Roso. .
Sljeme	6 February 1991	The Sljeme SPU was based at Sljeme Peak for four months until the unit was disbanded in June 1991 after its members were transferred to new special police units established in most of the counties of Croatia. Once the Sljeme SPU was disbanded, its base at Sljeme was taken over by the Kumrovec SPU and ZNG special forces. The unit fought in March 1991 at the Plitvice Lakes. The first commander of the unit was Slavko Butorac.
Vinica	8 April 1991	The Vinica SPU, initially commanded by Zdravko Kuzelj, was based in the Vinica Training Centre near Varaždin. On 30 April, approximately 200 troops were transferred from the Vinica SPU to a newly established special police unit in Erdut. The Vinica SPU received additional personnel, before it was reformed into a battalion of the 1st Guards Brigade.
Erdut	30 April 1991	The Erdut SPU was formed from 200 troops transferred from the Vinica SPU and new personnel at the Erdut Training Centre. It was under command of Branko Lanšćak. Part of the unit left Erdut and transferred to other special police units, while the remainder of the Erdut SPU was added to the 3rd Guards Brigade of the ZNG. Croatian forces lost control of Erdut to the JNA on 3 July 1991.

=== Regionally organised units ===
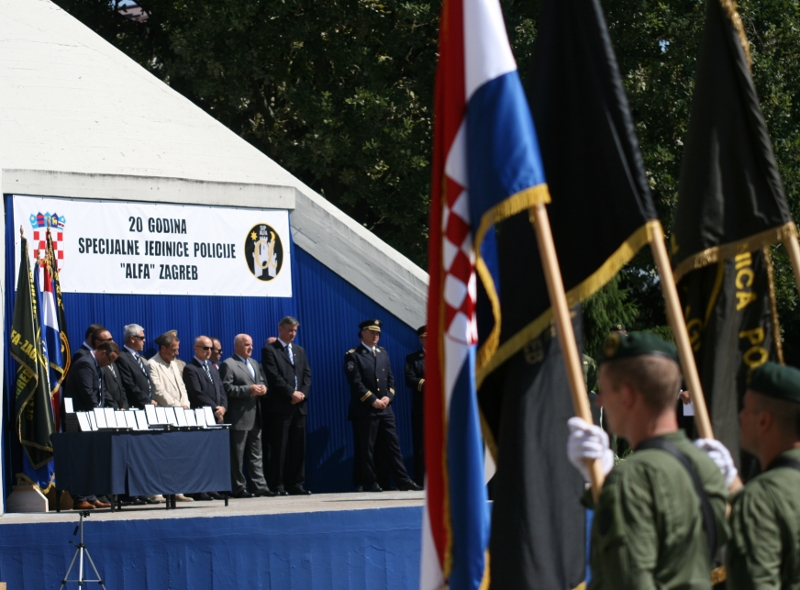
Special police Alfa Unit 20th anniversary celebration

In November 1991, the Ministry of the Interior redefined the organisation of the special police force, retaining a few units under direct control of the ministry and assigning others to county police administrations. The move was devised in response to the advance of the JNA. The scheme included the establishment of an SPU in each of the 20 county police administrations. At the time, there were up to 19 such SPUs. Under the scheme, the Karlovac, Gospić, Osijek, Slavonski Brod and Zagreb SPUs were planned to have 180 troops each. The Rijeka, Sisak, Bjelovar and Šibenik SPUs were scheduled to comprise 150 troops each, while the Split, Zadar, Kutina, Vinkovci, Županja and Vukovar SPUs were planned as 120-strong units. The smallest, 100-strong units were to be based in Pula, Varaždin, Zabok and Dubrovnik. Overall, the scheme called for 2,620 active special police troops in the regionally organised units alone, and defined that each of the units should have a matching number of reserve troops.

No additional SPUs were set up in 1992, regardless of discrepancies between the November 1991 reorganisation scheme and the actual order of battle of the special police. Two additional SPUs were set up and assigned to the Koprivnica-Križevci and Požega-Slavonia police administrations in 1993. Following a reorganisation of the force carried out in 2001, the regionally based units were amalgamated into four units—Zagreb, Split, Rijeka and Osijek. At the same time, the special police was reduced to 300 personnel.

Units subordinated to county police administrations
Unit	Established	Notes
Lovinac	17 August 1990	The Lovinac SPU, nicknamed Vila Velebita after a Croatian patriotic song, was attached to the Lovinac police station, after it had been established as a volunteer unit. Croatian forces lost control of Lovinac to the forces of SAO Krajina on 26 September 1991. The unit withdrew from Lovinac. It was subsequently based on the Velebit Mountain, and later it took part in Operations Maslenica and Storm.
Zadar	15 October 1990	The Zadar SPU, nicknamed Horned Vipers (Poskoci), was attached to the Zadar County police administration. The unit initially consisted of 30 troops, however by 15 March 1991 it had grown to 130, including 20 reserve troops. The Zadar SPU sustained its first fatality on 2 May 1991 in Polača near Zadar, in an event that led to riots in Zadar. The unit initially fought in the Zadar hinterland, including during the Battle of Zadar. The Zadar SPU contributed troops to maintaining defensive positions on the Velebit mountain in 1992–95, and took part in Operations Maslenica, Medak Pocket, Flash and Storm. During the war, the Zadar SPU sustained losses of five troops killed and ten wounded.
Bjelovar	23 February 1991	The Bjelovar SPU, nicknamed Omega, was attached to the Bjelovar-Bilogora County police administration. Deployments of the unit included the Pakrac clash on 1 March 1991. The unit took part in Operations Maslenica, Medak Pocket, Flash and Storm.
Karlovac	1 March 1991	The Karlovac SPU, nicknamed Thunder (Grom), was attached to the Karlovac County police administration. The unit initially comprised two companies of volunteers from Karlovac, and one platoon from Slunj, Ogulin and Duga Resa each. The unit took part in the Plitvice Lakes fighting in March 1991, in the Battle of the Barracks in Karlovac and Ogulin, the Battle of Konavle, and in Operations Maslenica, Medak Pocket, Flash and Storm.
Osijek	3 March 1991	The Osijek SPU, nicknamed Eagle (Orao), was attached to the Osijek-Baranja County police administration. Initially, the unit consisted of 160 troops, but by 1993, the unit had reached a strength of about 300. During the war, 19 members of the unit died and 66 were wounded. The unit was deployed throughout the country and took part in fighting in Borovo Selo, as well as in Operations Maslenica, Medak Pocket, Flash and Storm. The unit had a forward deployed platoon of special police in Našice. The platoon was designated the Našice–Orahovica SPU.
Vinkovci	3 March 1991	The Vinkovci SPU, nicknamed Ticks (Krpelji), was attached to the Vukovar-Srijem County police administration. The unit sustained losses of 20 troops killed in the Croatian War of Independence, including twelve in the Battle of Borovo Selo.
Slavonski Brod	8 March 1991	The Slavonski Brod SPU, nicknamed Šima's Hells Angels (Šimini anđeli pakla), was attached to the Brod-Posavina County police administration. A special police platoon was established in Nova Gradiška on 15 March 1991. It was nicknamed Zebras (Zebre) and attached to the Slavonski Brod SPU. The unit also contained a platoon of special police drawn from Požega. Besides the Nova Gradiška and Požega platoons, the unit comprised one reserve and two active platoons based in Slavonski Brod. Its personnel were trained at the Valbandon Training Centre. Slavonski Brod SPU sustained wartime losses of eight killed and 86 wounded. A monument to the unit's casualties was placed in front of the SPU's headquarters in Podvinje near Slavonski Brod in May 2013. The unit took part in fighting in Banovina and western Slavonia in 1991, as well as the Battle of Vukovar, mopping up after Operation Papuk-91 and Operations Flash and Storm.
Split	15 March 1991	The Split SPU, nicknamed BATT, was attached to the Split-Dalmatia County police administration. The nickname was derived from initial letters of surnames of the first four unit members killed in the war: Bočina, Abramović, Tomaš and Topić. A large number of unit members was transferred to the ZNG to enable founding of the 4th Guards Brigade.
Šibenik	15 March 1991	The Šibenik SPU, nicknamed Hawks (Jastrebovi), was attached to the Šibenik County police administration.
Sisak	15 March 1991	The Sisak SPU, nicknamed Wasp (Osa), was attached to the Sisak-Moslavina County police administration and based in the Viktorovac area of Sisak. The unit took part in fighting in Banovina, western Slavonia, and around Dubrovnik in 1991–92 and held defensive positions on the Velebit with other SPUs in 1992–95. It also took part in Operations Flash and Storm. During the war, the Sisak SPU lost five killed and one missing in action.
Kutina	15 March 1991	The Sisak SPU, nicknamed Lynx (Ris), was also attached to the Sisak-Moslavina County police administration, and its members were generally drawn from Ivanić Grad, Kutina, Novska and Garešnica. The unit took part in Operation Flash.
Zlatar	15 March 1991	The Zlatar SPU, nicknamed Baron (Barun), was attached to the Krapina-Zagorje County police administration.
Gospić	15 March 1991	The Gospić SPU, nicknamed Tiger (Tigar), was attached to the Lika-Senj County police administration. The unit took part in Operations Maslenica, Medak Pocket and Storm and maintained positions on the Velebit for most of the war. It sustained losses of six killed and 26 wounded during the war.
Varaždin	18 March 1991	The Varaždin SPU, nicknamed Stork (Roda), was attached to the Varaždin County police administration. The unit was deployed to eastern Slavonia in September 1991 as part of a 170-strong reinforcement sent by the Varaždin police. On 9 November, during the Battle of Vukovar, the unit unsuccessfully tried to break through from Vinkovci to Vukovar. The Varaždin SPU took part in fighting throughout Croatia, including Operations Maslenica, Flash and Storm, sustaining losses of 11 killed, 39 wounded and two captured troops.
Rijeka	8 April 1991	The Rijeka SPU, nicknamed Sharks (Ajkule), was attached to the Primorje-Gorski Kotar County police administration. The unit took part in the defence of Dubrovnik and Operations Maslenica, Flash and Storm, sustaining loss of seven members killed during the war.
Dubrovnik	5 May 1991	The Dubrovnik SPU, nicknamed Graf (Grof), was attached to the Dubrovnik-Neretva County police administration. The unit took part in the defence of Dubrovnik and Operations Maslenica, Medak Pocket and Storm.
Zagreb	23 July 1991	The Zagreb SPU, nicknamed Alpha (Alfa), was attached to the Zagreb police administration. Its first commanding officer was Vladimir Faber. The unit took part in fighting in the Banovina region, the Battle of the Barracks, and Operations Maslenica, Medak Pocket, Flash, Storm and elsewhere throughout Croatia. The Zagreb SPU also contributed to maintenance of the defence on the Velebit. The unit strength peaked at 220–250 troops.
Istra	27 July 1991	The Istra SPU, nicknamed Bull (Bak), was attached to the Istria County police administration and based in Valbandon. The unit took part in fighting in Banovina, Lika, Dalmatia and Slavonia, as well as in Operations Maslenica, Medak Pocket, Flash and Storm. Six unit members were killed during the war.
Županja	17 September 1991	The Županja SPU, nicknamed Delta, was attached to the Vukovar-Srijem County police administration.
Požega	15 March 1993	The Požega SPU, nicknamed Trenk after Baron Franz von der Trenck, was attached to the Požega-Slavonia County police administration. A 33-strong platoon of special police, established on 8 March 1991 and drawn from Požega police station, was previously a part of the Slavonski Brod SPU. The unit took part in Operation Flash.
Koprivnica	1 August 1993	The Koprivnica SPU, nicknamed Ban after Dražen Baniček, a member of the 4th Platoon of the Bjelovar SPU who was killed in action, was attached to the Koprivnica-Križevci County police administration. Prior to August 1993, special police troops drawn from the Koprivnica area were largely assigned to the Bjelovar SPU. In turn, the Koprivnica SPU was formed from troops transferred from the Bjelovar SPU and additional forces drawn from the HV. The unit contributed to the defence of the Velebit Mountain and supported several HV operations, including Flash and Storm. The first wartime commander of the unit was Miralem Alečković.
