= Ježdovec =

- Village
- Location within Croatia
- Coordinates: 45.77669°N 15.84601°E
- Country: Croatia
- County: City of Zagreb

Area
  - Total: 3.0 sq mi (7.7 km^{2})

Population (2021)
  - Total: 1,844
  - Density: 620/sq mi (240/km^{2})
- Time zone: UTC+1 (CET)
  - Summer (DST): UTC+2 (CEST)

Ježdovec is a village in Central Croatia, located west of Zagreb. It is part of the city of Zagreb, the capital of Croatia.

== Demographics ==
According to the 2021 census, its population was 1,844. According to the 2011 census, it had 1,728 inhabitants.

== Transport ==
Lučko Airport, named after the nearby suburb Lučko, is located on the southern outskirts of Ježdovec.
