= Pakrac clash =

Bloodless skirmish and first armed incident of the Croatian War of Independence

Coordinates: 45.438°N 17.19°E

- Part of the Croatian War of Independence
- Location of Pakrac in Croatia
Date	1–2 March 1991
Location	Pakrac, Croatia, SFR Yugoslavia
Result	Status quo ante bellum: Beginning of the Croatian War of Independence; Croatian special police retake the town of Pakrac from Serb rebels; Status quo ante bellum restored by agreement

Belligerents
Croatia	(Republic of Serbian Krajina) Rebel Serb insurgents Supported by: SFR Yugoslavia

Commanders and leaders
(Socialist Republic of Croatia) Marko Lukić (Socialist Republic of Croatia) Mladen Markač (Socialist Republic of Croatia) Stjepan Kupsjak	(Republic of Serbian Krajina) Jovo Vezmar Milan Čeleketić

Units involved
Lučko Anti-Terrorist Unit; Omega special police company	Krajina Militia (Socialist Federal Republic of Yugoslavia) Armoured battalion of the 265th Mechanised Brigade

Strength
200 special police troops	Unknown

Casualties and losses
None	180 rebels captured

The Pakrac clash, known in Croatia as the Battle of Pakrac (Croatian: Bitka za Pakrac), was a bloodless skirmish that took place in the Croatian town of Pakrac in March 1991. The clash was a result of increasing ethnic tensions in Croatia during the breakup of Yugoslavia. It was one of the first serious outbreaks of violence in what became the Croatian War of Independence.

The clash began after rebel Serbs seized the town's police station and municipal building and harassed Croatian government officials. The Croatian government carried out a counterstrike against the rebels, sending Interior Ministry special police to re-establish control. Fighting broke out between the two sides. Despite an attempted intervention by the Yugoslav People's Army (Jugoslovenska Narodna Armija – JNA), the Croatian government reasserted its control over the town. After a standoff with the JNA, an agreement to pull out the special police and the JNA was reached, restoring the town to conditions before the Serb attempt to seize control of the police there.

== Background ==
In 1990, following the electoral defeat of the government of the Socialist Republic of Croatia by the Croatian Democratic Union (Croatian: Hrvatska demokratska zajednica, HDZ), ethnic tensions between Croats and Serbs worsened. The Yugoslav People's Army (Jugoslovenska Narodna Armija – JNA) confiscated Croatia's Territorial Defence (Teritorijalna obrana - TO) weapons to minimize resistance. On 17 August, the tensions escalated into an open revolt of the Croatian Serbs, centred on the predominantly Serb-populated areas of the Dalmatian hinterland around Knin, parts of the Lika, Kordun, Banovina, and eastern Croatia. The Croatian Serbs established the Serbian National Council in July 1990 to coordinate opposition to Croatian President Franjo Tuđman's policy of pursuing independence. Milan Babić, a dentist from the southern town of Knin, was elected president and Knin's police chief Milan Martić established paramilitary militias. The two men eventually became the political and military leaders of the Republic of Serb Krajina (RSK), a self-declared state incorporating the Serb-inhabited areas of Croatia.

In the beginning of 1991, Croatia had no regular army. To bolster its defence, Croatia doubled police personnel to about 20,000. The most effective part of the force was 3,000-strong special police deployed in twelve battalions adopting military organisation. There were also 9,000–10,000 regionally organised reserve police, which was organized in 16 battalions and 10 companies but lacked weapons. According to the Croatian 1991 census, Serbs were the largest ethnic group in the municipality of Pakrac (46.4%), followed by Croats (35.8%). Serb Democratic Party politician Veljko Džakula became the political leader of Croatian Serbs in western Slavonia. He held a view that Serbs should secede from Croatia.

On 22 February, the municipal council controlled by Džakula voted to join the Serbian Autonomous Oblast of Krajina (later renamed the RSK) and subordinate the Pakrac police station to the Ministry of Internal Affairs of Krajina. The vote was annulled by the Constitutional Court of Croatia on 28 February.

== Timeline ==
Croatian special police at the Pakrac police station, 2 March 1991

In February 1991, Babić and Martić directed Serb paramilitaries to take over the town's police station and municipal buildings. On 1 March, the paramilitaries disarmed the town's 16 Croatian policemen and subjected local Croatian officials to a campaign of vilification and intimidation. The police in Pakrac were commanded by Jovo Vezmar, who sided with Babić and Martić.

In response, President Franjo Tuđman ordered the Croatian Interior Ministry to restore the government's authority over the town. At 04:30 on 2 March 1991, the first part of a 200-strong Croatian police force entered Pakrac. A company of the "Omega" special police unit, dispatched from Bjelovar, approached via the village of Badljevina, where a number of Croatian civilians followed the force towards Pakrac. A barricade outside Pakrac was cleared with no resistance, and the Croatian police secured the town's police station unopposed. Several hours later, shots were fired at the police station from a nearby hill by a force commanded by Vezmar. Soon afterwards, a second Croatian special police unit, the Lučko Anti-Terrorist Unit, arrived from Zagreb. Vezmar retreated east towards the villages of Šeovica and Bučje on the Psunj Mountain. The special police, commanded by Marko Lukić and Mladen Markač, arrested 180 ethnic-Serb rebels, including 32 ethnic-Serb policemen, without either side sustaining deaths or injuries. Vezmar was replaced by Stjepan Kupsjak as the Pakrac police chief.

The Croatian action prompted an intervention from the federal Yugoslav government. Borisav Jović, the Serbian representative on the collective Presidency of Yugoslavia, supported a request by Yugoslav Defence Minister Veljko Kadijević to send the JNA to the scene. The first ten JNA tanks arrived in Pakrac late in the evening of 1 March and took positions in various parts of the town; most of them were stationed near the town hospital. The next afternoon, an additional JNA unit led by Colonel Milan Čeleketić arrived in Pakrac, taking positions close to the Croatian special police. Čeleketić was acting on the orders of Major General Jevrem Cokić, commander of the 32nd (Varaždin) Corps. Cokić authorised deployment of three companies of the armoured battalion of the 265th Mechanised Brigade based in Bjelovar.

The arrival of JNA tanks in Pakrac came too late to stop the Croatian special police from retaking the town. However, it prompted the remaining Serb rebels to begin shooting at the town from the surrounding hills. Shots were fired at a police vehicle on patrol. The policemen shot back at men retreating towards a JNA position, and the JNA shot at the police vehicle in return. The shooting ended when talks between Croatian member of the federal presidency Stjepan Mesić and JNA Colonel Aleksandar Vasiljević produced an agreement that the Croatian police would be allowed to retain control of the town. The JNA planned to retake control of Pakrac from the special police by force. The attack, codenamed Pakrac-91, was cancelled when the Croatian authorities agreed to withdraw the special police by the evening of 3 March. The JNA withdrew from Pakrac following a decision of the Yugoslav Presidency, abandoning the northern approaches to the town on 12 March, and pulling out completely seven days later.

== Aftermath ==
The agreement to withdraw the special police and the JNA largely restored status quo ante bellum. 17 of the 32 arrested policemen returned to service by 5 March; charges were eventually filed against five, including Vezmar. The incident had a lasting significance because it was the first serious skirmish in what would become the Croatian War of Independence—a full-scale war between Croatia and its rebel Serb population supported by Serbia and the JNA. The Serbian government used the Pakrac clash to strengthen nationalist propaganda claims that Croatia was committing genocide against its Serb population. Up to 40 deaths from the clash were reported by Serbian and Montenegrin media outlets. In an indication of the confused and highly inaccurate nature of the reporting, the Belgrade daily newspaper Večernje novosti reported on its front page that the town's Orthodox priest had been killed, on its second page that he had been wounded, and on its third page it printed a statement from him. The Yugoslav presidency finally issued a statement that nobody had been killed in Pakrac.

In Serbia, the ruling Socialist Party of Serbia (SPS), led by Slobodan Milošević, condemned the Croatian police action as a "brutal attack by the Croatian government on the population of Pakrac [using] violent and fascist methods"—a statement that was carried prominently by the state-controlled Radio Television Belgrade. The SPS urged Serbs to attend "protest meetings against the violent behaviour of the Croatian HDZ government". Milošević used the Pakrac clash to demand that the JNA be authorised to forcibly disarm Croatia. The request, specifically demanding the granting of wartime powers to the JNA and the introduction of a state of emergency, was made through Kadijević at a Presidency session of 11–15 May. The request was refused, and Milošević declared that he no longer recognised the authority of the federal presidency.

The police intervention prompted Serb political leaders in Okučani to urge the local population to erect barricades around the town in to pre-empt another intervention—stating that police forces were moving in from Kutina and Novska. The barricades were guarded by armed civilians. In Pakrac, approximately 500 Serb protesters gathered in front of the municipal council building to demand the removal of the flag of Croatia.
