= Lučko Airfield =

Airport in Croatia

Lučko Airfield Zračno pristanište Lučko
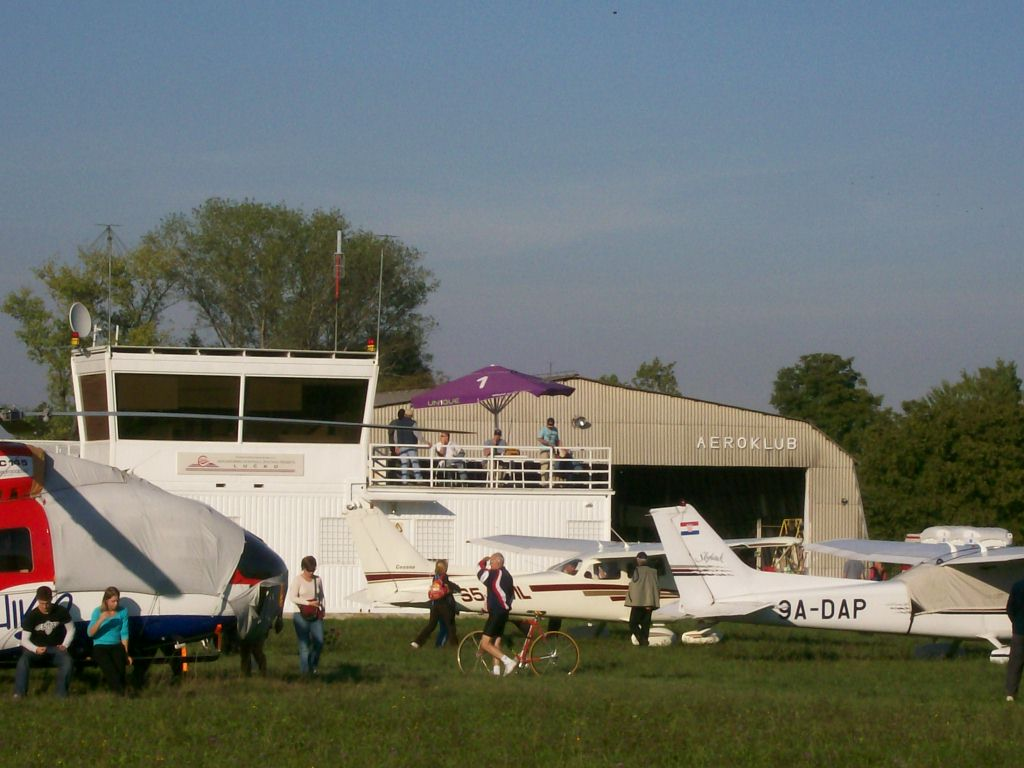
- Lučko Airfield
- IATA: none; ICAO: LDZL

Summary
- Airport type: Military/Public
- Owner/Operator: Aeroklub Zagreb
- Serves: Lučko
- Location: Ježdovec, Croatia
- Opened: 1 April 1947
- Passenger services ceased: 1972
- Built: 1943
- Occupants: Croatian Air Force; Lučko ATU
- Time zone: CET (UTC+1)
  - Summer (DST): CEST (UTC+2)
- Elevation AMSL: 123 m / 405 ft
- Coordinates: 45°46′0.41″N 15°50′55.31″E
- Website: aeroklub-zagreb.hr/aerodrom-lucko

Maps
- Interactive map of Lučko Airfield

Runways
| Direction | Length | | Surface |
| Direction | m | ft | Surface |
|---|---|---|---|
| 10R/28L | 850 | 2,789 | grass |
| 10L/28R | 850 | 2,789 | grass |

Lučko Airfield (ICAO: LDZL, Croatian: Zračno pristanište Lučko) is an airfield for general aviation and unscheduled air transport, located in Ježdovec near Lučko, in central Croatia, 11 kilometres (6.8 mi) southwest of Zagreb. It is operated by Aeroklub Zagreb and has two parallel grass runways measuring 850 by 30 metres (2,789 ft × 98 ft). Due to the lack of surfacing on the runways, it is only used from spring to autumn in dry periods. Aside from traffic, the airport is today a venue for air shows, such as Zagreb Air Show and Adria Air Race and an operation base for civilian pilot training.

Lučko was formerly Zagreb's main international airport, and later supported military aviation. It was constructed in 1943 and saw commercial operations from 1947 to 1959, after which commercial traffic was moved to the new Zagreb Airport with paved runways in Pleso. Lučko thereafter remained an airport for military and general aviation. Today it is also used by Croatian special police's Lučko Anti-Terrorist Unit.

The airport is equipped to serve light aircraft, helicopters, gliders, ultralight aviation, UAVs and parachuting. It is connected to Zagreb and Lučko by a regular bus line.

== History ==
The area was first used for air traffic in World War II by Luftwaffe in 1943. The next year the airfield was upgraded with a roughly 1,500 m (4,900 ft) grass runway, a small hangar, twelve mid-sized sheds for airplanes as well as workshops, and towards the end of the war saw use by the Independent State of Croatia Air Force. After the end of World War II, the airport began serving domestic commercial flights on 1 April 1947, soon adding international flights to the roster and taking the place of Borongaj Airport, which was heavily bombed during the war, as Zagreb's international airport. Its first year of commercial operation saw 1,430 flights, 11,000 passengers and thirty tonnes of cargo. In 1959, its final year of commercial operations, the airport served 167,000 passengers and 1,500 tonnes (1,700 short tons) of cargo. After the opening of the new Zagreb Airport in Pleso in 1962, Lučko Airport's importance waned, as its grass runways were never paved to accommodate newer, heavier Convair jets, which were displacing Douglas DC-3 airliners' market share by the late 1950s. The commercial traffic was moved to Pleso and Lučko was allocated completely to the Yugoslav People's Army and Aeroklub Zagreb, the latter of which was the first to open a civilian pilot school at Lučko. In 1978, the 14th World Parachuting Championships was held at Lučko.

In the 1990s, during the Croatian War of Independence, the airport was bombed by the Yugoslav People's Army, but the raid had been expected and all the airplanes and equipment had been evacuated beforehand. Two of the civilian airplanes were donated by their owners to the nascent Croatian air forces. After its formation, the Croatian Air Force began to use Lučko as an Air Base. The 94th Air Force Base was stationed there until it was disbanded in 2000, though the airport continues to be used by the Air Force. As of 2007, an Air Force helicopter squadron was stationed at Lučko. The Lučko Anti-Terrorist Unit of Croatian special police is also based at Lučko Airport and stations its helicopters there.

One notable accident happened during the era of the airport's commercial operation, on 21 September 1950, when a Douglas DC-3 on a domestic Jugoslavenski Aerotransport (JAT) flight crashed, killing 10 of the 11 people on board.

== Facilities ==
The aerodrome is located on Ježdovečka Road 17 on the outskirts of the village of Ježdovec. It is 3 km (2 mi) west of the eponymous Lučko and 11 km (7 mi) southwest of Zagreb's inner city borders. Airplanes up to 5,700 kg (12,600 lb) in maximum takeoff weight, gliders, ultralight aviation, and UAVs (drones) are allowed at Lučko Airport, in addition to parachuting, and police and military helicopters. The field is only used during dry periods from spring to autumn as the runways are not paved. Shuttle bus service is not provided but Ježdovec is served by the ZET bus line 168.

Its reference point (ARP) is located at 45°46′0.41″N 15°50′55.31″E at an elevation of 123 metres (405 ft) and a magnetic variation of 4.2 °E as of August 2019. There are two parallel runways in west-southwest and east-southeast orientation. The southern runway (10R/28L) is used mainly for powered aircraft, while the northern (10L/28R) is exclusively for unpowered aircraft. The airport also has two anemometres, three aprons, and a control tower responsible for monitoring air traffic over the surrounding area and most of Zagreb west of Dubrava.

| Runway name | Length | Width | Surface |
|---|---|---|---|
| 10R/28L | 850 metres (2,789 ft) | 30 metres (98 ft) | Grassy |
| 10L/28R | 850 metres (2,789 ft) | 30 metres (98 ft) | Grassy |

== Air shows and competitions ==
Lučko has been a venue for a number of air shows and competitions, such as the yearly Zagreb Air Show (Croatian: Zagrebački aeromiting), and Zagreb Cup (a parachuting precision landing competition; Kup grada Zagreba), as well as the 2nd Adria Air Race in 2012. Aeroklub Zagreb has also several times held Meetings for Rudi (Susreti za Rudija), an air show in remembrance of Croatian Air Force pilot Rudolf Perešin. Fédération Aéronautique Internationale's 14th World Precision Flying Championship took place at Lučko on 7–14 July 2002, attracting 54 participants from seventeen countries.

The 2nd Military World Games took place in Zagreb in 1999, and the parachuting competition was held at the Lučko Airport.

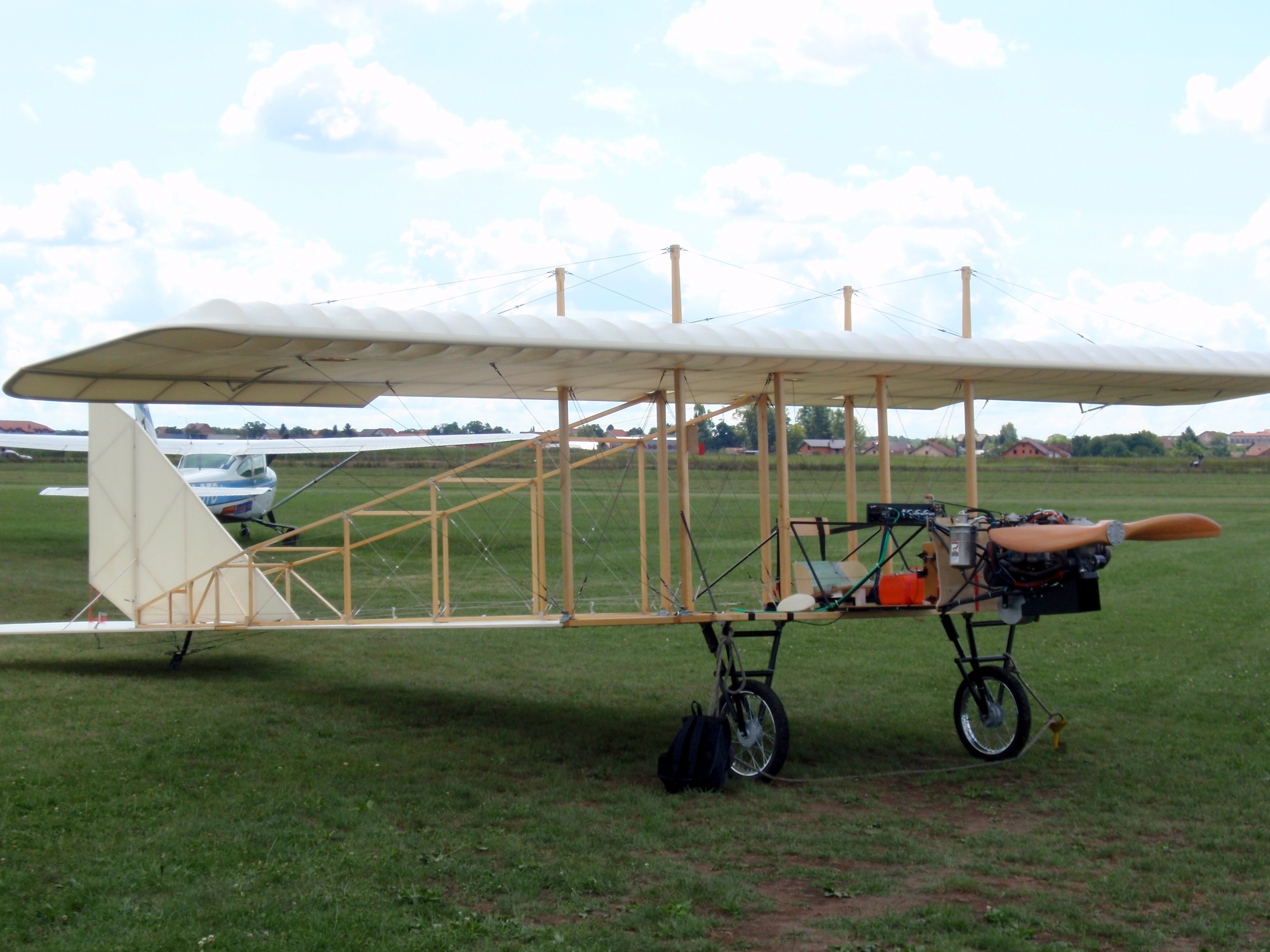
Replica of Slavoljub Penkala's 1910 model, the first aircraft in Croatia

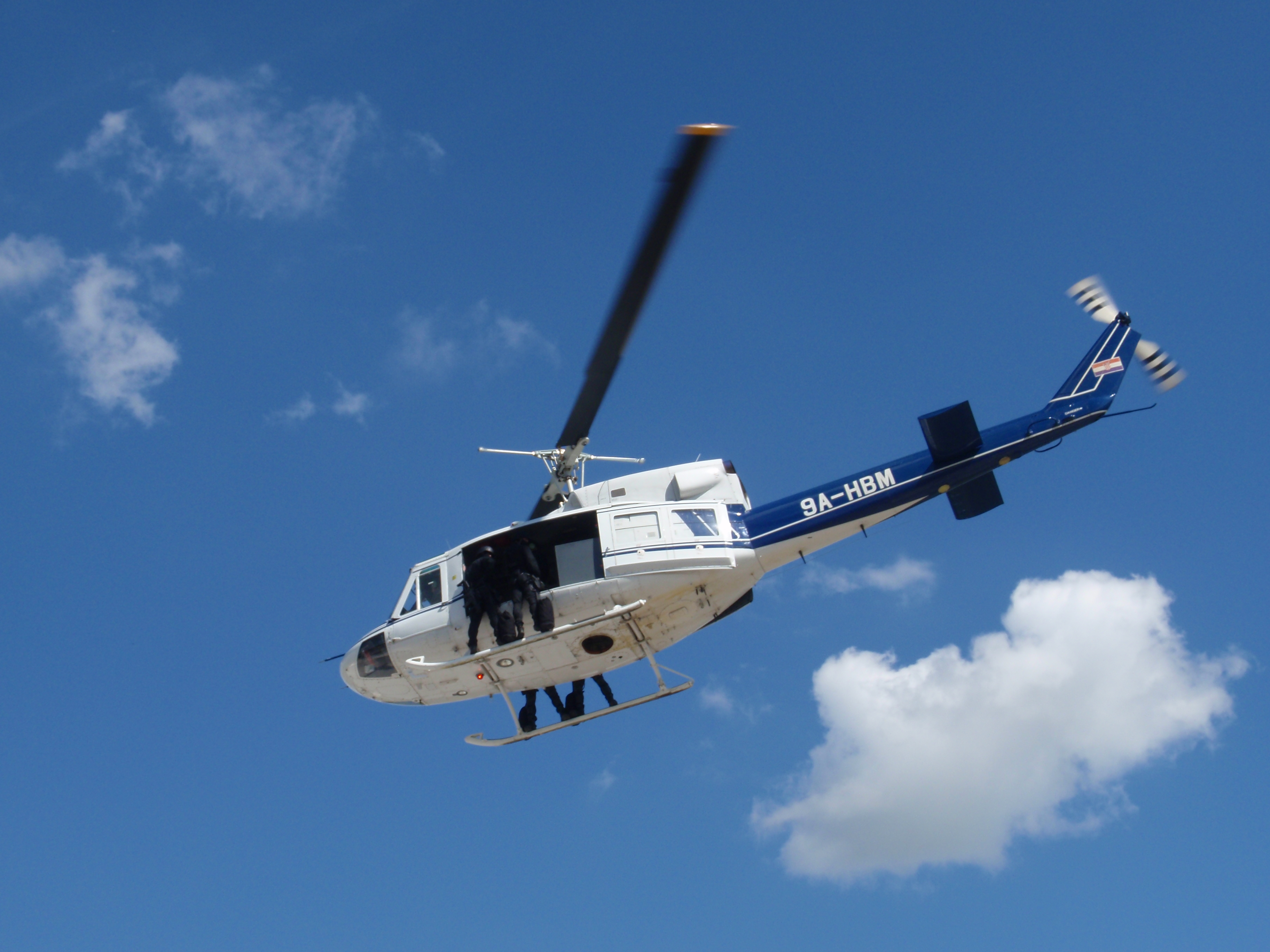
Croatian police helicopter at the 2010 Lučko Air Show

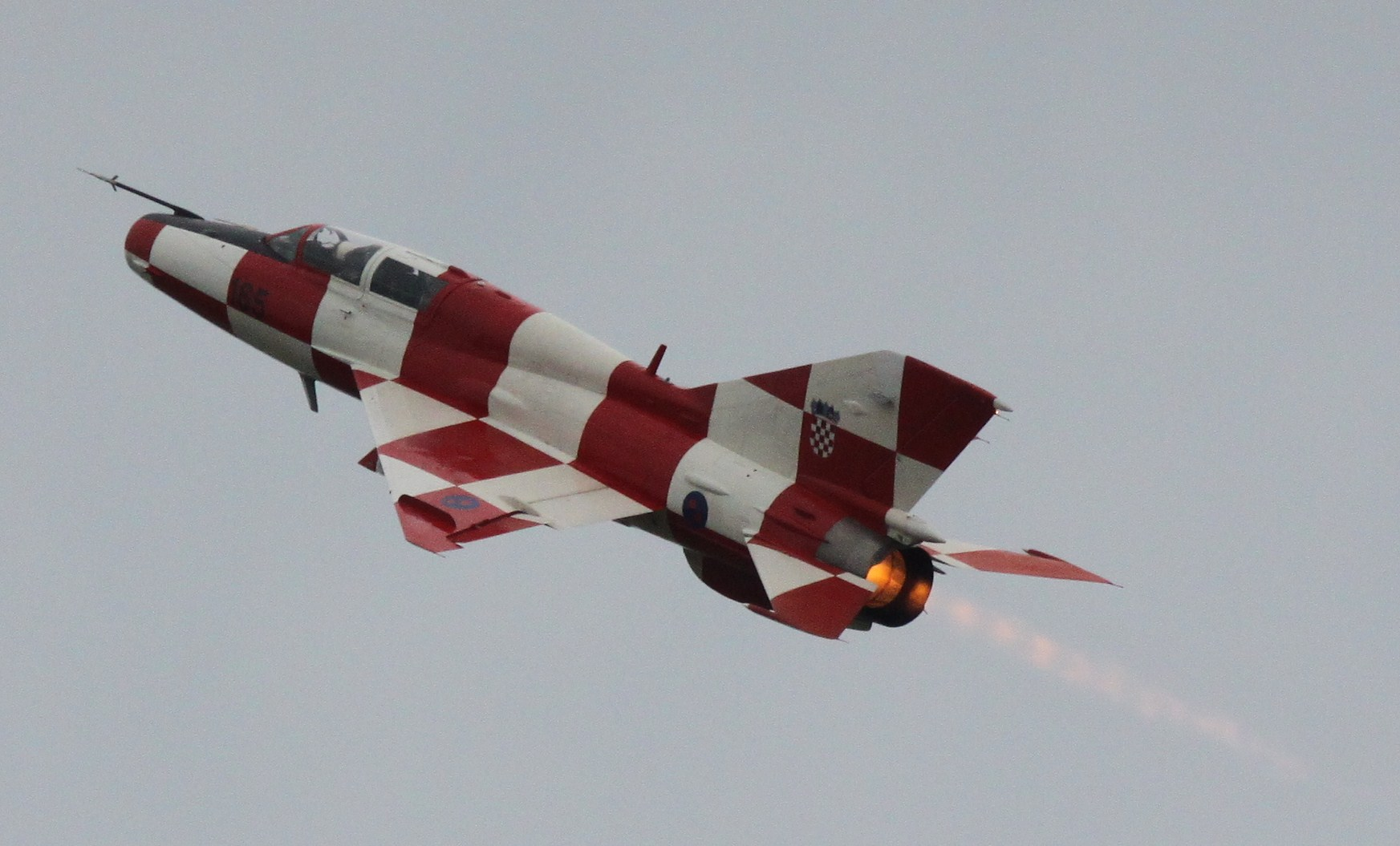
Air Force jet in Croatian checkerboard colours at the 2010 air show

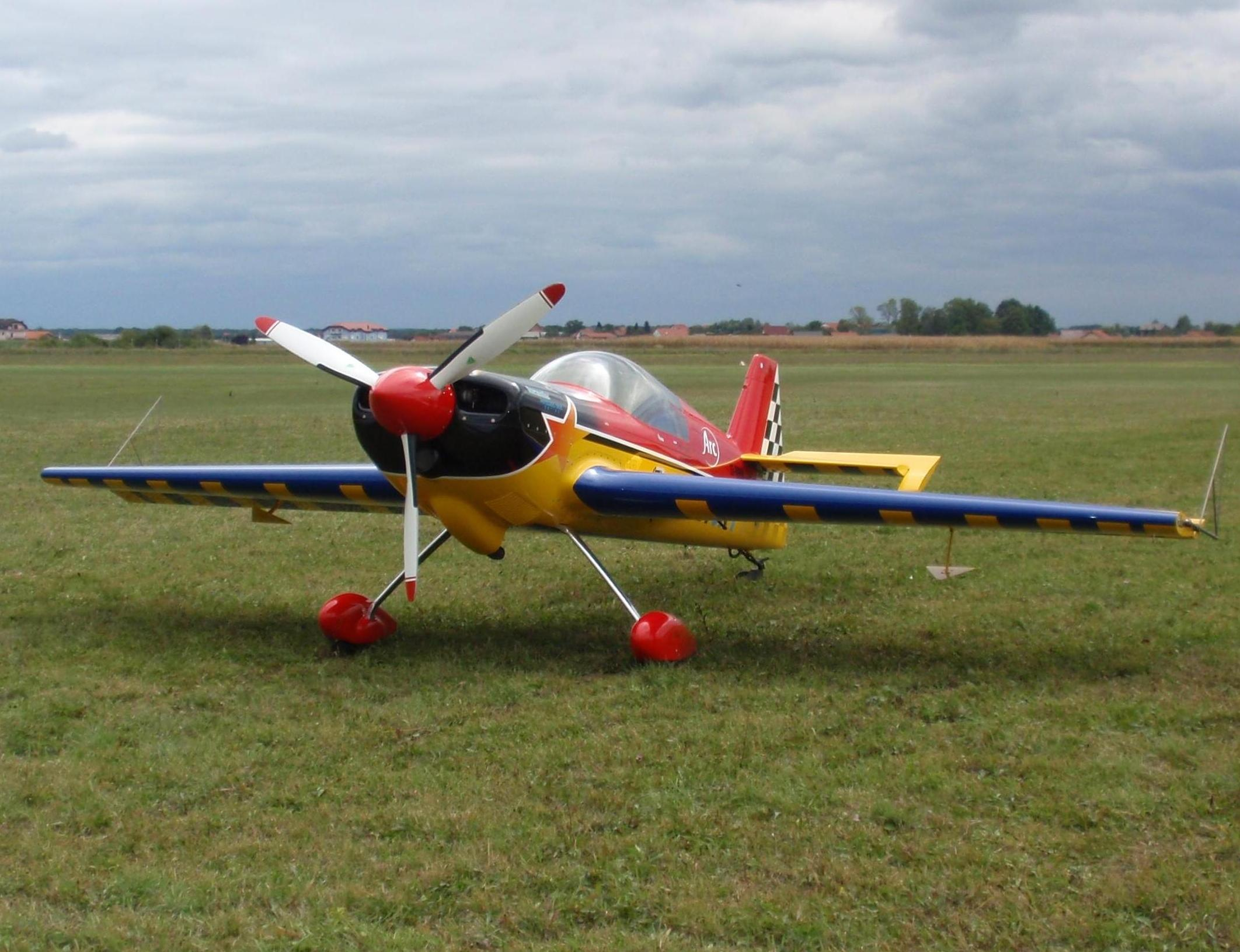
Giles G-202 aerobatic airplane parked at Lučko Airport

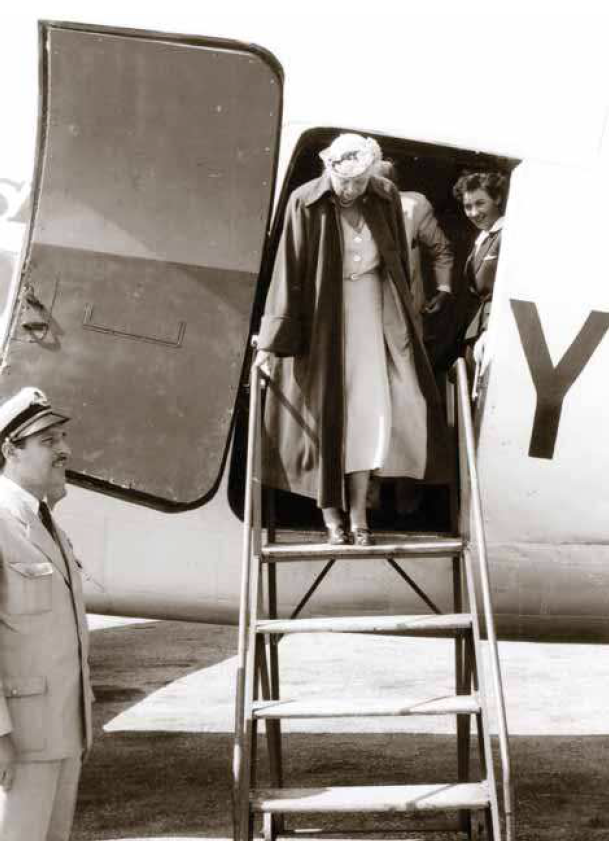
Eleanor Roosevelt disembarking a plane at the Lučko Airport in 1953

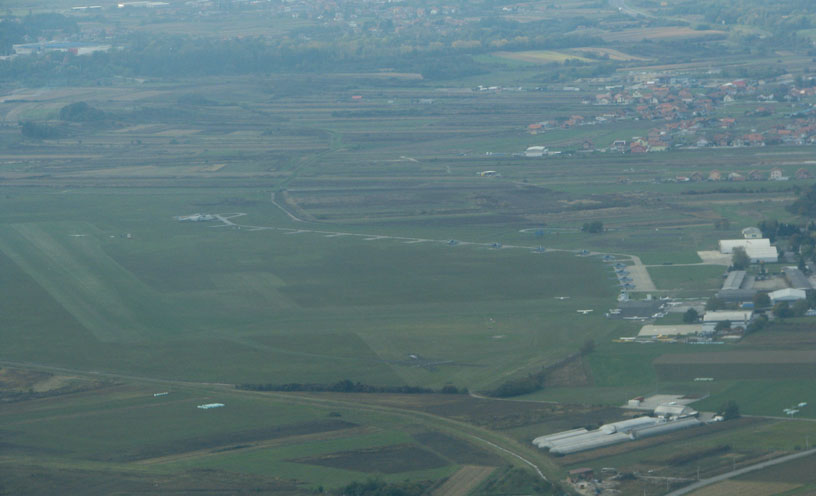
Aerial view of airfield
