= Church of St. John of Nepomuk, Lučko =

Church of St. John of Nepomuk
- Crkva sv. Ivana Nepomuka
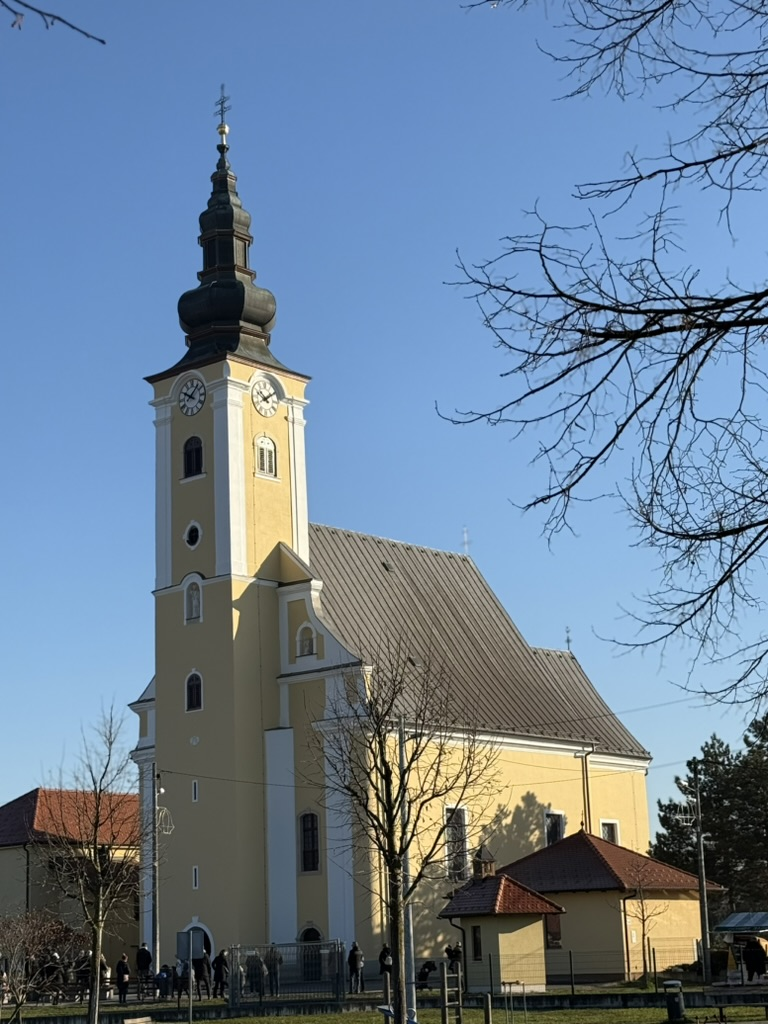
- Church in 2025
- Church of St. John of Nepomuk
- 45°45′37″N 15°52′56″E
- Location: Lučko
- Country: Croatia
- Denomination: Roman Catholic

Architecture
- Functional status: Active
- Architectural type: baroque
- Completed: 1772

Church of St. John of Nepomuk (Croatian: Crkva sv. Ivana Nepomuka) is a Catholic parish church located in Lučko, a suburban settlement of Zagreb, Croatia. The church was built in 1772.

It was built on the site of an old church dedicated to St. George the Martyr and first mentioned in 1331.

== History ==
In 1756, ban Karlo Batthyány sent a relic of the tongue of St. John of Nepomuk to Stupnik, which prompted the construction of a new church. The construction of the church began in 1769, and was completed and blessed on August 30, 1772. The church was built under the patronage of the noble Pejačevići and the counts Erdődy.

During the blessing of the church, the relics of St. John of Nepomuk, which were brought from Vienna, were displayed. The relics are still displayed in the church today on the feast day of May 16.

Although the church suffered damage in the 2020 Zagreb earthquake, strong pillars prevented the building from collapsing. The church was renovated several times during the 19th, 20th, and 21st centuries.

== Architecture ==
The parish church has a tall bell tower connected to a Baroque shaped facade with three entrances. In the central part of the bell tower, in a niche, there is a stone statue of St. John of Nepomuk, and under the copper roof there is a clock and several windows. In the church itself, in the elevated sanctuary, there is a Baroque gilded altar with decorative columns, a palanquin of St. John of Nepomuk, a tabernacle and statues of saints in the Baroque style. Massive half-columns support the high roofs of the church.

== Gallery ==
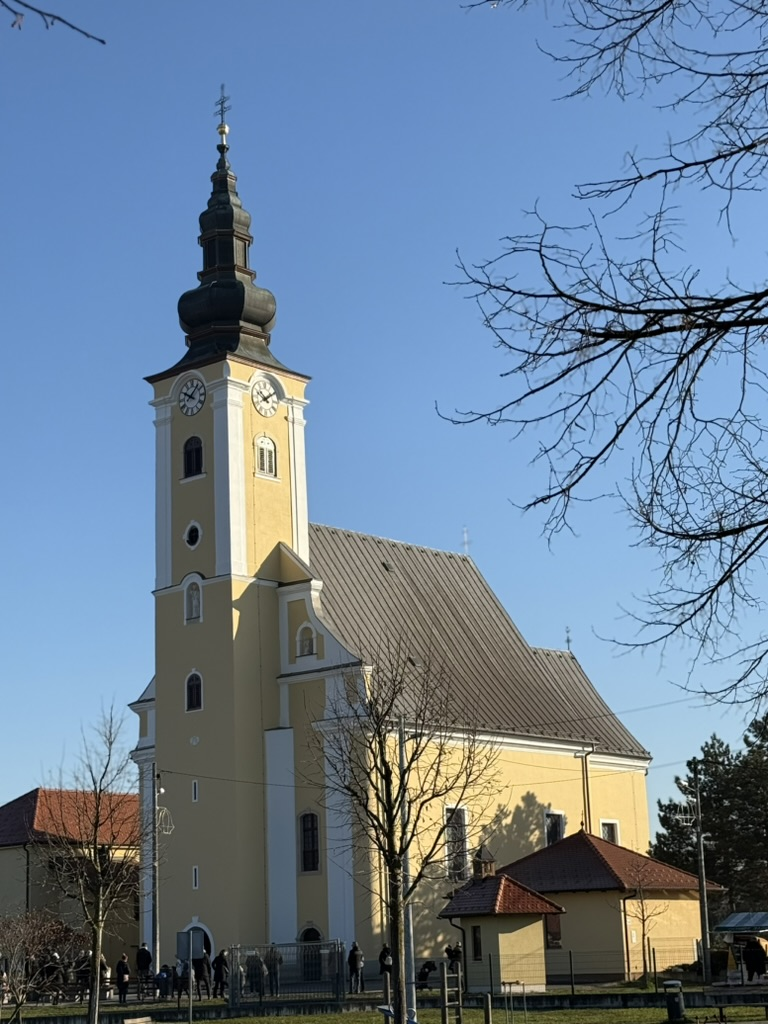
View of the church

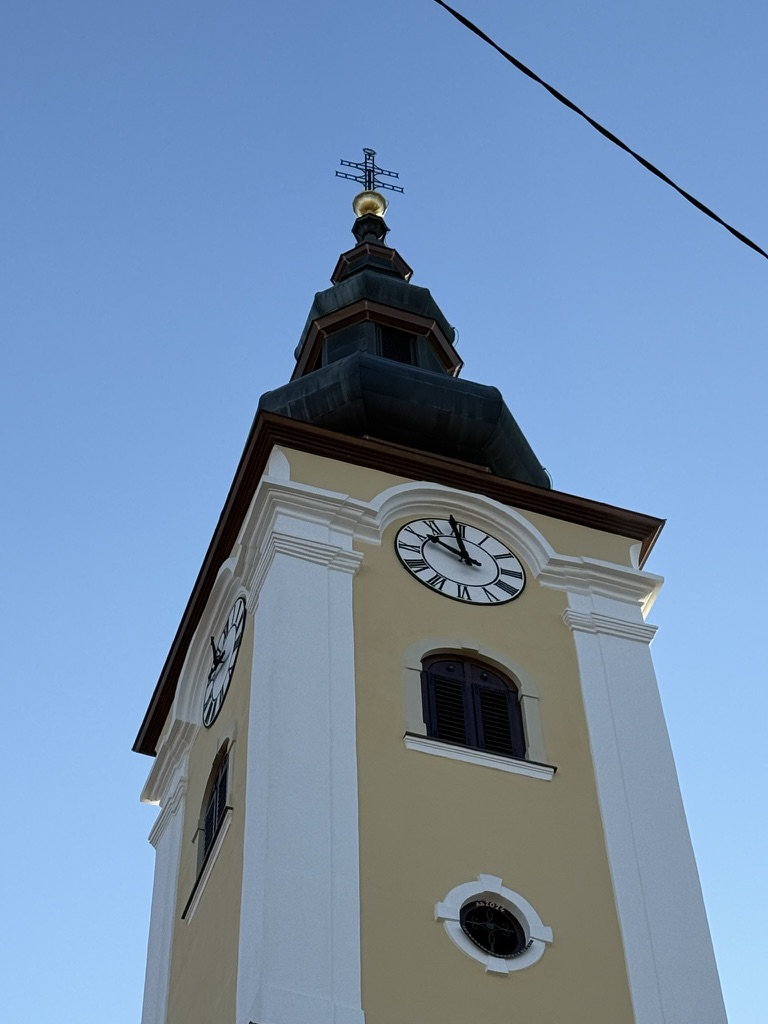
Belfry

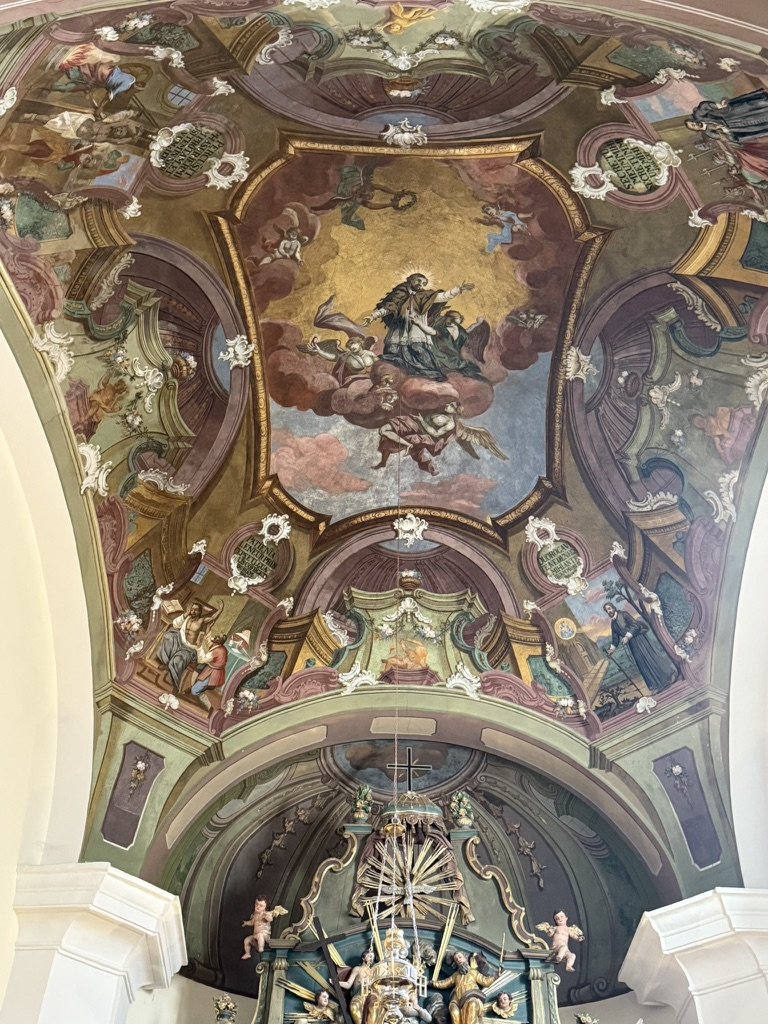
Vault

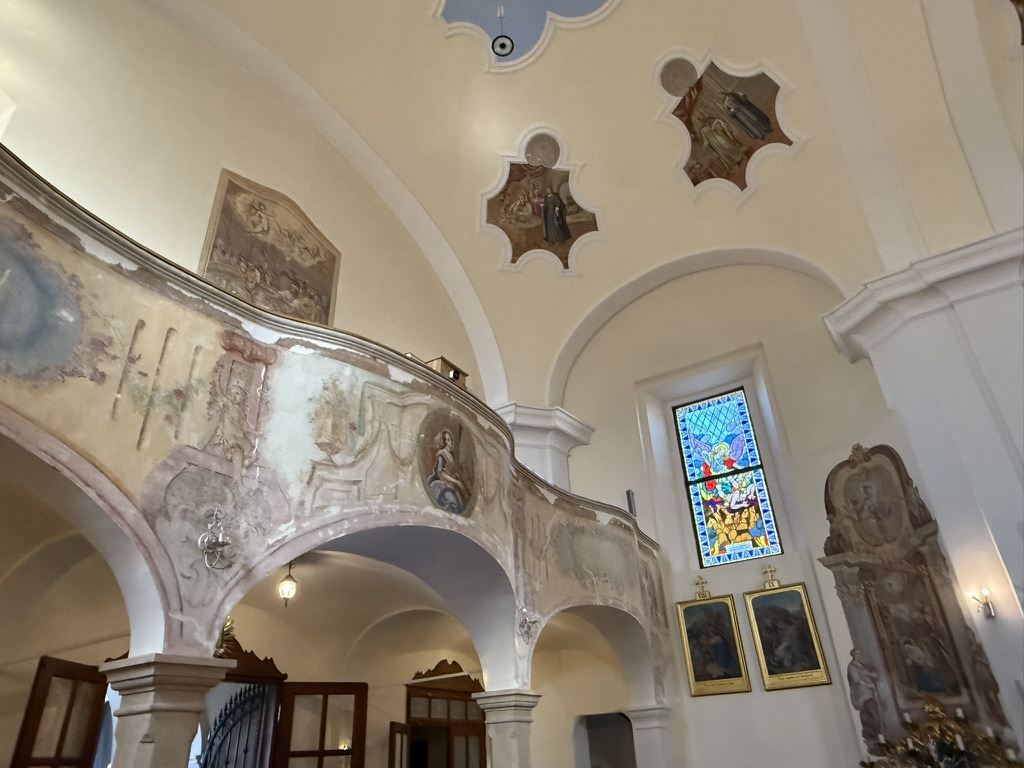
Interior of the church

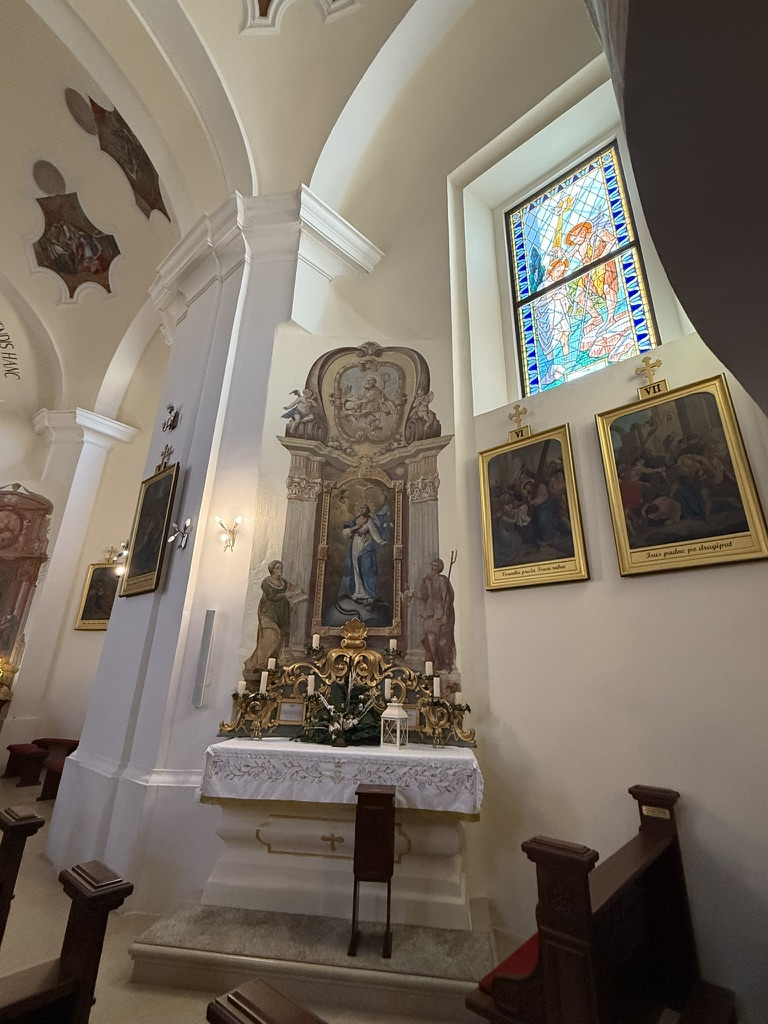
Interior of the church

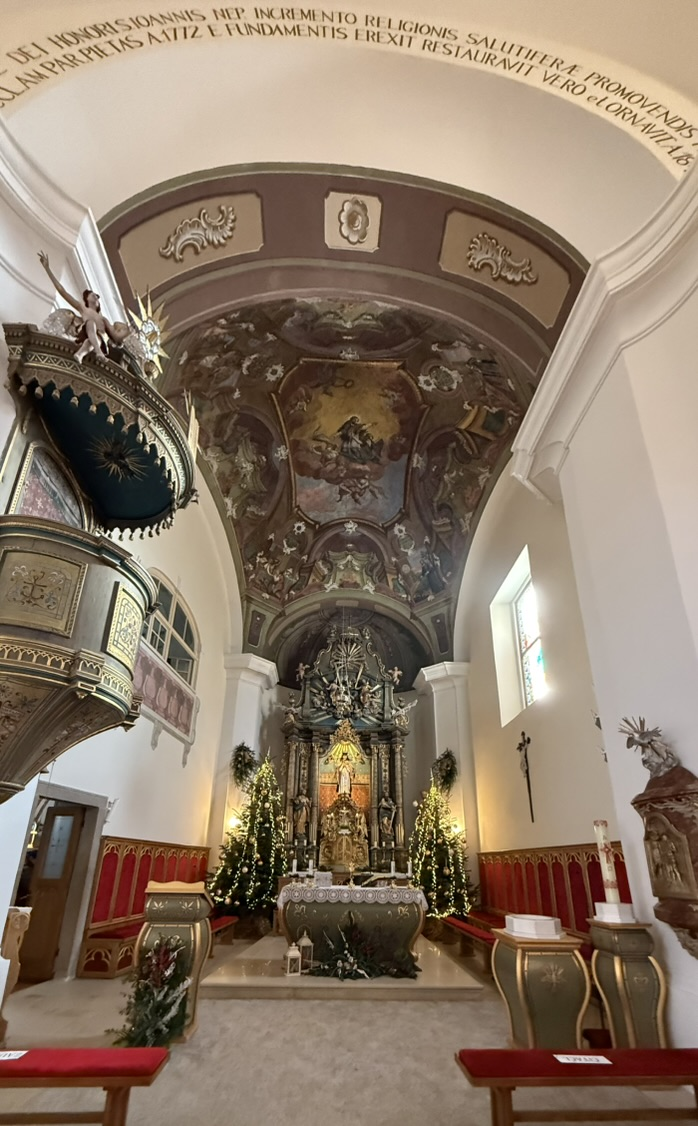
View of the altar

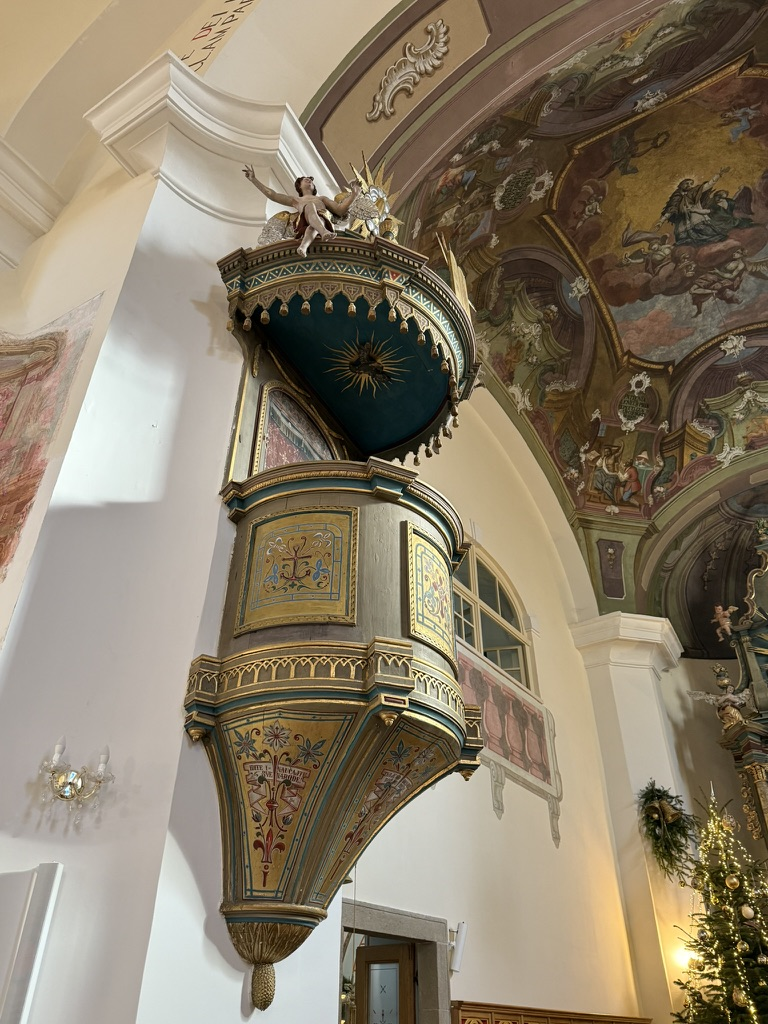
Pulpit

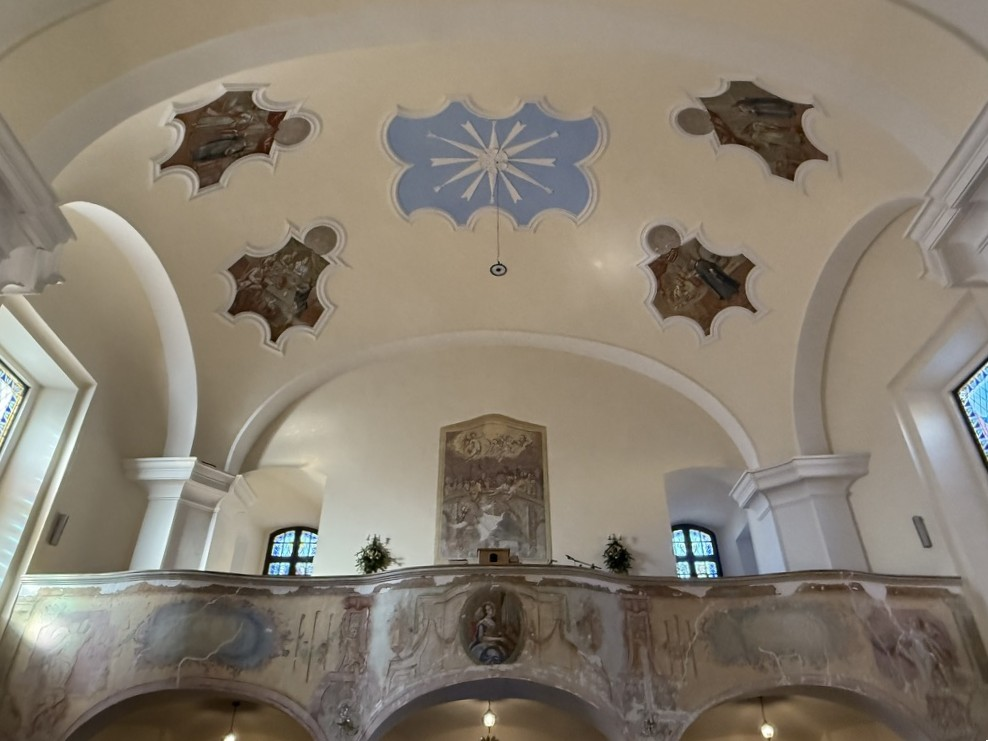
Chorus

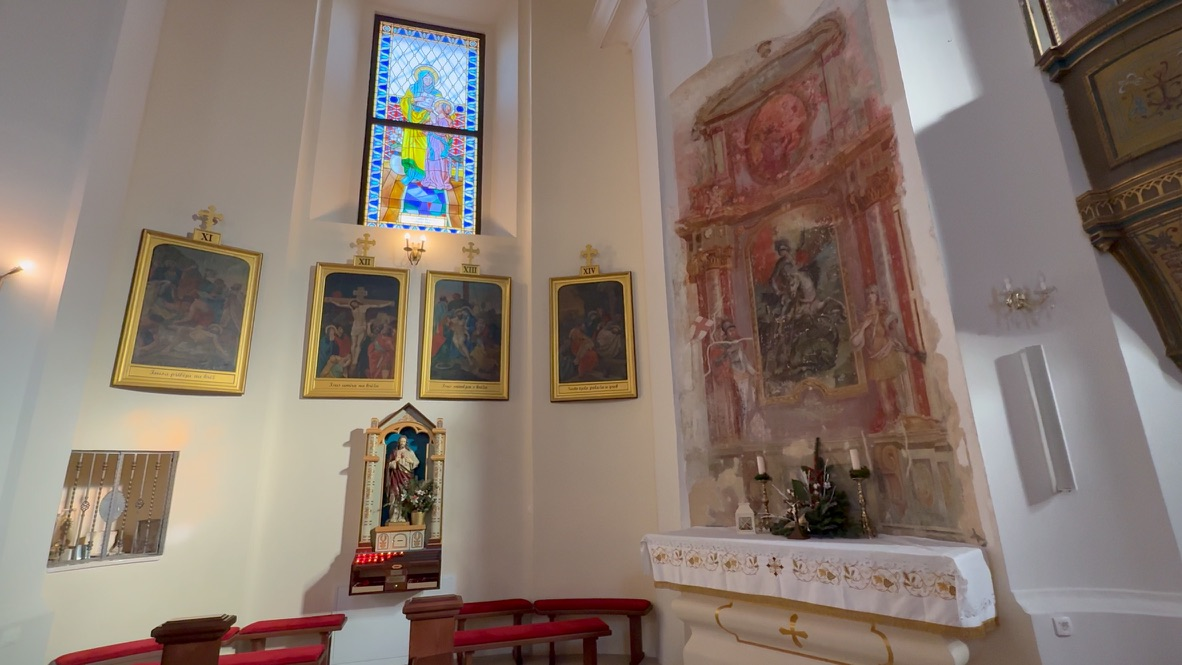
Stained glass and decorations
