= Lučko Anti-Terrorist Unit =

Anti-terrorist special police unit in Croatia

- Antiteroristička jedinica Lučko (Croatian)
- Emblem
- Active: 7 September 1990 – present
- Country: Croatia
- Agency: Croatian Police
- Type: Police tactical unit
- Role: Counter-terrorism; Law enforcement
- Headquarters: Lučko
- Abbreviation: Lučko ATU

Structure
- Officers: 130

Anti-Terrorist Unit Lučko (ATU Lučko) (Croatian: Antiteroristička jedinica Lučko; ATJ Lučko), also known as the Lučko Anti-Terrorist Unit (Croatian: Lučko Antiteroristička jedinica; Lučko ATJ) is the police tactical unit of the Croatian Police stationed in Lučko near Zagreb, the capital of Croatia. Initially distinguishing itself in the Croatian War of Independence, it has gone on to become Croatia's leading police tactical unit. Like all police units in the country, it is under the command of the Ministry of the Interior. It is a member of the ATLAS Network, an association of European police tactical units.

Several of its operators have gone on to achieve notability, including Croatian mixed martial arts fighter Mirko "Cro Cop" Filipović.

== History ==
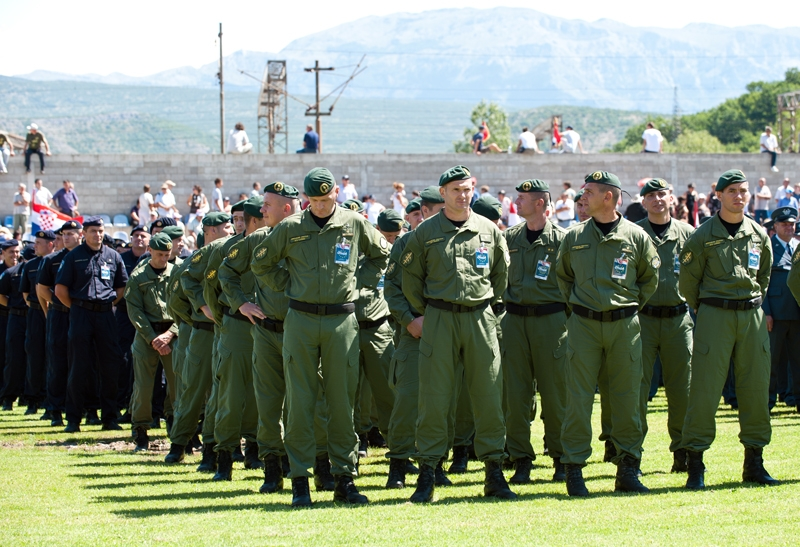
Members of Lučko ATU during the 16th anniversary of Operation Storm

The unit was established on 7 September 1990. It initially comprised 225 volunteers, many of whom had been enrolled in the First Croatian Police Officer course (Croatian: Prvi hrvatski redarstvenik), which was formed in order to create a police force loyal to the new Croatian government during the political tensions leading to Croatia's proclamation of independence from Yugoslavia, and the subsequent escalation of the Croatian War of Independence. It was the first Croatian fighting unit taking part in the war. It was also the only fighting unit of Croatian Special Police Forces at that time, and the first unit of the future Croatian Special Police.

Its first missions were to restore public order in areas where Serbs participating in the Log Revolution were trying to wrest control from the authorities; to take control of the barracks and confiscate weapons of the Yugoslav People's Army, whose authority in Croatia was rescinded by the country's government after it sided with the Log Revolution; and to train units which would later be organised into the Croatian Armed Forces. The unit saw its first military skirmish on 1 March 1991, the Pakrac clash. It took part in many battles during the war, including the Plitvice Lakes incident, battles of Glina, Topusko, Petrinja, Nuštar, the Siege of Dubrovnik, and Operations Maslenica, Medak Pocket, Flash and Storm. In October 1991, the unit spearheaded an unsuccessful attempt to lift the siege of Vukovar, during this attempt the unit suffered 12 fatalities.

Members of Lučko ATU's chain of command, including General Mladen Markač, were tried by the International Criminal Tribunal for the former Yugoslavia (ICTY) for alleged war crimes committed during Operation Storm. They were acquitted of all charges on appeal.

After the Croatian War of Independence, the unit specialised in special police assignments. During the course of the war, 14, 19, 24, 41 Lučko ATU police officers were killed and 52 wounded in the unit of 350 members. Subsequently, none of the members have been killed on duty, although several have perished at training in diving accidents.

== Organisation and specialisations ==
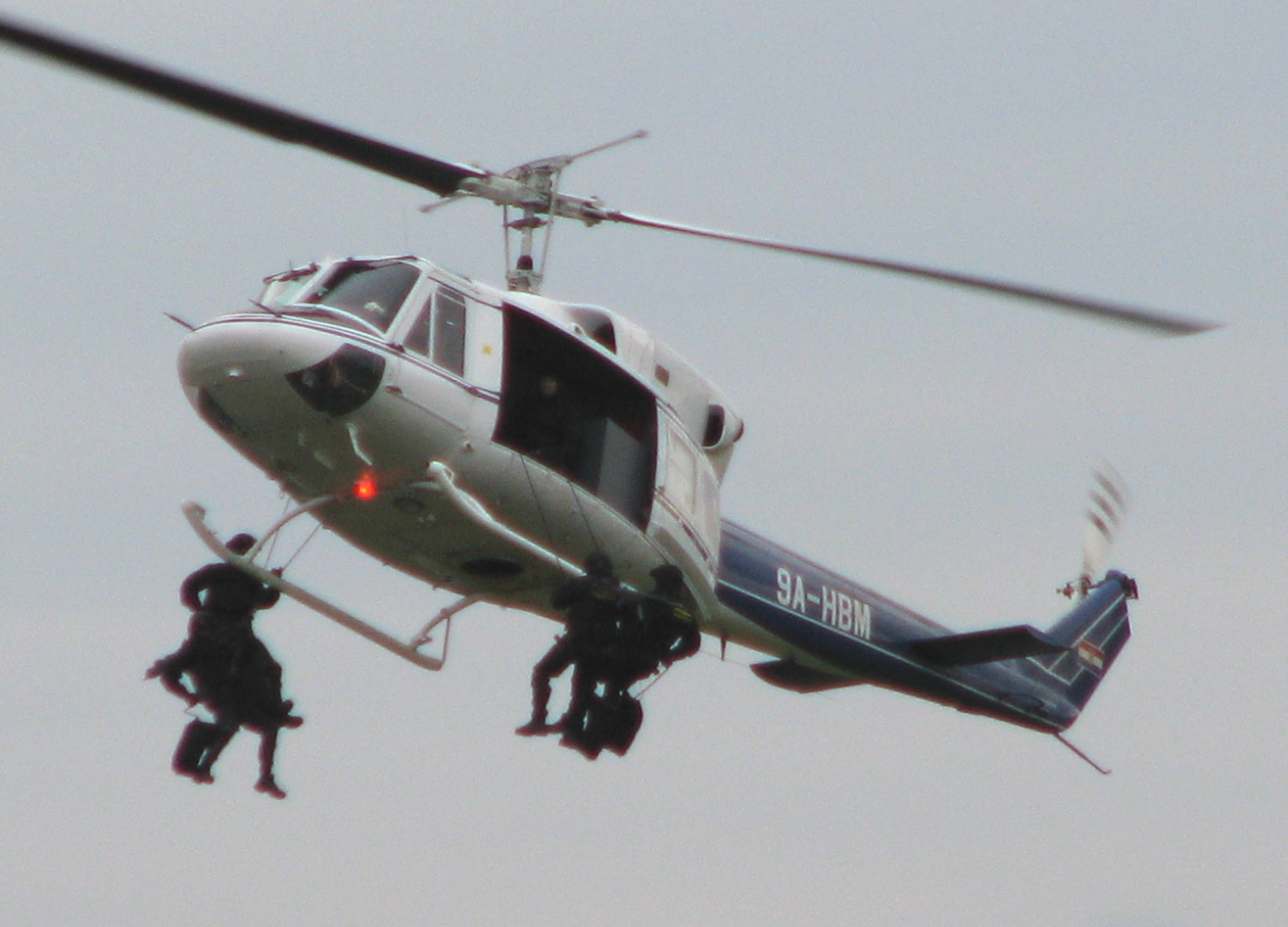
Lučko ATU members rappelling from a helicopter at the Lučko Air Show

Lučko ATU is stationed in Lučko, near Zagreb, the capital of Croatia. As of 2015, the unit numbered 130 police officers, most of whom have college education. Applicants, who must already be police officers with at least four years of experience, are required to pass a demanding battery of tests, and only around 5% are admitted to a 12-month training regimen necessary to join the unit. Like the rest of the Croatian police force, the unit is under command of the Croatian Ministry of the Interior. It answers to the Minister of the Interior, and is only deployed on their direct command.

The unit's specialisations are anti-terrorist actions, actions against organised crime, high-risk arrests, building assaults, hostage situations and negotiations (including aircraft hijackings). Lučko ATU also provides police protection to local and visiting state officials, and has done so during visits to Croatia of George W. Bush, Vladimir Putin, Joe Biden, Donald Tusk and Popes John Paul II and Benedict XVI.

Lučko ATU is a member of the ATLAS Network of European police tactical units, and also trains with American SWAT teams.

=== Equipment ===
Lučko ATU members are armed with pistols (including models of Croatian firearms manufacturer HS Produkt), submachine guns, assault rifles, shotguns and optionally sniper rifles, and authorised to use armoured cars and helicopters. Lučko ATU's air unit, stationed at the Lučko Airport, numbers thirty pilots and mechanics, and the unit is reportedly able to reach any part of Croatia within 30 minutes.

== Notable members ==
Professional mixed martial artist Mirko "Cro Cop" Filipović was a member of the Lučko Anti-Terrorist Unit. He wore his Croatian special police uniform at press conferences, leading to his mixed martial arts nickname "Cro Cop".

Robert Zadro (son of Blago Zadro, a notable commander who died during battle of Vukovar), one of the first ATU Lučko members, took part and survived the battle of Vukovar, killed during Battle of Kupres.

Seven generals of the Croatian Army were previously members: Slavko Butorac, Miljenko Filipović, Mladen Markač, Mirko Norac, Ante Roso, Željko Sačić and Stanko Sopta.
