= Lučko =

Neighbourhood of Zagreb

- Village
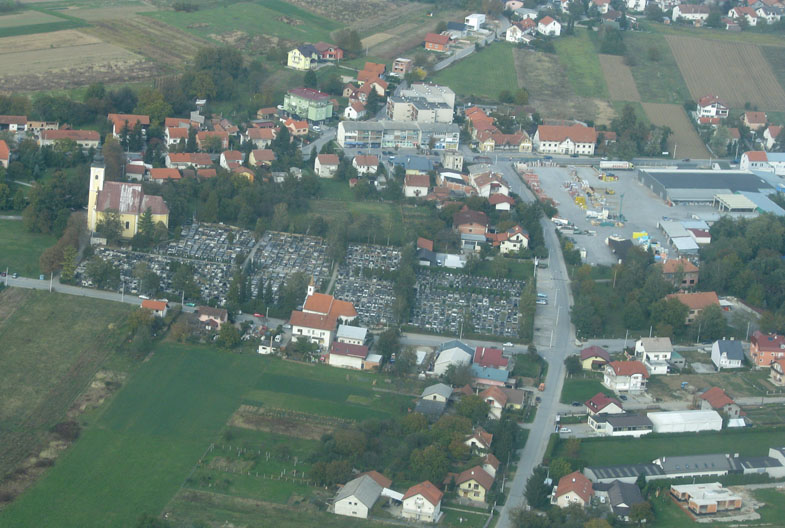
- View from the air

- Location within Croatia
- Coordinates: 45.761°N 15.883°E
- Country: Croatia
- County: City of Zagreb
- City District: Novi Zagreb – zapad

Area
  - Total: 1.0 sq mi (2.6 km^{2})

Population (2021)
  - Total: 2,987
  - Density: 3,000/sq mi (1,100/km^{2})
- Time zone: UTC+1 (CET)
  - Summer (DST): UTC+2 (CEST)
- Website: http://www.lucko.info/

Lučko is a settlement in the Novi Zagreb - zapad district of the city of Zagreb, located south of the Sava and southwest of the city center. Lučko is located near the Lučko interchange that connects the A1 motorway, the Zagreb bypass and the D1 and D3 state roads towards Karlovac, colloquially called "the old road to Karlovac". The two main economic activities in Lučko are trade in goods, mainly in the retail sector, and the rendering of commercial services.

== History ==
Lučko dates back to the 18th century, when it was noted as the first local village with a river crossing. The name derives from the Croatian word luka which translates to "harbor". The oldest church in the village can be traced back to the year 1779. As of the 2011 census, Lučko had a total population of 3,010. This corresponds to a population increase of 50% when compared to the census held in 1991.

== Demographics ==
According to the 2021 census, its population was 2,987. According to the 2011 census, it had 3,010 inhabitants.

== Lučko Airport ==
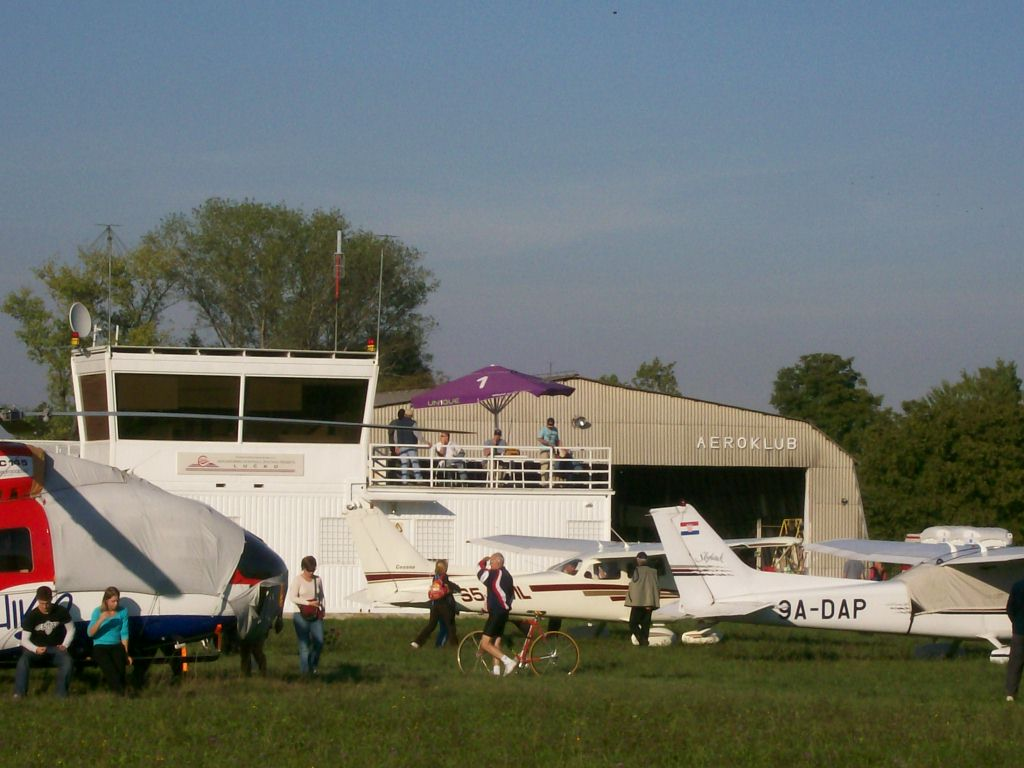
Lučko Airport

The Lučko airport (ICAO: LDZL) is one of the oldest facilities in Lučko and one of the main reasons for the establishment of Lučko as a neighborhood. In 1947, it had become Zagreb's main airport, replacing the obsolete Borongaj airport. It remained Zagreb's main airport for 15 years, up to the year 1962, when Zagreb Airport had been completed at its contemporary location near Pleso. Lučko airport includes two parallel, unsurfaced runways with a length of 850 meters (2,789 ft).

Today, Lučko airport is home to the Lučko Anti-Terrorist Unit, Croatia's special police unit. In addition, it serves as a sport airfield and military helicopter airbase.

The airport is maintained by Aeroklub Zagreb, a local airport operator based in Zagreb.

== Motorway interchange ==
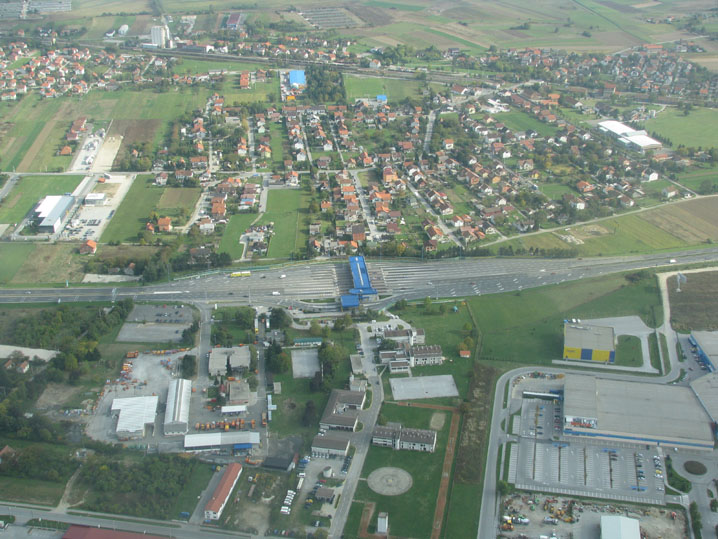
Lučko toll plaza from the air, Hrvatski Leskovac is also seen

The Croatian A1 motorway passes south of Lučko. The interchange from where the A1 originates is named after Lučko. Nearby Lučko mainline toll plaza consists of 15 lanes. It is the most frequented toll plaza in Croatia. During the tourist season long lines of vehicles form at the toll station. An additional 10-lane toll plaza has been built and opened in Demerje shortly before the 2009 summer season, only 3 kilometres (1.9 mi) away from the Lučko toll plaza.

== Sports ==
Local football club NK Lučko played one season in the Croatian top tier and play their home games at the Stadion Lučko.
