= Mladen Markač =

Croatian retired general (born 1955)

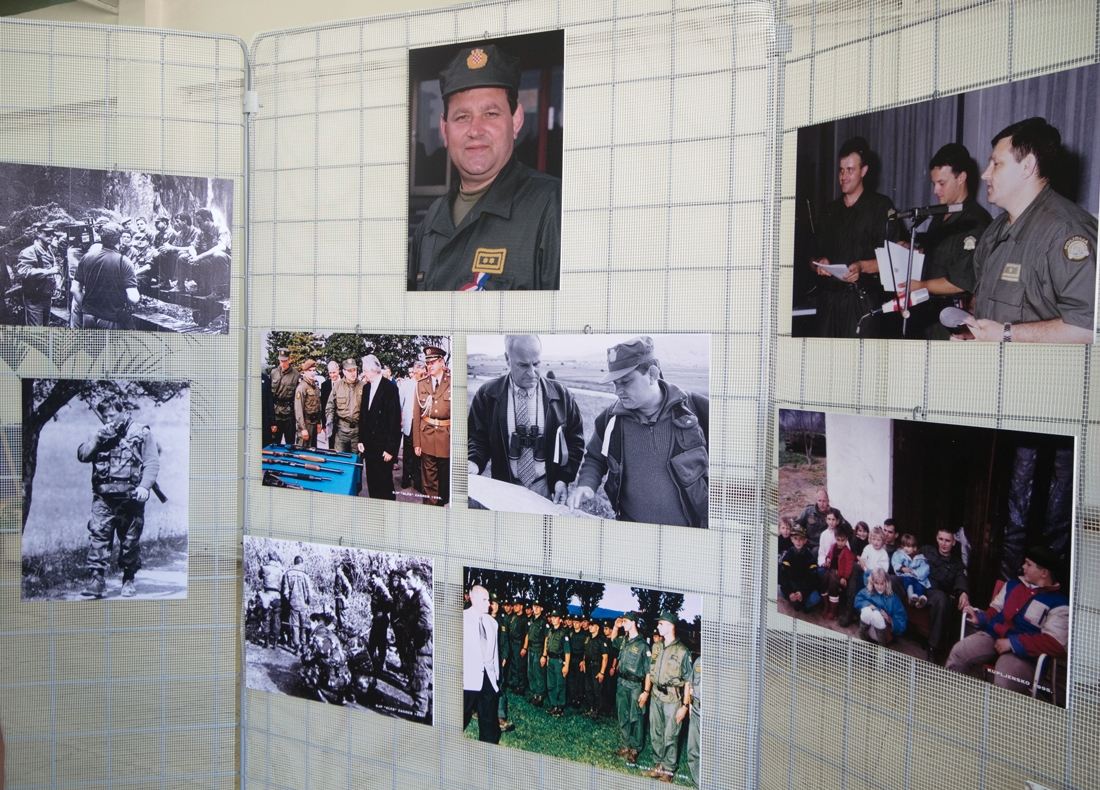
- Photographs of general Mladen Markač at an exhibition in the Police Academy in Zagreb
- Born: 8 May 1955 (age 71); Đurđevac, PR Croatia, FPR Yugoslavia
- Military career
- Allegiance: Yugoslavia (1983–1990) Croatia (1990–1996)
- Branch: Special police
- Service years: 1983–1996
- Rank: Colonel general
- Commands: Lučko Anti-Terrorist Unit
- Conflicts: Croatian War of Independence Operation Flash Operation Storm

Mladen Markač (pronounced [mlâdɛn mârkatʃ]; born 8 May 1955) is a Croatian retired general. He was a Commander of Croatian Special Police during Operation Storm during the Croatian War of Independence (1991–1995), and afterwards held the rank of Colonel General. Later, he was indicted by the International Criminal Tribunal for the Former Yugoslavia (ICTY) for war crimes committed during Operation Storm by Croatian forces against the Serbs from Croatia. In April 2011, in a joint trial with Croatian generals Ante Gotovina and Ivan Čermak, the ICTY found him guilty and sentenced him to 18 years. Gotovina received 24 years while Čermak was acquitted.

On 16 November 2012, his and Gotovina's conviction was overturned on all charges by the appeals panel at the ICTY, and he was immediately set free to a hero's welcome in Croatia.

== Early life and career ==
Mladen Markač was born in 1955 in Đurđevac, People's Republic of Croatia, then part of the Federal People's Republic of Yugoslavia (FPRY). In 1981, he graduated from the Faculty of Kinesiology, University of Zagreb, and in 1982, he completed his compulsory military service. He then joined the police force of the SFRY Ministry of the Interior.

In 1990, Markač and others established a police unit for special tasks in the Ministry of the Interior. He was appointed Deputy Commander and in late 1990, this unit became the Lučko Anti-Terrorist Unit. In 1991, Mladen Markač was appointed the head of the Lučko Anti-Terrorist Unit. In 1992, he was promoted to the rank of Colonel General (reserve).

== Croatian War ==
On 18 February 1994, Mladen Markač was appointed Commander of the Special Police of the Ministry of the Interior of the Republic of Croatia (the "Special Police"), which gave him overall authority and responsibility for the operation and functioning of the Special Police. He was also Assistant Minister of the Interior for Special Police. As Commander of the Special Police, Markač controlled all members of the Special Police who were involved in Operation Storm and the related continuing operations in that region. The participating Special Police force was composed of individuals from special purpose units, including the Lučko Anti-Terrorist Unit, the Special Police logistics department and a Ministry of Interior communications company, as well as individuals from Special Police units from various District Police Administrations throughout Croatia.

According to the ICTY indictment, he could command his subordinates, and also had the material ability to prevent persons under his authority from committing crimes and to punish his subordinates for any crimes that they committed. He also had the ability to recommend or propose disciplinary measures against members of the Special Police who were subordinated to his command during the operation.

== Indictment and trial ==
Along with Ante Gotovina and Ivan Čermak, he was indicted by the International Criminal Tribunal for the Former Yugoslavia in the Hague on charges of operating a joint criminal enterprise for the purpose of permanently removing the Serb population from the Krajina by force and of crimes against humanity. In March 2004, Markač voluntarily surrendered and was transferred to the ICTY in The Hague.

On 15 April 2011, Mladen Markač was found guilty by the ICTY and sentenced to 18 years in jail for war crimes, including murder, persecution and plunder.

=== Appeal ===
In a three-to-two majority opinion, the appeals panel rendered a not guilty verdict on 16 November 2012. The presiding judge was Theodor Meron, who proclaimed the verdict. The previous verdict sentenced him to 18 years in prison, while Ante Gotovina was sentenced to 24 years and Ivan Čermak was acquitted. Both Gotovina and Markač were accused of being part of the "criminal enterprise", but Meron concluded that "there was no such conspiracy".

The night before, candle-lit vigils were held across Croatia, including at Roman Catholic churches, while several thousand people were expected to watch a live 9:00 broadcast on a giant screen in Zagreb's Ban Jelačić Square. A leader of the war veterans' association, Josip Klemm, said: "We want to show our support for our generals and we are waiting with them for the verdict." Roman Catholic bishop Vlado Košić called on his flock to "raise their voice against injustice regarding the generals and Croatia" and to pray "for a fair verdict."

Many veterans, some of whom wore their uniforms and carried the coat of arms of their units or the flag of Croatia, marched from Zagreb's Mirogoj cemetery to the Zagreb Cathedral. Another veterans' association leader, Ilija Vucemilovic, said: "It has to be clear who were the victims, and from where those who killed, destroyed and raped came. This was not the verdict against our generals, but against all of us, our children and our future." After his release, the Croatian government sent a plane for Markač and Gotovina and they were greeted by the minister of defence Ante Kotromanović and minister of veterans, Predrag Matić. When Gotovina and Markač arrived in Zagreb, they were greeted by the Croatian officials, including the Prime Minister. Around 100,000 people cheered when they arrived for them at the Ban Jelačić Square in the capital. During a speech, Markač addressed the mass, saying: "I have always carried the homeland in my heart, and the homeland are you." After making a speech at the square, a procession was held for the generals after which they were greeted by the cardinal, Josip Bozanić. At Zagreb Cathedral, a mass was held for the event. After the mass, Markač and Gotovina were received by the president at the Presidential Palace.

Markač's acquittal made international reactions. Croatian Prime Minister Zoran Milanović said that release of Markač and Gotovina is important for whole Croatia and thanked them for "enduring so much for Croatia." The President, Ivo Josipović, said that Markač and Gotovina spent eight years in prison while innocent and thanked them for their sacrifice for Croatia. Ivan Šimonović, former Croatian minister of justice and present assistant of the UN's Secretary General Ban Ki-moon, said that this verdict will have an important role in interpretation of certain regulations and in definition of the standard of the international criminal law. Mirjan Damaška, a law professor at Yale University, stated he was pleased but not just because of Gotovina and Markač, but because the theory about the "joint criminal enterprise" would have historical, political and legal complications for Croatia.

The media in Serbia described Markač's and Gotovina's release as "scandalous". The Government of Serbia expressed its indignation with the court's decision. However, Veselin Šljivančanin, a former officer of the Yugoslav People's Army convicted of war crimes perpetrated during the Battle of Vukovar, congratulated both generals on their release, blaming the politicians for what he calls war crimes committed during the Operation Storm, namely the president Franjo Tuđman. Reactions in Bosnia and Herzegovina were mixed. The president of the Federation of Bosnia and Herzegovina, Živko Budimir, congratulated Gotovina and Markač on their "another victory" referring to them as "respected comrades, dear friends, our heroes." The president of the Croatian Democratic Union of Bosnia and Herzegovina, a major party amongst the Croats of Bosnia and Herzegovina, Dragan Čović, said he was overjoyed with the release of Gotovina and Markač. Milorad Dodik, President of Republika Srpska, said politics played a major role in the ICTY decision, adding that "this is a humiliating decision for all the victims, for all Serbs". Rhodri C. Williams, a human rights consultant, stated "to treat the Gotovina judgment as an absolution of Croatia's well-documented sins is patently absurd and will only complicate the way to a long overdue regional reckoning with the past. Ultimately, Croatia can only legitimise its own narrative of victimhood by recognising the validity of those of its victims."

== After release ==
On 2 December, Markač and Gotovina were named honorary citizens of Osijek. On 5 December, at a lecture in Matica hrvatska about the Croatian War of Independence, Markač announced he would dedicate himself to humanitarian work and spreading what he described as the truth about the war.
