= Gornje Leskovice =

- Village (Selo)
- Location within Serbia
- Coordinates: 44°09′N 19°51′E
- Country: Serbia
- District: Kolubara District
- Municipality: Valjevo

Population (2002)
  - Total: 463
- Time zone: UTC+1 (CET)
  - Summer (DST): UTC+2 (CEST)

Gornje Leskovice is a village in the municipality of Valjevo, Serbia. According to the 2002 census, the village has a population of 463 people.

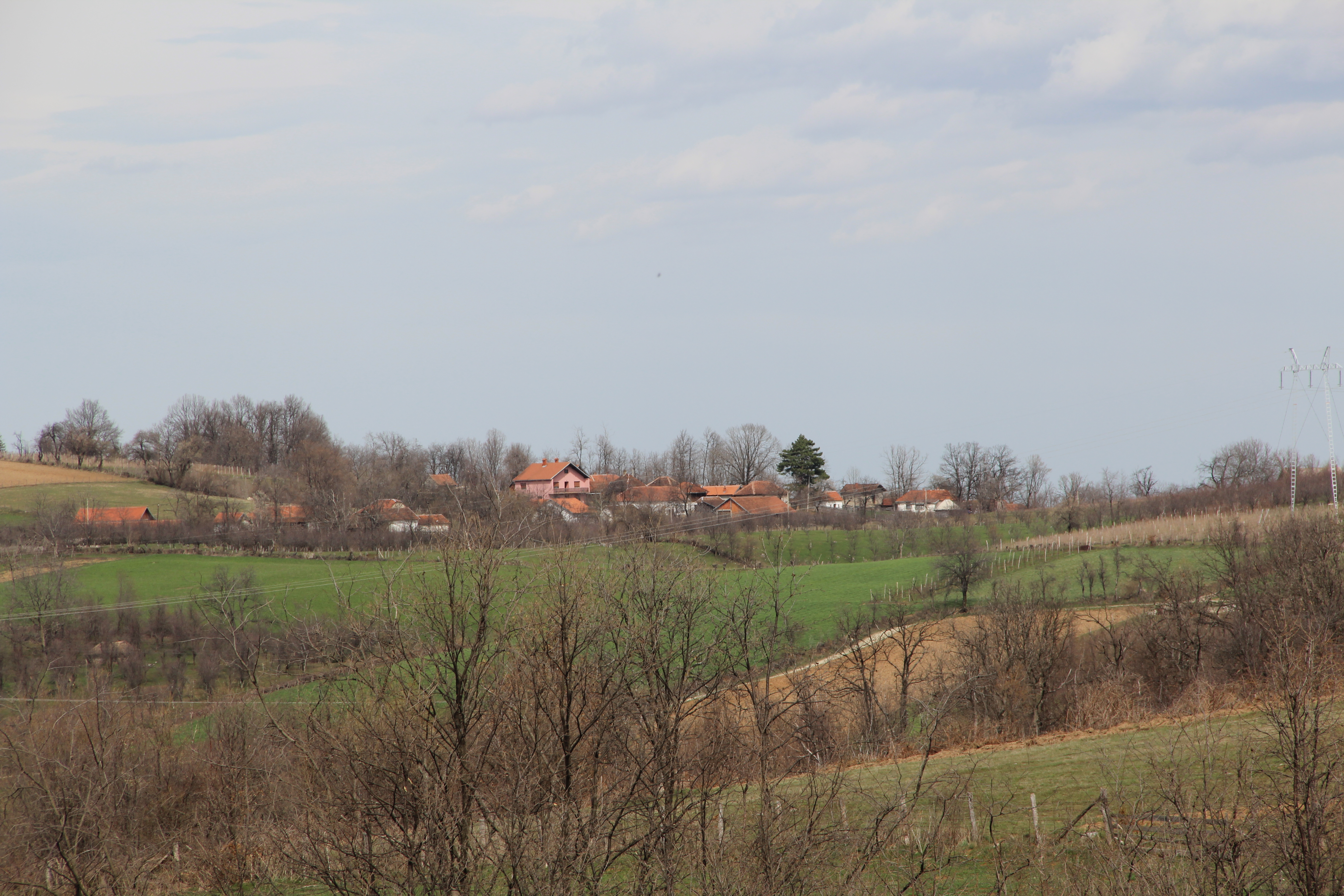
Gornje Leskovice - Panorama

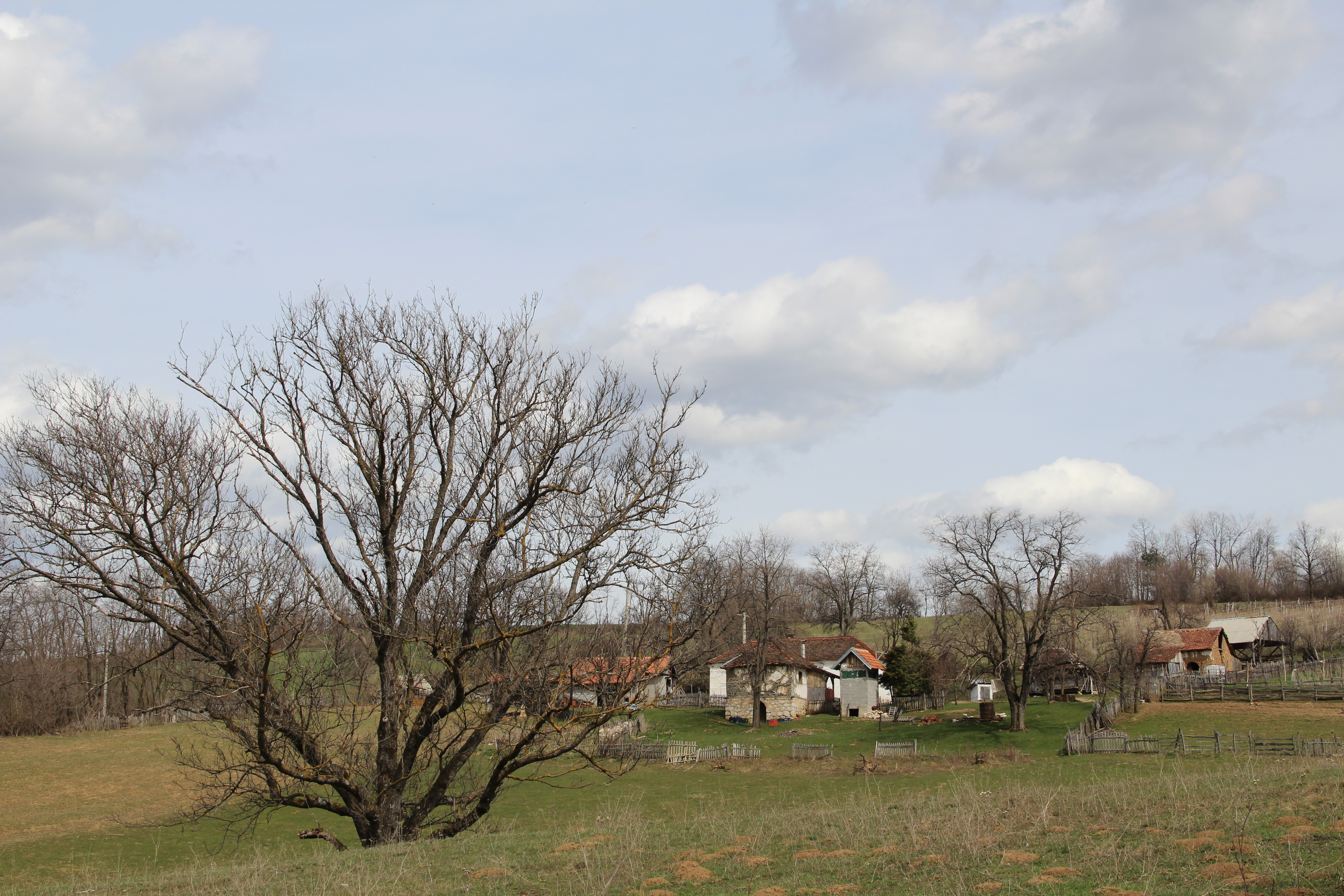
Gornje Leskovice - Panorama

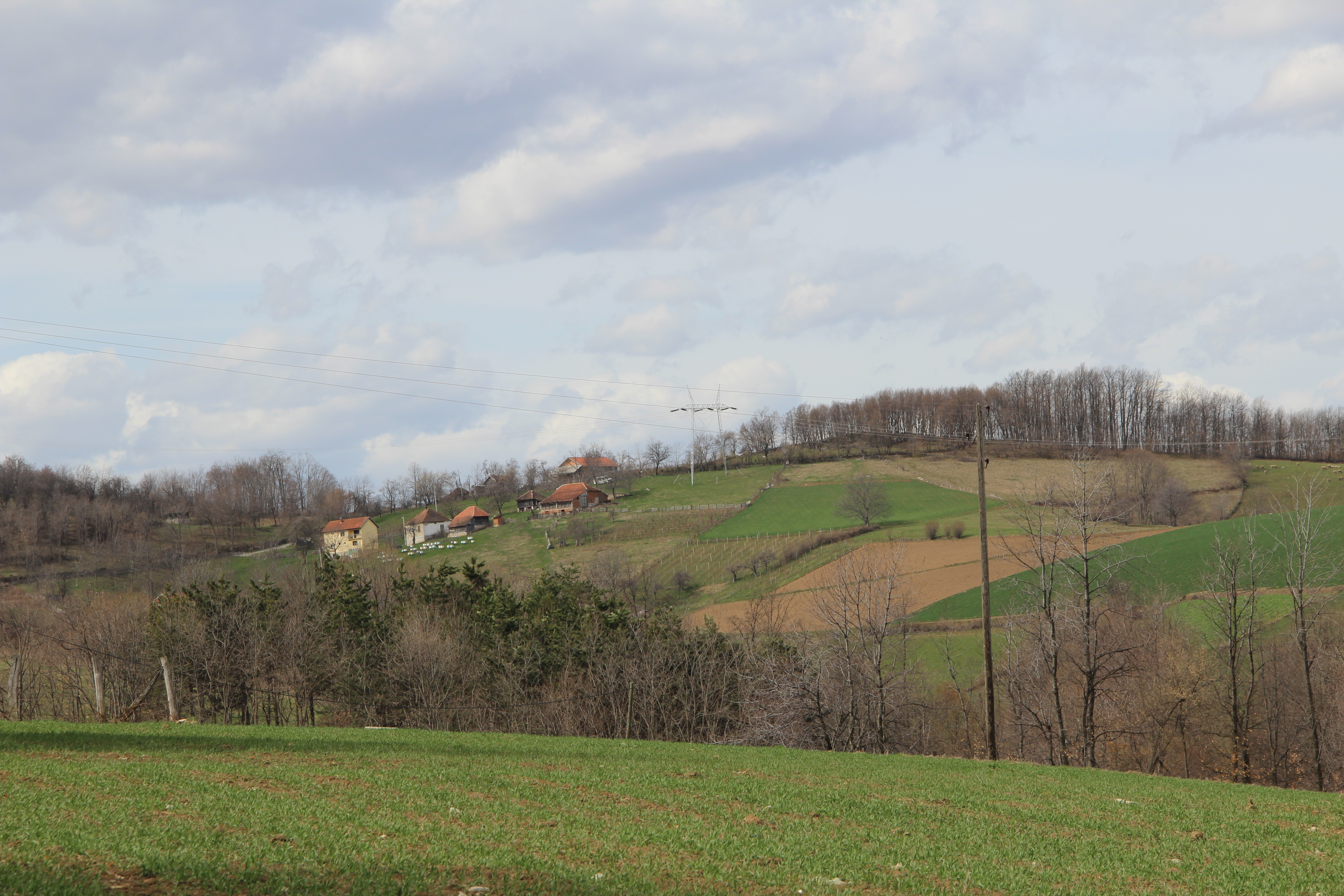
Gornje Leskovice - Panorama

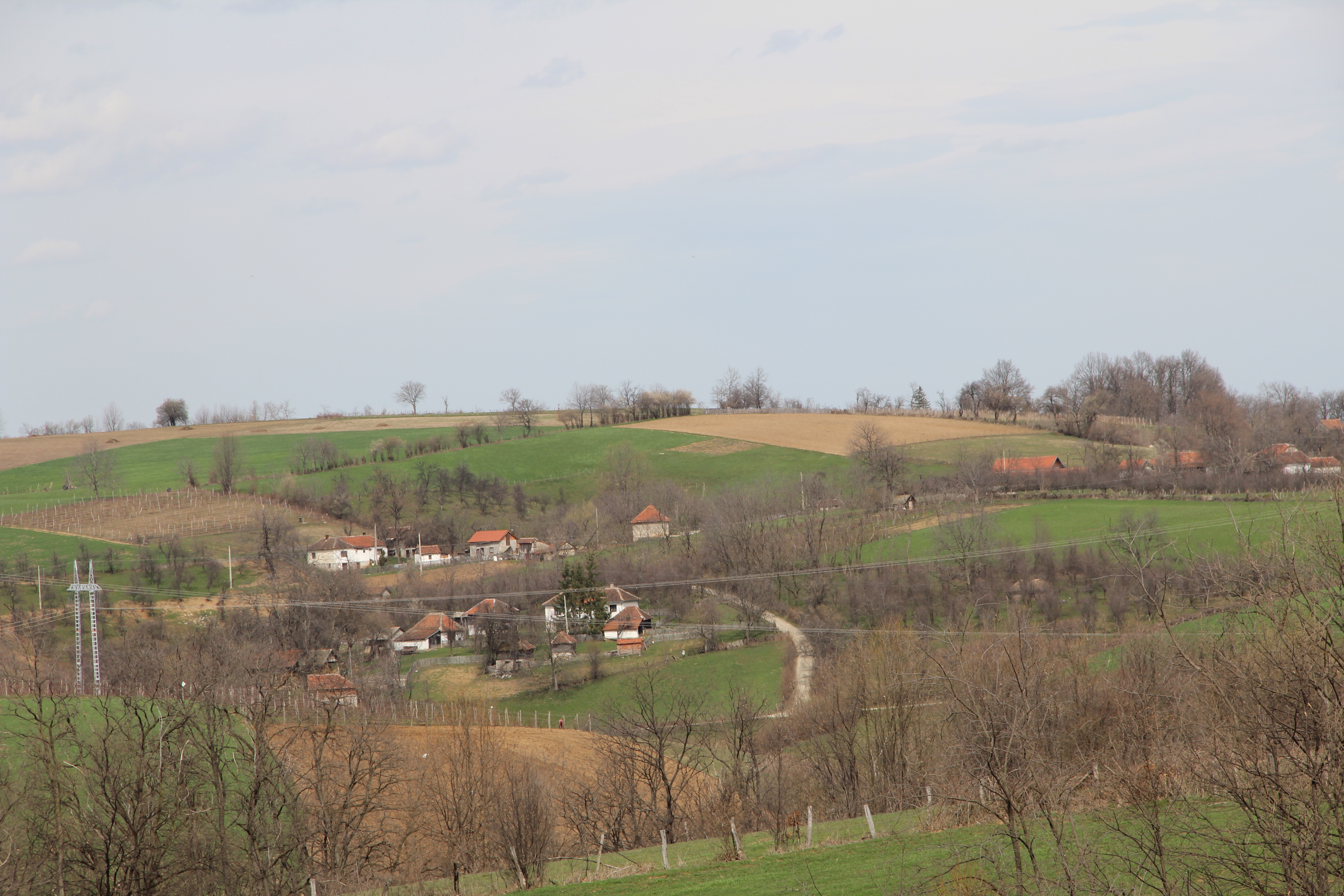
Gornje Leskovice - Panorama

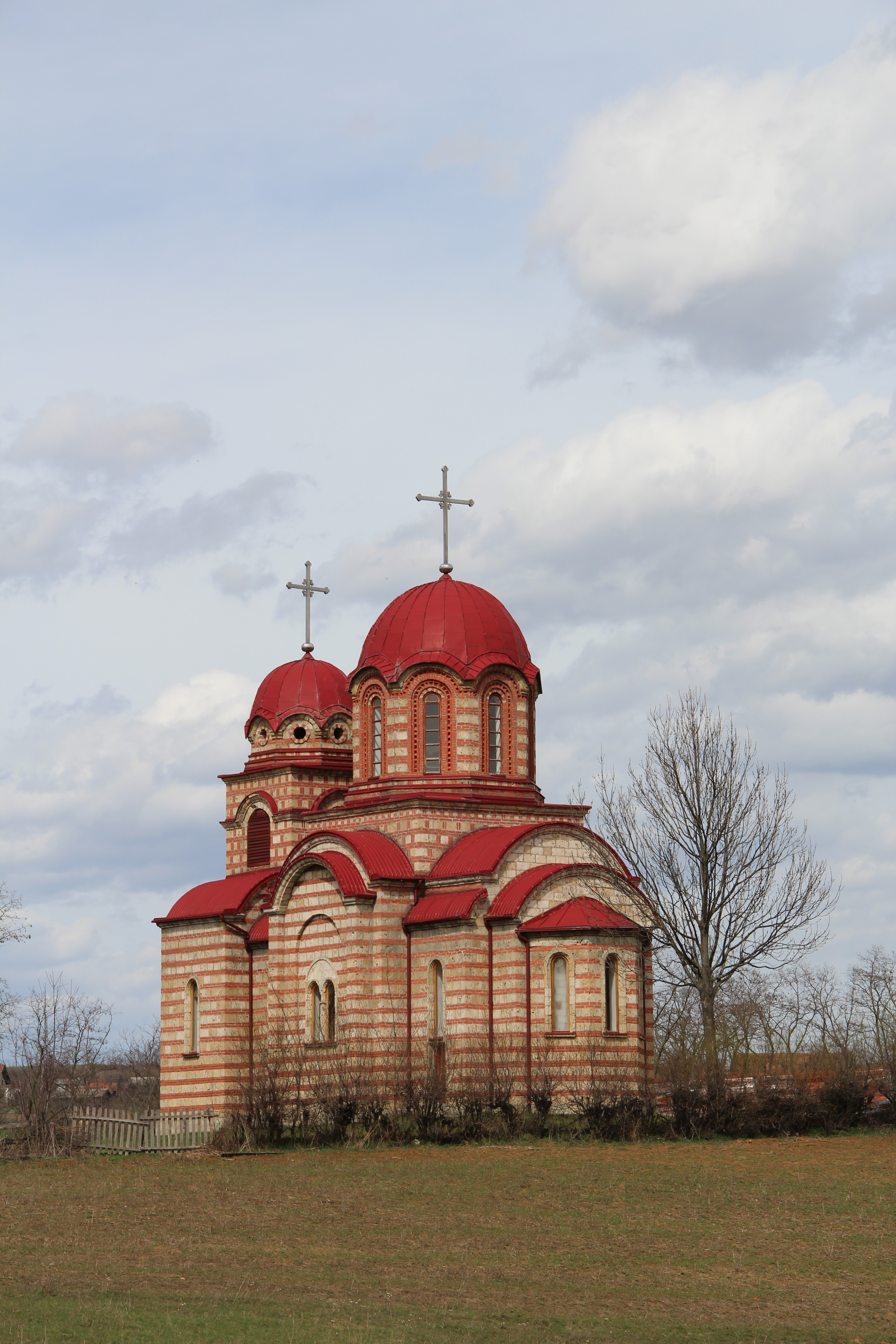
Gornje Leskovice - Church

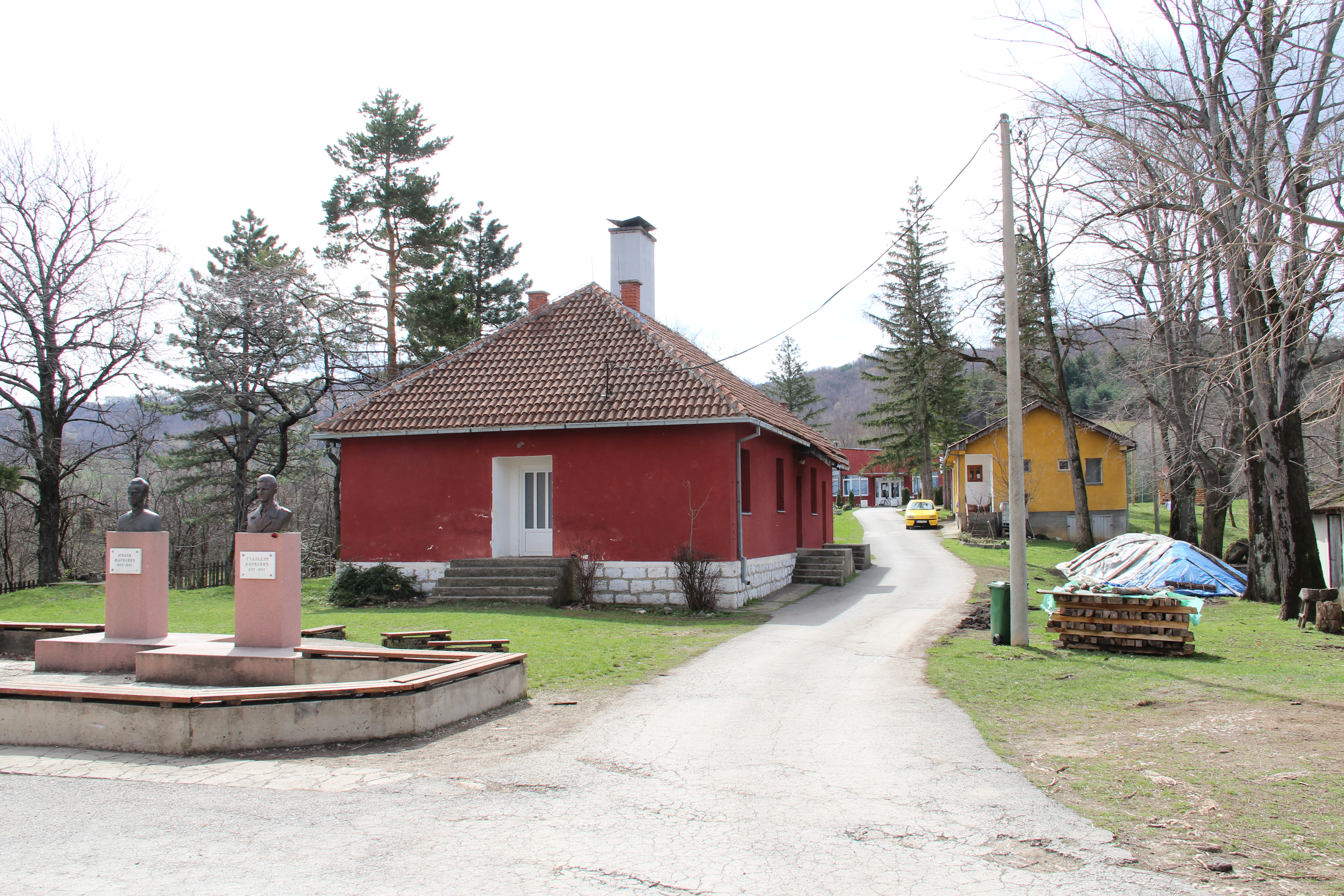
Gornje Leskovice - School

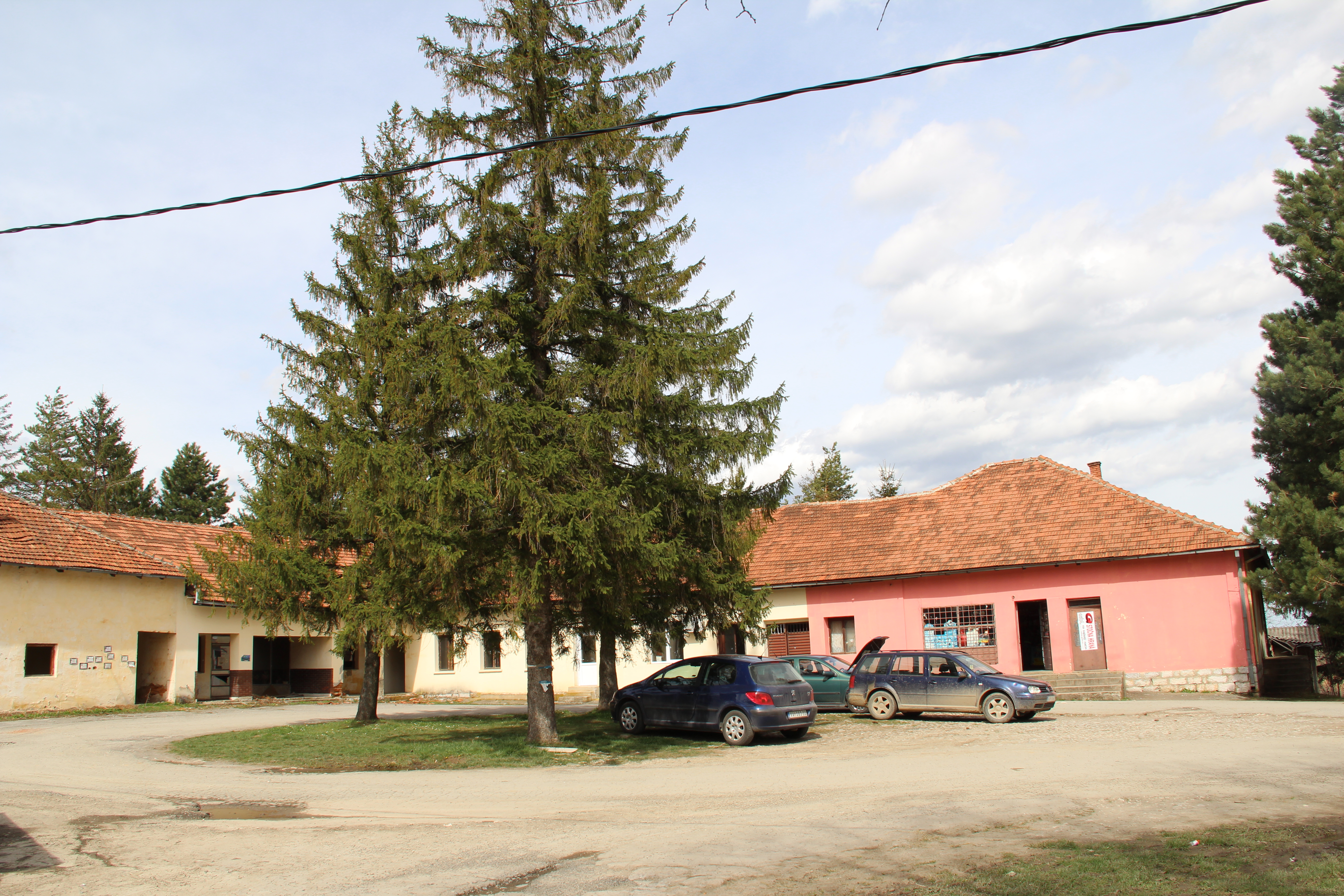
Gornje Leskovice - Centre

== Notable people ==
- Serbian soldier Stojadin Mirković (1972–1991) was born in the village
