= Risto Matković =

Serb lawyer and politician (born 1947)

- Ристо Матковић

Prime Minister of the Republic of Serbian Krajina
- Acting
- In office 16 February 1992 – 26 February 1992
- President: Mile Paspalj (acting)
- Preceded by: Dušan Vještica
- Succeeded by: Zdravko Zečević

Personal details
- Born: 23 December 1947 (age 78) Fojnica (Gacko), SFR Yugoslavia
- Party: SDS
- Education: Mostar Gymnasium
- Alma mater: University of Sarajevo
- Occupation: Lawyer and politician

Risto Matković (Serbian: Ристо Матковић; born 23 December 1947) is a former Serb lawyer and politician. A member of the Serb Democratic Party, he served as acting prime minister of the Republic of Serbian Krajina in February 1992.

== Biography ==
Risto Matković was born in Fojnica, near Gacko. He completed elementary school in his hometown, the Mostar Gymnasium, and the University of Sarajevo Faculty of Law. He was briefly employed at the PTT Service Company in Sarajevo, and in 1976 he moved to Knin. He worked at Elektra, the "Stevo Opačić" Brickworks in Strmica, and the Legal Service of the Knin Railway Transport Company, and was then appointed a judge at the Municipal Court in Drniš.

During the worsening of interethnic relations in 1990, he returned to Knin and became secretary, and then president of the Municipal Assembly of Knin in 1991. He was one of the vice presidents of the Government of the SAO Krajina from 21 December 1990 to 19 December 1991, when it was renamed the Republic of Serbian Krajina.

He was appointed Minister of Justice and acting prime minister of the Republic of Serbian Krajina in February 1992.

After being dismissed from his prime ministerial and ministerial positions and removed from municipal authorities, he was appointed president of the Knin District Court on 9 June 1993. He was an advisor to the president of the Republic of Serbian Krajina Milan Martić on legal and religious issues.

He has lived in Serbia since 1995. He briefly practiced law in Belgrade, and in 1997 he was appointed judge of the Municipal Court in Ada. After leaving his judicial position, he returned to practicing law. He lives in Ada as a pensioner.

Political offices
| Preceded by Dušan Vještica | Prime Minister of the Republic of Serbian Krajina; Acting; 1992 | Succeeded by Zdravko Zečević |
