= Serbian Radical Party in the Republic of Serbian Krajina =

Serbian Radical Party in the Republic of Serbian Krajina Српска радикална странка у Републици Српској Крајини Srpska radikalna stranka u Republici Srpskoj Krajini
- Abbreviation: SRS RSK
- Leader: Vojislav Šešelj
- President: Rade Leskovac
- Founded: 13 May 1992
- Dissolved: 1997
- Succeeded by: Party of Danube Serbs
- Headquarters: Vukovar
- Ideology: Ultranationalism; Serbian nationalism; Serbian irredentism
- Political position: Right-wing
- Colours: Blue
- Croatian Parliament: 0 / 127
- Serbian Krajina National Assembly: 16 / 85

The Serbian Radical Party in the Republic of Serbian Krajina (Serbian: Српска радикална странка у Републици Српској Крајини, romanized: Srpska radikalna stranka u Republici Srpskoj Krajini, abbr. SRS RSK) was the branch in Croatia of the Serbian Radical Party.

== History ==
The SRS RSK was founded on 13 May 1992 at the assembly in Vukovar. Local committees for the party were soon established in Slavonia, Baranja, Dalmatia, Lika, Kordun, and Banovina. On 15 November, the board for the Serbian Radical Party for the Serbian region of Western Slavonia was founded in Okučani.

In the parliamentary elections held in the Republic of Serbian Krajina, the SRS RSK won 16 out of the 85 seats in the Serbian Krajina National Assembly. The SRS RSK has publicly supported the Serb Democratic Party. During the general elections, the party continuously supported the SDS's candidate, Milan Babić. Rade Leskovac ran in the election but only got 26,523 votes in the first round.

On 4 February 1995, the parties president, Rade Leskovac, was removed as the president by the executive board of the Serbian Radical Party in the Republic of Srpska Krajina and was also removed from the Serbian Radical Party for attempting to separate sections within it. Branko Vojnica was made the new president.

The party was dissolved in 1997, and after the reintegration of the Eastern Slavonia, Baranja and Western Syrmia into Croatia in 1998, another party by the name of the Party of Danube Serbs was established by Rade Leskovac on 27 February 1998. The Party was erased from Register of political parties sometime between 2012 and 2015.

== Electoral result ==
=== Presidential elections ===
President of the Republic of Serbian Krajina
Election year	Candidate	1st Round		2nd Round		Results
Election year	Candidate	# Votes	% Votes	# Votes	% Votes	Results
1993–1994	Rade Leskovac	26,523	11.4%	—N/a		Lost ✗

== See also ==
- Party of Danube Serbs
