= Kukar =

Village In Croatia

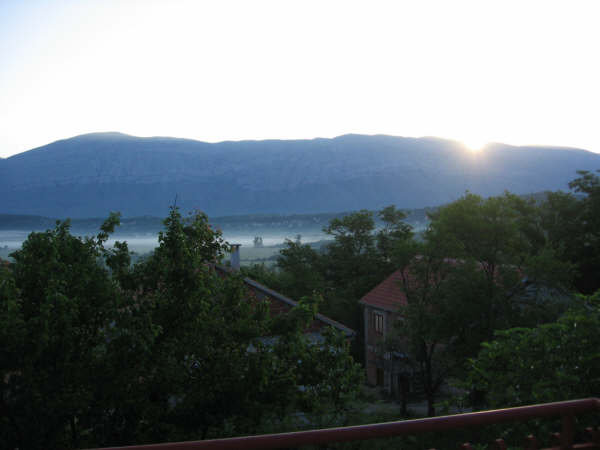
View of Dinara mountain range from Kukar.

Kukar is a small village in Croatia located approximately 3 km from the town of Vrlika under the mountain Dinara. It was part of the Vrlika municipality.

== History ==
The history of the village of Kukar is closely tied with the history of the town and municipality of Vrlika.

== Notable people ==
Krajina president and prime minister, as well as SDP president Milan Babić, was born in Kukar in 1956, when it was part of the SFR Yugoslavia.
