= Serbian Radical Party (disambiguation) =

The Serbian Radical Party (SRS) is a Serbian nationalist party in Serbia.

It may also refer to:

Historical parties

- People's Radical Party, Serbian and Yugoslav party active between 1881 and 1945.
- Serb People's Radical Party, Serb minority party in Austria-Hungary.
- Yugoslav Radical Union, Yugoslav party active between 1934 and 1941, led by Milan Stojadinović.
- Serbian Radical Party in the Republic of Serbian Krajina, Serb minority party in Croatia active between 1992 and 1997.

Other current parties

- Serbian Radical Party of Republika Srpska, party in Bosnia and Herzegovina.
- SRS "Dr. Vojislav Šešelj", party in Bosnia and Herzegovina.
- Party of Serb Radicals, Serb minority party in Montenegro.

== See also ==
- Serb People's Party (disambiguation), several parties
