= Dubajić =

Dubajić (Serbian Cyrillic: Дубајић) is a Serbian surname. It may refer to:

- Simo Dubajić (1923–2009), Serbian soldier
- Slobodan Dubajić (born 1963), retired Serbian footballer
- Bojan Dubajić (born 1990), Serbian footballer

== See also ==
- Dubić, similar surname
