= Simo Dubajić =

Simo Š. Dubajić
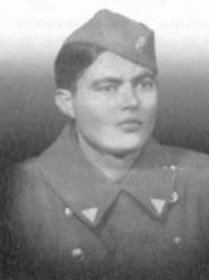
- Born: 1 September 1923; Kistanje, Kingdom of Serbs, Croats and Slovenes
- Died: 8 July 2009 (aged 85); Belgrade, Serbia
- Burial place: New Bežanija Cemetery, Belgrade
- Military career
- Allegiance: SFR Yugoslavia; SAO Krajina
- Branch: 4th Army of Yugoslavia
- Rank: Major, Lieutenant colonel

Simo Dubajić (September 1, 1923 – July 8, 2009) was a Yugoslav Partisan soldier. A Serb from Croatia, he gained prominence by being involved in inter-ethnic conflicts between Croats and Serbs on two occasions, once during World War II and again during the first stages of the Croatian War of Independence.

== Biography ==
Dubajić was born in the village of Kistanje near Knin. When World War II broke out, he joined the partisan resistance movement, and advanced in ranks to the rank of major. At the end of the war, Dubajić was the commander of a mechanized squad of the 4th Army of Yugoslavia (the Croatian branch of the Yugoslav National Liberation Army, led by Lieutenant General Petar Drapšin). In the spring of 1945, they were stationed in the region of Kočevje in Slovenia, where they were reportedly involved in the Bleiburg repatriations.

After the war Dubajić retired as a potpukovnik (lieutenant colonel) of the Yugoslav People's Army. In the 1950s he studied arts in Zagreb and acted in the movie Družina Sinjeg galeba. He also assisted numerous film directors.

In the 1990s with the breakup of Yugoslavia, Dubajić became one of the leaders of Serb armed militias in the Dalmatian hinterland (in the so-called Log Revolution), and circumstantial evidence points to a group led by him having perpetrated a November 1990 murder of a Croatian police officer. He was active in the creation of the Republic of Serbian Krajina during the Croatian War of Independence before moving to Belgrade in 1991. Dubajić was allegedly courted by Vuk Drašković to lead his Serbian Guard which was active in Slavonia.

In 2006, Dubajić published a book entitled Život, grijeh i kajanje: Od Kistanja do Kočevskog roga where he talked about the World War II Kočevski Rog massacre.

In March 2009, Dubajić was indicted by the Zagreb County State Attorney's Office of war crimes during World War II. At least 13,000 people are alleged to have been killed at the site by soldiers under Dubajić's command from May 26 to June 5, 1945.

Dubajić died in Belgrade, on July 8, 2009, after a long illness.
