= Zelenbaba =

Zelenbaba (Serbian Cyrillic: Зеленбаба) is a Serbian surname, derived from a nickname (zeleno, "green", baba, "grandmother"), traditionally found in the area of Knin (in Croatia).

- Vladimir Zelenbaba (born 1982), Serbian footballer
- Dušan Zelenbaba (born 1952), Serbian-Croatian politician
