= Log Revolution =

1990–1991 fighting in Croatia

- Part of the breakup of Yugoslavia and the prelude to the Croatian War of Independence
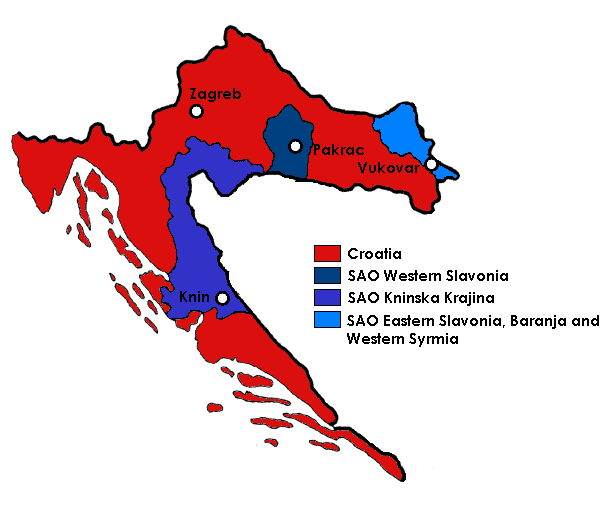
- A map of all three self-proclamied proto break-away states of Krajina
- Date: August 17 – December 19, 1990
- Location: Croatia, SFR Yugoslavia
- Caused by: The 1990 election; Conflict of Serbian nationalism and Croatian nationalism
- Goals: To secede and create their own autonomous state in Croatia
- Result: Paramilitary victory: Establishment of SAO Krajina, SAO Western Slavonia, and the SAO Eastern Slavonia, Baranja and Western Syrmia

Parties
(Republic of Serbian Krajina) Paramilitaries associated with Serb Democratic Party (Croatia)	Croatia

Lead figures
(Republic of Serbian Krajina) Milan Martić (Republic of Serbian Krajina) Milan Babić (Republic of Serbian Krajina) Jovan Rašković (Republic of Serbian Krajina) Simo Dubajić	(Socialist Republic of Croatia) Franjo Tuđman (Socialist Republic of Croatia) Stjepan Mesić (Socialist Republic of Croatia) Josip Boljkovac

Units involved
Local Serb Militia	Croatian Police

Number
Several hundred thousand	Unknown

Casualties and losses
None; Hundreds of militants arrested	2 policemen killed

The Log Revolution (Serbo-Croatian: Balvan revolucija / Балван револуција) was an insurrection which started on August 17, 1990, in areas of the Republic of Croatia which were populated significantly by ethnic Serbs. A full year of tension, including minor skirmishes and sabotage, passed before these events would escalate into the Croatian War of Independence.

== Background ==
In 1988–89, a series of street protests in Yugoslavia by supporters of Serbian leader Slobodan Milošević succeeded in overthrowing the government of the Socialist Republic of Montenegro as well as the governments of the Socialist Autonomous Provinces of Vojvodina and Kosovo, which were parts of the Socialist Republic of Serbia, replacing their leaders with allies of Milošević. The western Yugoslav republics of Slovenia and Croatia successfully resisted the attempts to expand the revolt onto their territories, and turned against Milošević. On 8 July 1989, a large Serb nationalist rally was held in Knin, during which banners threatening a Yugoslav People's Army (JNA) intervention in Croatia, as well as Chetnik iconography was displayed. In the lead up to the first free elections in April and May 1990, the ethnic relations between the Croats and the Serbs in SR Croatia became a subject of political debate.

The local Serbs in the village of Berak put up barricades in order to disrupt the elections. During the act of government transition from the former to the new authorities in Croatia, the JNA organized a "regular military maneuvre" in which a regiment of paratroopers was deployed to the Pleso Airport, which was taken as an implicit threat. On May 14, 1990, the weapons of the Territorial Defense (TO) of Croatia were taken away by the JNA, preventing the possibility of Croatia having its own weapons like it was done in Slovenia. According to Borisav Jović, then president of Yugoslavia, this action was done at the behest of the Republic of Serbia. This action left Croatia extremely vulnerable to pressure from Belgrade, whose leadership began to intensify their public challenges to Croatia's borders.

In an act of protest, the militant part of Croatian Serbs in some areas where they formed a majority started to refuse authority to the new Croatian government and beginning in early 1990 held several meetings and public rallies in support of their cause and in protest against the new government. These protests were in support of Serbian nationalism, a centralized Yugoslavia and Milošević (see Anti-bureaucratic revolution).

In June and July 1990, Serb representatives in Croatia openly rejected the new government's proposed amendments to the Constitution of SR Croatia which changed the name of the republic and entered new state symbols. The Serb population associated these with the symbols of the Nazi-allied Independent State of Croatia during World War II, although the Croatian checkerboard is a historical symbol that had already officially been contained in the emblem of the SR Croatia within Yugoslavia.

In the summer of 1990 the process of dissolution was ongoing, with the Croatian government implementing policies that were seen as openly nationalistic and anti-Serbian in nature, such as the removal of the Serbian Cyrillic script from correspondence in public offices. In late 1980s, a number of articles had been published in Serbia about a danger of Cyrillic being fully replaced by Latin, thereby endangering what was deemed a Serbian national symbol.

As tensions rose and war was becoming more imminent, Serbs in public institutions were forced to sign "loyalty sheets" to the new Croatian government, with refusal to do so resulting in immediate dismissal. The policy was especially noticeable in the Ministry of Internal Affairs, as some of the Serbs serving there were arrested for supporting Krajina Militia also known as Martić's Police. Pressure was also placed on Serb intellectuals like Jovan Rašković who promoted ideas of Greater Serbia.

== Blockades ==
Led by Milan Babić and Milan Martić, the local Serbs proclaimed SAO Kninska Krajina in August 1990 and began blockading roads connecting Dalmatia to the rest of Croatia. The blockade was mostly made from logs cut down from nearby woods, which is why the event was dubbed the "Log Revolution". The organizers were armed with illegal weapons supplied by Martić. Since it was a planned action, timed during the summer holiday season and severing land ties to the popular tourist region of Dalmatia, high economic damage was done to Croatian tourism.

The revolt was explained by the Serbs with words that they are "terrorized [by Croatian government]" and that they "[fight for] more cultural, language and education rights". Serbian newspaper "Večernje Novosti" wrote that "2.000.000 Serbs [are] ready to go to Croatia to fight". The Western diplomats commented that the Serbian media is inflaming passions and Croatian government said "We knew about the scenario to create confusion in Croatia...".

The minor skirmishes of the Log Revolution had apparently caused a police casualty in the night of November 22/23, 1990, a Croatian police car was fired upon on a hill near Obrovac and one of the policemen, 27-year-old Goran Alavanja, died of seven gunshot wounds. The incident involved three policemen of Serb ethnicity who were reportedly shot by a sole rebel Serb gunman, but the murder was never actually officially resolved. Circumstantial evidence points to a group led by Simo Dubajić having perpetrated the murder.

In another earlier incident near Petrinja, another Croatian policeman, Josip Božićević, was shot by a firearm in the night of September 28, 1990, and a leaked Ministry of Internal Affairs memo classified this as a fatality.

On December 21, 1990, the municipalities of Knin, Benkovac, Vojnić, Obrovac, Gračac, Dvor and Kostajnica adopted the "Statute of the Serbian Autonomous Region of Krajina".

Over two hundred armed incidents involving the rebel Serbs and Croatian police were reported between August 1990 and April 1991.

== Aftermath ==
The Serb National Council on March 16, 1991 declared Krajina to be independent of Croatia. On May 12, 1991 a referendum was held with over 99 percent of the vote supporting unification with Serbia. On 1 April 1991, it declared that it would secede from Croatia.

Afterwards the Krajina assembly declared that "the territory of the SAO Krajina is a constitutive part of the unified territory of the Republic of Serbia". The open hostilities of the Croatian War of Independence began in April 1991.

As a part of his plea bargain with the prosecution, in 2006 Milan Babić testified against Martić during his ICTY trial, saying Martić "tricked him into agreeing to the Log Revolution". He also testified that the entire war in Croatia was "Martić's responsibility, orchestrated by Belgrade". They were both convicted for ethnic cleansing of Croats and other non-Serbs from Krajina.

== See also ==
- Breakup of Yugoslavia
- Špegelj Tapes

== Sources ==
- Kreš, Marija, ed. (September 2010). "Prilog "Policija u Domovinskom ratu 1990. - 1991."" (PDF). Glasilo "Mir, Ugled, Povjerenje" (in Croatian) (42). Ministry of Internal Affairs of the Republic of Croatia. ISSN 1846-3444. Archived from the original (PDF) on 2017-07-03.
