= 1993–94 Republic of Serbian Krajina general election =

Elections in Croatia

- Presidential election
- 12 December 1993 (first round); 23 January 1994 (second round)
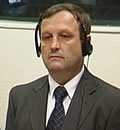

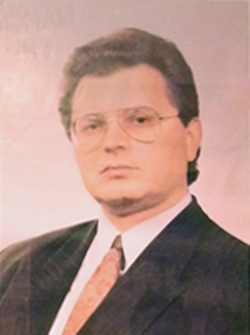
Candidate	Milan Martić	Milan Babić
Party	SPS	SDS
Popular vote	104,234	97,377
Percentage	51.70%	48.30%
President before election
Goran Hadžić
SDS
Elected President
Milan Martić
SPS

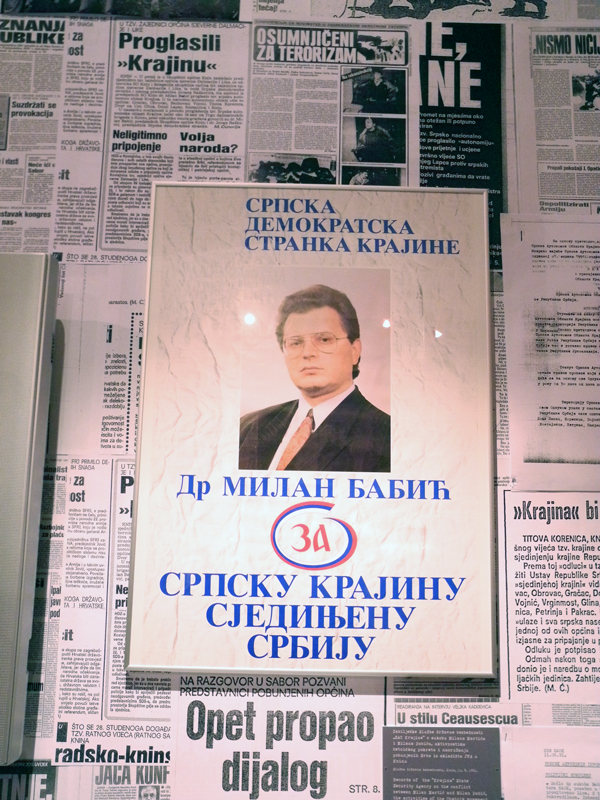
A flyer advertising Milan Babić's campaign during the election

Presidential and parliamentary elections were held in the unrecognized Republic of Serbian Krajina on 12 December 1993, with a second round of the presidential election on 23 January 1994. Milan Martić of the Serb Party of Socialists (SPS) was elected president in the second round, defeating former president Milan Babić, while the Serb Democratic Party (SDS) won a plurality of the seats in parliament. Then Serbian president Slobodan Milošević supported Martić's campaign and opposed Babić's.

== Campaign ==
Milošević had previously been in conflict with Babić over a UN-proposed ceasefire to end the Croatian War of Independence. Martić meanwhile supported Milošević's leadership in Serbia and in turn Milošević favoured Martić's victory in the presidential election. Martić ran for the Serb Party of Socialists, which received significant financial support from Milošević's Socialist Party of Serbia. On 21 January 1994, Martić stated that he would "speed up the process of unification [with Serbia]" and "pass on the baton to our all-Serbian leader Slobodan Milošević."

== Results ==
=== Presidential election ===
Rade Leskovac of the Serbian Radical Party came third in the first round of the presidential election and was eliminated. Martić came second in the first round with 54,000 fewer votes than Babić, but he went on to narrowly win the second round with 104,234 votes – 6,857 more than Babić.

Candidate	Party	First round		Second round	
Candidate	Party	Votes	%	Votes	%
Milan Babić	Serb Democratic Party	114,767	49.3	97,377	48.30
Milan Martić	Serb Party of Socialists	60,386	25.9	104,234	51.70
Rade Leskovac	Serbian Radical Party	26,523	11.4		
Four other candidates					
Total				201,611	100.00
Valid votes				201,611	97.17
Invalid/blank votes				5,864	2.83
Total votes				207,475	100.00
Source: United Press International

=== Parliamentary election ===
The SDS won 33 of the 85 seats in parliament; the result surprised many domestic observers, as the SPS had dominated the political scene in Serbian Krajina thanks to the efforts of Milošević. Martić formally challenged the results in a few constituencies, but they were ultimately dismissed.

Party	Seats
Serb Democratic Party	33
Serbian Democratic Party of the Serbian Lands	17
Serbian Radical Party	16
Civic Union	8
Serb Party of Socialists	6
Social Democratic Party	5
Total	85
Source: Gulić
