= Dušan Zelenbaba =

Serbian doctor, politician (born 1952)

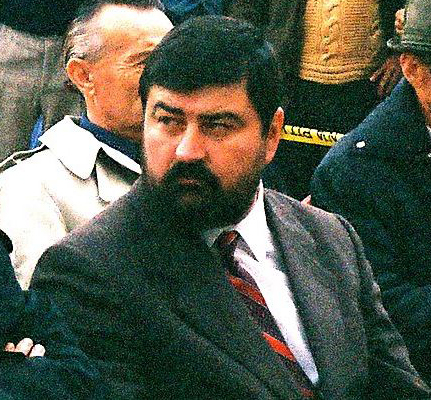
- Zelenbaba in Srb, 1990

Personal details
- Born: 1952 (age 73–74) Knin, PR Croatia, FPR Yugoslavia
- Occupation: Radiologist

Dušan Zelenbaba (Serbian Cyrillic: Душан Зеленбаба; born 1952) is a Serb physician and politician who was active prior to the Croatian War of Independence as a member of the Executive Committee of the Serb Democratic Party in Croatia.

== Biography ==
Zelenbaba graduated from the University of Rijeka Faculty of Medicine where he specialized in diagnostic radiology.

Prior to the beginning of the war in Croatia, he was a high-ranking politician in the Serbian Autonomous Region of Krajina, a radiologist in the Knin hospital, vice-president of the Serb Democratic Party's Knin section and a member of the Serb National Council. Zelenbaba was member of the Serb National Council from July 25, 1990 to December 19, 1990 when the Council was dissolved upon the election of Krajina's first cabinet. Zelenbaba was also one of the first Serb members of the Croatian Parliament while it was still the Socialist Republic of Croatia.

Afterwards, he left the Serb Democratic Party to join the Serbian Renewal Movement led by Vuk Drašković. Shortly thereafter he returned to the Serb Democratic Party. With his god-brother Jovan Opačić, professor Petar Štikovac and others, he formed the SDS section for the region of Bosnian Krajina. In 1992, Zelenbaba resigned from his post in the Knin hospital and moved to Novi Sad.

Today, he lives in Canada.

== Documentary ==
He made a short appearance in the 1995 BBC television documentary series The Death of Yugoslavia.
