= Serb Party of Socialists =

Serb Party of Socialists Српска партија социјалиста Srpska partija socijalista
- Abbreviation: SPS
- President: Milan Martić
- Founded: 1991
- Dissolved: 1995
- Headquarters: Knin, Croatia
- Ideology: Democratic socialism Left-wing nationalism Post-communism
- Political position: Centre-left to left-wing
- Colors: Red
- Serbian Krajina National Assembly: 6 / 85

The Serb Party of Socialists (Serbian: Српска партија социјалиста, romanized: Srpska partija socijalista, abbr. SPS) was the branch in Croatia of Serbian president Slobodan Milošević's Socialist Party of Serbia which was created in the areas under the control of the rebel state Republic of Serbian Krajina, controlled by Croatian Serbs.

== History ==
The party was established in 1991, the same year the Republic of Serbian Krajina was proclaimed, along with its constitution. During the 1993–94 election, Milan Martić ran for president of Serbian Krajina and received heavy financial support from the Milošević government. On 21 January, Martić stated that he would “speed up the process of unification” and “pass on the baton to our all Serbian leader Slobodan Milošević." After losing to Milan Babić in the first round, he was elected president in the second round of voting, and remained in power until the fall of RSK government during the Croatian Operation Storm in 1995.

== Electoral result ==
=== Presidential elections ===
President of the Republic of Serbian Krajina
Election year	Candidate	1st Round		2nd Round		Results
Election year	Candidate	# Votes	% Votes	# Votes	% Votes	Results
1993–1994	Milan Martić	60,386	25.9%	104,234	51.70%	Won ✓

=== Parliament of the Republic of Serbian Krajina ===
Party	Seats
Serb Democratic Party	33
Serbian Democratic Party of the Serbian Lands	17
Serbian Radical Party	16
Civic Union	8
Serb Party of Socialists	6
Social Democratic Party	5
Total	85
Source: Gulić
