= Party of Danube Serbs =

Party of Danube Serbs Партија подунавских Срба Partija podunavskih Srba
- Abbreviation: PPS
- Leader: Rade Leskovac
- Founded: 27 February 1998
- Dissolved: 2012–15
- Preceded by: Serbian Radical Party in the Republic of Serbian Krajina
- Headquarters: Vukovar
- Ideology: Serbian nationalism Regionalism; Anti-communism
- Political position: Right-wing
- Colours: Blue
- Croatian Parliament: 0 / 151

Party flag

The Party of Danube Serbs (Serbian: Партија подунавских Срба, romanized: Partija podunavskih Srba, abbr. PPS) was a Croatian Serb minority political party in Croatia.

== History ==
It was formed as the Serbian Radical Party in the Republic of Serbian Krajina by Rade Leskovac on 13 May 1992. Following the switching of power to Croatia over the previous SAO Eastern Slavonia, Baranja and Western Syrmia, the party was re-registered under its current name, with Leskovac remaining in the role of party leader. The party no longer supports the Greater Serbia concept.

On 4 February 1995, SRS RSK president, Rade Leskovac, was removed as the president by the Executive Board of the Serbian Radical Party in the Republic of Srpska Krajina and was also removed from the Serbian Radical Party for attempting to separate sections within it. Branko Vojnica was made the new president.

Leskovac caused a controversy in 2007 when election posters featured him giving a Serbian three-fingered salute were posted around the city of Vukovar, which is considered an aggressive Serbian nationalist symbol by many ethnic Croats. The Party was erased from Register of political parties sometime between 2012 and 2015.

== See also ==
- Serbian Radical Party in the Republic of Serbian Krajina
