= Borislav Mikelić =

- Борислав Микелић

4th Prime Minister of Republic of Serbian Krajina
- In office 27 March 1994 – 27 July 1995
- Preceded by: Đorđe Bjegović
- Succeeded by: Milan Babić

Personal details
- Born: 14 September 1939 Dobrljin, PR Bosnia and Herzegovina, FPR Yugoslavia (modern Bosnia and Herzegovina)
- Died: 12 April 2018 (aged 78) Belgrade, Serbia

Borislav Mikelić (Serbian Cyrillic: Борислав Микелић; 13 September 1939 – 12 May 2018) was a Serbian businessman and politician. He was of Croatian Serb background.

== Early life ==
A Serb born in Dobrljin, a village near Kostajnica, Bosnia and Herzegovina, at the time part of the Kingdom of Yugoslavia. Numerous members of Mikelić's family, including his parents, were killed in the Second World War by the Ustaše either in mass killings or at the Jasenovac concentration camp. After the war, Mikelić grew up in orphanages in Slovenia and Croatia.

He came to reside in the municipality of Petrinja in the Croatian region of Banovina, where he soon rose in the political structure. In the 1970's he served as mayor of Petrinja, and was an important figure there for the rest of the Socialist period. He set up the Gavrilović company, a meat processing farm which proved to be successful.

In the 1980's he rose to the Central Committee of the League of Communists of Croatia (SKH), and in April 1989 was elected to the Central Committee of the League of Communists of Yugoslavia (SKJ).

== Breakup of Yugoslavia ==
With the rise of nationalism and end of Communism in Yugoslavia in 1989–90, Mikelić found himself in a republic, Croatia, caught between two rival nationalisms – Croatian and Serbian. Mikelić opposed both, and, in August 1990 he and a number of other Serbs, Croats and others in the SKH formed the Yugoslavist Socialist Party of Croatia – Party of Yugoslav Orientation.

The party essentially supported the status quo ante bellum, i.e. preservation of federal Yugoslavia and Croatia as a federal republic of that federation, with the Serbs as a constituent nation, opposing both demands for confederalisation and Croatian independence and autonomy for the Serbs or the redrawing of any state borders.

In late September 1990, when Croatian police were sent to investigate Serb forces being organized in Petrinja, the Serb forces attacked the Croatian police force without warning. Mikelić, whose party was the first to inform the Federal Presidency of these dramatic events, was accused of organising a Serbian rebellion by the Croatian government. A court in Sisak sentenced him in absentia to 20 years in prison in 1993. After 11 years, he requested a review of the proceedings, and the Zagreb County Court dismissed the indictment in 2011.

The Socialist Party in January 1991 joined the League of Communists – Movement for Yugoslavia, but its influence in Croatia was not great. The HDZ also asked him to quit his job running Gavrilović, threatening to blockade the company if he did not resign.

Mikelić spent the next few years in Serbia, continuing his business activities and associated with the Yugoslav Left.

== Krajina Prime Minister ==
Mikelić returned to prominence in the political scene in 1994, when he was elected Prime Minister of the Serbian Republic of Krajina. As Prime Minister, Mikelić promoted economic, monetary and judicial ties with the Republic of Serbia (Belgrade), supported the idea of unification with Republika Srpska (the "United Serb Republic"), and was leading Krajina towards eventual unification with Serbia and Montenegro, with Belgrade's backing. This was undermined, however, in early 1995 when the Z-4 Plan was presented before the economic integration had got going, and Croatia decided not to renew the UNPROFOR mandate. Milan Martić, President of RSK, and Milan Babić, RSK Foreign Minister, declared that they would not consider Z-4 until the mandate was renewed. Mikelić regarded them as committing a major error in appearing to be obstinate, though he himself accepted Z-4 only as a basis for negotiation, as it offered autonomy only to 11 municipalities, which formed less than half of the RSK's territory. Mikelić was dismissed in June 1995.

=== Post-war ===
Mikelić was arrested by Serbian police for allegedly being involved in the assassination of Serbian Prime Minister Zoran Đinđić in March 2003. He spent three months in custody before being released by a decision of the Supreme Court.

== Death ==
Mikelić died on 12 May 2018 at the age of 79 in Belgrade, Serbia.
