= Serb People's Party =

Serb(ian) People's Party, Serb(ian) Popular Party, Serb(ian) National Party is a translation of Srpska narodna stranka and the name of a number of political parties:

- Serbian People's Party (2014) led by Nenad Popović
- Serb People's Party (Croatia) in Croatia
- Serb People's Party (Dalmatia) in the former Kingdom of Dalmatia
- Serb People's Party (Kosovo) in Kosovo, a disputed province of Serbia
- Serb People's Party (Montenegro) in Montenegro
