= Serb Democratic Party (Croatia) =

Serb Democratic Party Српска демократска странка Srpska demokratska stranka
- Abbreviation: SDS
- Founder: Jovan Rašković
- Founded: 17 February 1990
- Dissolved: 4 August 1995
- Headquarters: Knin
- Ideology: Serbian nationalism National conservatism Separatism
- Political position: Right-wing to far-right
- Regional affiliation: Serb Democratic Party (Bosnia and Herzegovina) and Serb Democratic Party (Serbia)
- Colours: Blue
- Ethnic group: Serbs of Croatia
- Croatian Parliament (1990): 5 / 356
- Serbian Krajina National Assembly: 33 / 85

Party flag

The Serb Democratic Party (Serbian: Српска демократска странка, romanized: Srpska demokratska stranka, abbr. СДС/SDS) was a political party in Croatia whose primary constituency was representing the Serbs of Croatia. It led the Republic of Serbian Krajina between its foundation in 1990 until its collapse in 1995.

== History ==
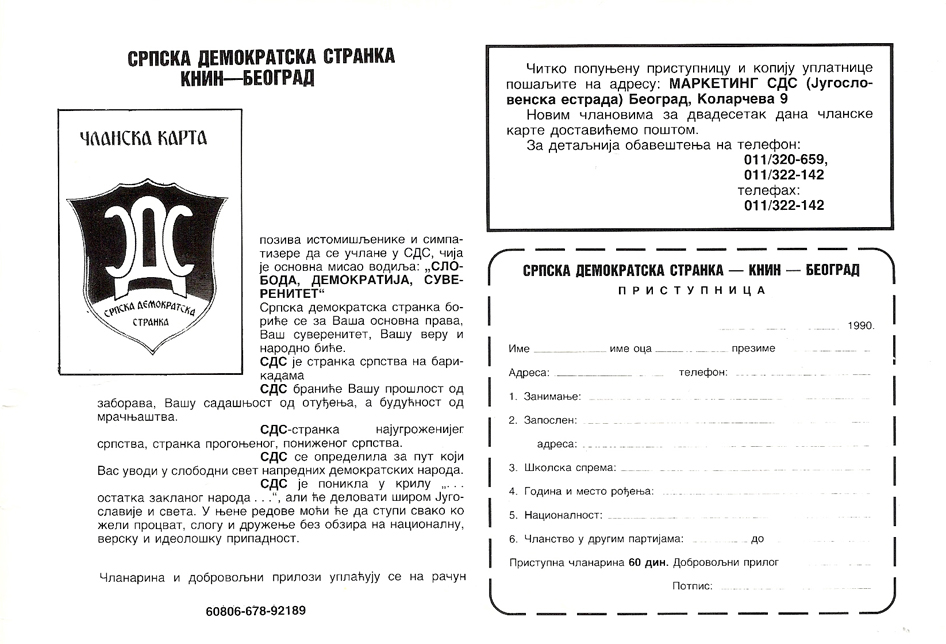
An old flyer advertising the SDS

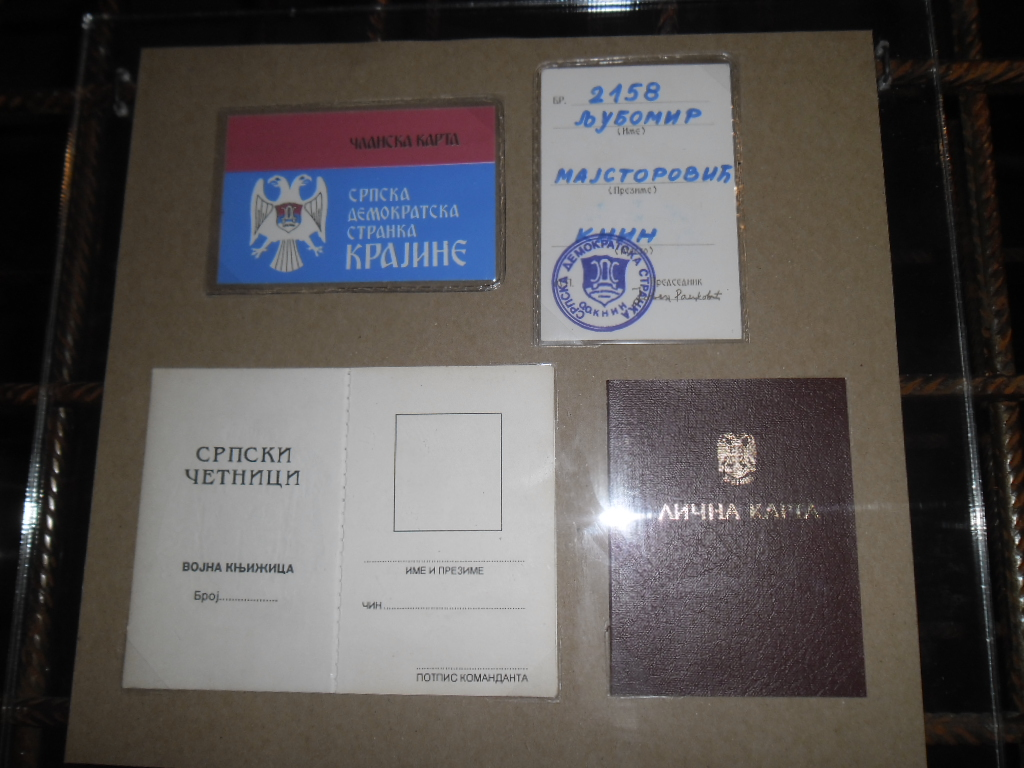
Republic of Serbian Krajina and SDS documents

The SDS was founded in the Socialist Republic of Croatia on February 17, 1990. It was organized by Jovan Rašković in 1990, with the wake of incoming democratic parliamentarism and rebirth of nationalism across Yugoslavia. The Croatian Democratic Union desired to gather the Croats, while SDS' aim were the Croatian Serbs. A sister party was founded in the neighbouring Bosnia and Herzegovina which took over the same lead, while the minor sister-parties in Serbia and Montenegro, where socialism was still strong, never became prominent.

SDS participated in the first democratic elections in Croatia in April and May 1990, winning 1.55% of the vote in the first, and 2% in the second round, giving them several seats in the Croatian Parliament where they were in the opposition. At the time, Franjo Tuđman considered the SDS as the primary representative of the Serbs in Croatia. They were the largest explicitly nationally inclined Serb party in Croatia, although their election success hardly matched the percentage of Serb population in Croatia, at the time 12.2% of the total population.

The self-professed main goal of SDS was to protect the Serb population, which it reckoned endangered as per the new Croatian Constitution that revoked the status of its Serbs from a constituent nation to a national minority. On July 6, 1990, Milan Babić convened a meeting of representatives of Serb-populated municipalities, where they rejected the constitutional changes which would preclude such municipal associations, introduce exclusively Croat symbols, and change the name of the language spoken in Croatia (from hrvatskosrpski Serbo-Croatian to hrvatski or Croatian). SDS also countered HDZ's desire of an independent Croatia, wishing instead to remain a part of Yugoslavia.

In the early 1990s its popularity grew along with reports of harsh discrimination of the Serb populace in Croatia by the regime of Tuđman. There were also reports of oppression of Serbs, as well as a media campaign directed by Belgrade that portrayed the Serbs of Croatia as being threatened by the Croat majority. This caused intense emigrations.

Later in 1990, the right wing and nationalist stream in the party won that considered that Serbs cannot live together with Croats in an independent Croatia and Rašković left Croatia along with his close supporters. Milan Babić took over party leadership and it became instrumental in the organization of events regarding the breakup of Yugoslavia on Croatian territory.

In July 1990, Babić and others organized and participated in a Serbian assembly in Srb, where they passed a Declaration "on the Sovereignty and Autonomy of the Serbian Nation" in Croatia and formed a Serbian National Council as the executive body of the assembly. The Council decided to hold a referendum on autonomy and sovereignty for Serbs in Croatia. It was held in late August, but the Croatian government declared it illegal, so it was held only in settlements with Serb majority, where the vote was 97.7% in favour. At the same time, Milan Martić started illegally distributing weapons to the Serb population and started to erect barricades in Knin which marked the beginning of the Log Revolution.

In December 1990, they formed SAO Krajina. In 1991, after the Plitvice Lakes incident, party founder Jovan Rašković left the SDS and politics all together, leaving Babić to be the new president of the party. In April 1991, the party decided to secede their territory from the Republic of Croatia, and convinced the Serb minority to boycott the 1991 Croatian independence referendum of May 19, 1991, considering it illegal. Instead, the SDS organized their own referendum a week earlier (May 12) on which they elected to stay in Yugoslavia. On 1 April 1991, it declared that it would secede from Croatia. Their referendum was in turn unrecognised by the Croatian government.

As the Croatian War of Independence escalated in 1991, the SDS took charge over the self-proclaimed breakaway Republic of Serbian Krajina formed on a little over 30% of Croatian territory under Serbian control. After Croatia seized most of Western Slavonia early in the war with Operation Otkos 10 and Operation Orkan 91, the territory controlled by the RSK, and by extension SDS, stabilized in January 1992. General elections were held in the RSK on 12 December 1993, with a second round of the presidential election on 23 January 1994. Martić ran for the Serb Party of Socialists which received significant financial support from Milošević's Socialist Party of Serbia unlike Babić's party. Martić received 54,000 fewer votes than Babić in the first round, but went on to win the second round with 104,234 votes.

The political party had to deal with increasing troubles, including economic bankruptcy, high unemployment rates and numerous refugees from the rest of Croatia. The arrival of international peacekeeping forces such as UNPROFOR and the subsequent United Nations protectorate greatly helped the situation, but occasional hit-and-run attacks by Croatian forces (Miljevci, Dubrovnik hinterland, Peruča, Maslenica, Medak, Dinara) greatly exhausted the entity. Inner-party divisions over the future of RSK further destabilized the political party.

When RSK was pushed out in Operation Storm in 1995, the party effectively ceased to exist. A number of its leadership was and is charged by the International Criminal Tribunal for the former Yugoslavia for crimes committed against Croats in the war, most notably its leader Milan Babić who pleaded guilty in 2004. In 2005, rump remains of party members founded a self-styled Republic of Serbian Krajina Government in Exile in Belgrade, Serbia. In 2006, party leader Milan Babić committed suicide in his cell by "using his own leather belt."

== List of presidents ==
No.	Name (Birth–Death)	Portrait	Term of office	
1	Jovan Rašković (1929–1992)		17 February 1990	December 1990
2	Milan Babić (1956–2006)		December 1990	7 August 1995

== Electoral result ==
=== Croatian Parliament ===
Year	Leader	Votes won	Percentage	Seats won	Seat change	Government
1990	Jovan Rašković	46,418	1.60%	5 / 356	New	Opposition

=== Presidential elections ===
President of the Republic of Serbian Krajina
Election year	Candidate	1st Round		2nd Round		Results
Election year	Candidate	# Votes	% Votes	# Votes	% Votes	Results
1993–1994	Milan Babić	114,767	49.3%	97,377	48.30%	Lost ✗

=== Parliament of the Republic of Serbian Krajina ===
Party	Seats
Serb Democratic Party	33
Serbian Democratic Party of the Serbian Lands	17
Serbian Radical Party	16
Civic Union	8
Serb Party of Socialists	6
Social Democratic Party	5
Total	85
Source: Gulić

== See also ==
- Serbs of Croatia
- Croatian War of Independence
- Serb Democratic Party (Bosnia and Herzegovina)
