= Milan Martić =

Croatian Serb politician and war criminal (born 1952)

- Милан Мартић
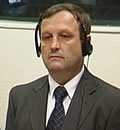
- Martić in 2009

3rd President of the Republic of Serbian Krajina
- In office 26 January 1994 – 7 August 1995
- Prime Minister: Borislav Mikelić; Milan Babić
- Preceded by: Milan Babić
- Succeeded by: Position abolished

1st Interior minister of the Republic of Serbian Krajina
- In office 19 December 1991 – 26 January 1994
- Preceded by: Position established
- Succeeded by: Ilija Prijić

Personal details
- Born: 18 November 1954 (age 72) Žagrović, Knin, SR Croatia, SFR Yugoslavia (modern Croatia)
- Party: Serb Party of Socialists
- Profession: Chief of police

Military service
- Allegiance: SFR Yugoslavia (Republic of Serbian Krajina) SAO Krajina; Serbian Krajina
- Branch/service: (Socialist Federal Republic of Yugoslavia) Public Security Station (Republic of Serbian Krajina) Krajina Militia; Army of the Republic of Serb Krajina; Liberation Army of Krajina
- Rank: Colonel General
- Battles/wars: Log Revolution; Croatian War of Independence; Plitvice Lakes incident; 1991 Yugoslav campaign in Croatia; Siege of Kijevo; Operation Storm; Bosnian war; Operation Corridor 92; NATO intervention in Bosnia and Herzegovina; Operation Deny Flight; Airstrike on Udbina Air Base

Milan Martić (Serbian Cyrillic: Милан Мартић; born 18 December 1954) is a Croatian Serb politician who served as the president of the unrecognized Republic of Serbian Krajina, a self-proclaimed state largely populated by Serbs of Croatia that wished to remain in Yugoslavia during the Croatian War of Independence.

After the war, Martić was indicted for war crimes by the International Criminal Tribunal for the former Yugoslavia (ICTY). He was convicted of war crimes on 12 June 2007 and sentenced to 35 years in prison. He is serving his sentence in Estonia since 2009.

== Biography ==
Martić was born on 18 November 1954 in the village of Žagrović, in the Knin municipality. He graduated from the Post-Secondary Police School in Zagreb and between 1976 and 1981 worked as a policeman at the Public Security Station (SJB) in Šibenik.

From 1982 onwards, Martić was a Junior Police Inspector in Knin and was eventually promoted to Chief of the SJB. He was the local police chief in Knin at the time of Croatia's declaration of independence. In 1990, he took on the position of local Serb leader, organizing the Milicija Krajina militia, also known as Martić's Police.

From 4 January 1991 to August 1995, Martić held various leadership positions, including President, Minister of Defence, Minister of Internal Affairs, in SAO Krajina and the Republic of Serbian Krajina (both unrecognised).

Also in 1991, Serbian opposition leader Vuk Drašković claimed Martić and Goran Hadžić had organized an assassination attempt on him. Martić replied that this was "an ordinary stupidity" and that "if he were to organize an assassination attempt, he would go through with it." Martić was critical of Drašković as Drašković called against mobilization and called for desertion.

Martić was supported by Slobodan Milošević during the presidential election in Serbian Krajina. Martić ran for the Serb Party of Socialists which received significant financial support from Milošević's Socialist Party of Serbia. On 21 January, Martić stated that he would “speed up the process of unification” and “pass on the baton to our all Serbian leader Slobodan Milošević.

In a second round of voting in 1994 he was elected president and remained in power until the fall of Serbian Krajina during Croatia's Operation Storm in 1995. After the fall of the Republic of Serbian Krajina, Martić and a large portion of the Serbian Krajina army and civilians, escaped to Banja Luka. Initially, he was rumored to have been either killed or wounded. He did not issue any statement for a number of days.

Martić went on to announce a plan of guerrilla warfare that would "last until the final freedom of the Republic of Serbian Krajina". Martić said in a statement:

"After the tragedy that has happened to the Serbian people of Krajina, the situation is slowly consolidating. In Banja Luka, we've formed a crisis staff which is led by President of the Krajina Parliament Rajko Ležaić. The goal of the staff is taking care of the refugees. I have taken upon myself the task of consolidating the dismantled army and preparing it for battle. I expect that many of these soldiers – the ones who aren't cowards – will return and attempt to liberate their centuries-old homeland and give Tuđman the hit that he deserves."

— Milan Martić

=== ICTY prosecution ===
Initially indicted by the International Criminal Tribunal for the former Yugoslavia (ICTY) on 25 July 1995, Martić surrendered on 15 May 2002, and was transferred to the tribunal in The Hague the same day. He was charged with murder, persecution, inhumane treatment, forced displacement, plunder of public or private property, and wanton destruction of cities, towns or villages. He pleaded not guilty to all counts.

According to the ICTY, in the amended indictment, he "helped organize an ethnic cleansing campaign of Croats and other non-Serbs from Krajina and virtually the entire non-Serb population was forcibly removed, deported or killed". He was originally charged only with ordering rocket attacks on Zagreb which killed seven civilians and wounded 214 as retaliation to Operation Flash. Two days later, in an interview, Martić admitted he had personally ordered the shelling of the city.

Milan Babić, who, along with Martić, was one of the most important leaders of the rebel Croatian Serbs, stated in court during Martić's trial that the entire war in Croatia was Martić's responsibility, orchestrated by Serbian authorities under Milošević from Belgrade.

His trial started on 13 December 2005 and ended on 12 January 2007. On 12 June 2007, Martić was sentenced to 35 years in prison. His sentence of 35 years in prison was confirmed by ICTY appellate council on 8 October 2008. He was found to have been part of a "joint criminal enterprise" which included Blagoje Adžić, Milan Babić, Radmilo Bogdanović, Veljko Kadijević, Radovan Karadžić, Slobodan Milošević, Ratko Mladić, Vojislav Šešelj, Franko Simatović, Jovica Stanišić, and Dragan Vasiljković. In June 2009, he was transferred to Tartu prison in Estonia to serve out his sentence.
