= Republic of Serbian Krajina =

Quasi-state in Croatia (1991–1995)

Republic of Serbian Krajina Република Српска Крајина, Republika Srpska Krajina (Serbian)
- 1991–1995
- Flag Coat of arms
- Motto: Samo sloga Srbina spasava Само слога Србина спашава "Only Unity Saves the Serbs"
- Anthem: Bože Pravde; Боже правде "God of Justice" Unofficial anthem: Himna Krajini; Химна Крајини "Anthem to Krajina"
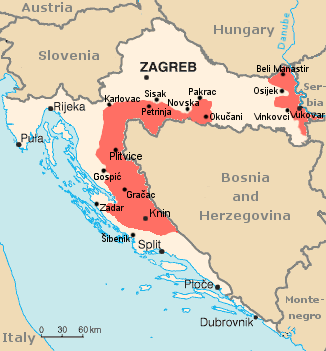
- The self-declared Republic of Serbian Krajina in 1991
- Status: Unrecognized client state of Yugoslavia/Serbia
- Capital: Knin
- Largest city: Vukovar
- Common languages: Serbian
- Religion: Serbian Orthodox
- Government: Semi-presidential republic
- President
  - 1991–1992: Milan Babić
  - 1992–1994: Goran Hadžić
  - 1994–1995: Milan Martić
- Prime Minister
  - 1991–1992 (first): Dušan Vještica
  - 1995 (last): Milan Babić
- Legislature: National Assembly
- Historical era: Yugoslav Wars
  - Log Revolution: 17 August 1990
  - Constitution adopted: 19 December 1991
  - Operation Flash: 3 May 1995
  - Operation Storm: 8 August 1995
  - Erdut Agreement: 12 November 1995

Area
- 1991: 17,028 km^{2} (6,575 sq mi)

Population
  - 1991: 286,716
  - 1993: 435,595
  - 1994: 430,000
- Currency: Krajina dinar (1992–1994); Yugoslav dinar (1994–1995)
Preceded by
Socialist Republic of Croatia
SAO Krajina
SAO Western Slavonia
SAO Eastern Slavonia, Baranja and Western Syrmia
Succeeded by
Croatia
Eastern Slavonia, Baranja and Western Syrmia (1995–1998)
- Today part of: Croatia
- Area source: Population source

The Republic of Serbian Krajina or Serb Republic of Krajina (Serbian: Република Српска Крајина / Republika Srpska Krajina, pronounced [rɛpǔblika sr̩̂pskaː krâjina]; abbr. РСК / RSK), also known as the Serbian Krajina (Српска Крајина / Srpska Krajina) or simply Krajina (Крајина), was an unrecognised geopolitical entity and a self-proclaimed Serb quasi-state, a territory within the newly independent Republic of Croatia (formerly part of Socialist Yugoslavia), which it defied, and which was active during the Croatian War of Independence (1991–95). It was not recognized internationally. The name Krajina ("Frontier") was adopted from the historical Military Frontier of the Habsburg monarchy and later the Austrian and Austro-Hungarian Empire, which had a substantial Serb population and existed up to the late 19th century. The RSK government waged a war for ethnic Serb independence from Croatia and unification with the Federal Republic of Yugoslavia and Republika Srpska (in Bosnia and Herzegovina).

The government of Krajina had de facto control over central parts of the territory while control of the outskirts changed with the successes and failures of its military activities. The territory was legally protected by the United Nations Protection Force (UNPROFOR). Its main portion was overrun by Croatian forces in 1995 and the Republic of Serbian Krajina was ultimately disbanded as a result. A rump remained in eastern Slavonia under UNTAES administration until its peaceful reintegration into Croatia in 1998 under the Erdut Agreement.

== Background ==
The name Krajina (meaning "frontier") stemmed from the Military Frontier which the Habsburg monarchy carved out of parts of the crown lands of Croatia and Slavonia between 1553 and 1578 with a view to defending itself against the expansion of the Ottoman Empire. The population was mainly Croats, Serbs and Vlachs who immigrated from nearby parts of the Ottoman Empire (Ottoman Bosnia and Serbia) into the region and helped bolster and replenish the population as well as the garrisoned troops in the fight against the Ottomans. The Austrians controlled the Frontier from military headquarters in Vienna and did not make it a crown land, though it had some special rights in order to encourage settlement in an otherwise deserted, war-ravaged territory. The abolition of the military rule took place between 1869 and 1871. In order to attract Serbs to become part of Croatia, on 11 May 1867, the Sabor solemnly declared that "the Triune Kingdom recognizes the Serbs living in it as a nation identical and equal with the Croatian nation". Subsequently, the Military Frontier was incorporated into Habsburg Croatia on 1 August 1881 when the Ban of Croatia Ladislav Pejačević took over from the Zagreb General Command.

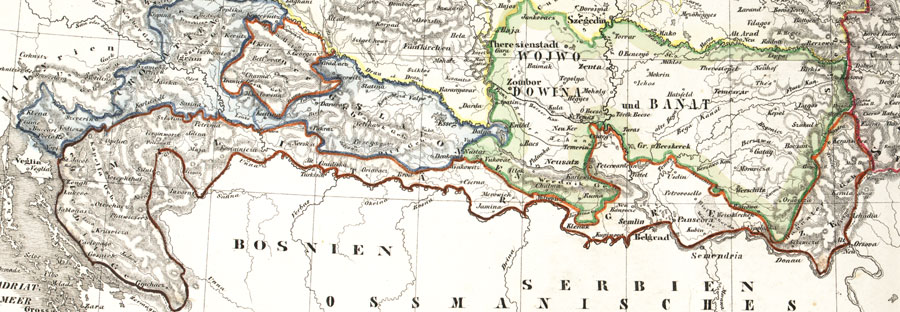
Map of original Krajina, the Military Frontier

Following the end of World War I in 1918, the regions formerly forming part of the Military Frontier came under the control of the Kingdom of Yugoslavia, where they formed part of the Sava Banovina, along with most of the old Croatia-Slavonia. Between the two World Wars, the Serbs of the Croatian and Slavonian Krajina, as well as those of the Bosnian Krajina and of other regions west of Serbia, organized a notable political party, the Independent Democratic Party under Svetozar Pribićević. In the new state there existed much tension between the Croats and Serbs over differing political visions, with the campaign for Croatian autonomy culminating in the assassination of a Croatian leader, Stjepan Radić, in the parliament, and repression by the Serb-dominated security structures.

Between 1939 and 1941, in an attempt to resolve the Croat-Serb political and social antagonism in first Yugoslavia, the Kingdom established an autonomous Banovina of Croatia incorporating (amongst other territories) much of the former Military Frontier as well as parts of Bosnia and Herzegovina. In 1941, the Axis powers invaded Yugoslavia and in the aftermath the Independent State of Croatia (which included the whole of today's Bosnia and Herzegovina and parts of Serbia (Eastern Syrmia) as well) was declared. The Germans installed the Ustaše (who had allegedly plotted the assassination of the Serbian King Alexander I of Yugoslavia in 1934) as rulers of the new country; the Ustaše authorities promptly pursued a genocidal policy of persecution of Serbs, Jews and Croats (from opposition groups), leading to the deaths of over 300,000. During this period, individual Croats coalesced around the ruling authorities or around the communist anti-fascist Partisans. Serbs from around the Knin area tended to join the Chetniks, whilst Serbs from the Banovina and Slavonia regions tended to join the Partisans. Various Chetnik groups also committed atrocities against Croats across many areas of Lika and parts of northern Dalmatia.

At the end of World War II in 1945, the communist-dominated Partisans prevailed and the Krajina region became part of the People's Republic of Croatia until 7 April 1963, when the federal republic changed its name to the Socialist Republic of Croatia. Josip Broz Tito suppressed the autonomous political organizations of the region (along with other movements such as the Croatian Spring); however, the Yugoslav constitutions of 1965 and 1974 did give substantial rights to national minorities - including to the Serbs in SR Croatia.

The Serbian "Krajina" entity to emerge upon Croatia's declaration of independence in 1991 would include three kinds of territories:

- a large section of the historical Military Frontier, in areas with a majority Serbian population;
- areas such as parts of northern Dalmatia, that never formed part of the Frontier but had a majority or a plurality of Serbian population, including the self-proclaimed entity's capital, Knin;
- areas that bordered with Serbia and where Serbs formed a significant minority (Baranya, Vukovar).

Large sections of the historical Military Frontier lay outside of the Republic of Serbian Krajina and contained a largely Croat population - these including much of Lika, the area centered around the city of Bjelovar, central and south-eastern Slavonia.

== Creation ==
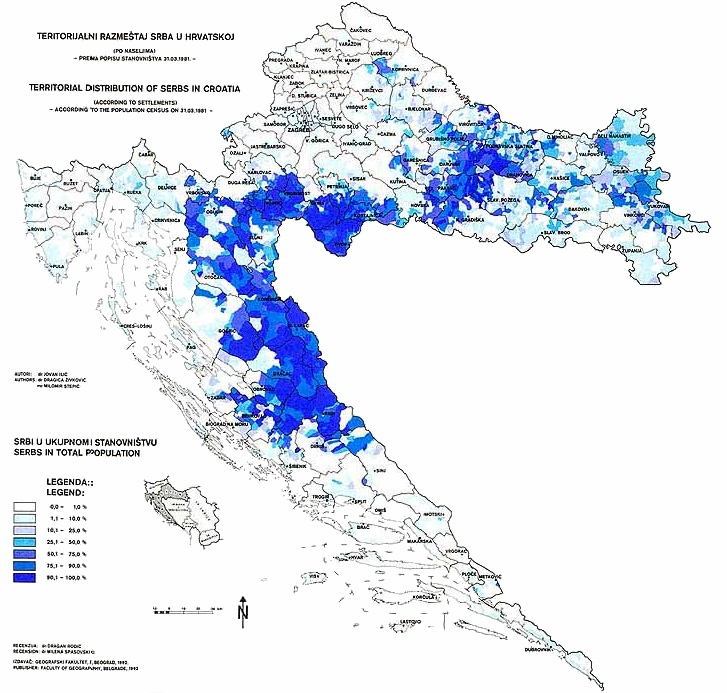
Serb-populated areas in Croatia (according to the 1981 census)

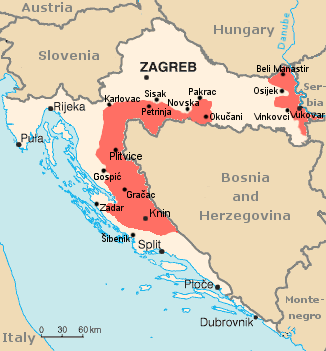
Map of Serbian Krajina.

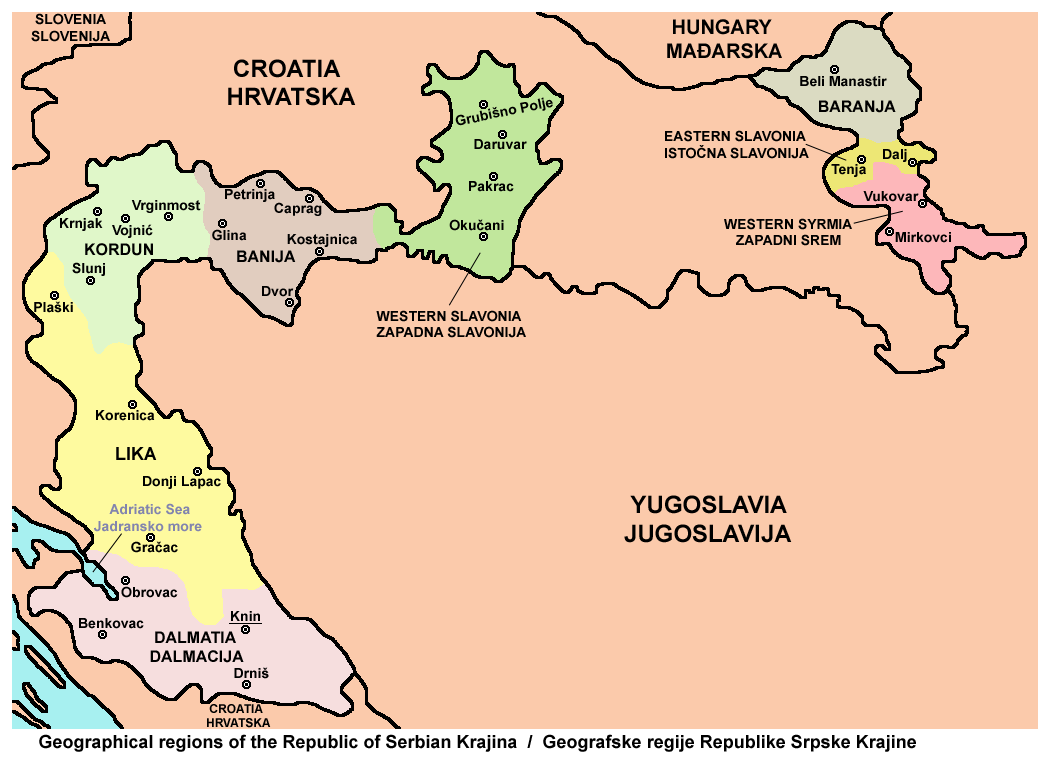
Geographical regions, including main cities and towns, of Serbian Krajina.

The Serb-populated regions in Croatia were of central concern to the Serbian nationalist movement of the late 1980s, led by Slobodan Milošević. In September 1986 the Serbian Academy's memorandum on the status of Serbia and Serbs was partially leaked by a Serbian newspaper. It listed a series of grievances against the Yugoslav federation, claiming that the situation in Kosovo was genocide, and complained about alleged discrimination of Serbs at the hands of the Croatian authorities. Among the claims that it makes is that 'except for the time under the Independent State of Croatia, the Serbs in Croatia have never been as jeopardized as they are today'. Tension was further fueled by the overthrow of Vojvodina and Montenegro's government by Milošević's loyalists, and the abrogation of Kosovo's and Vojvodina's autonomy in 1989, which gave Milošević 4 out of 8 votes on the Yugoslav Federal Presidency, thus gaining the power to block every decision made by the Presidency. Furthermore, a series of Serb nationalist rallies were held in Croatia during 1989, under pressure from Serbia. On 8 July 1989, a large nationalist rally was held in Knin, during which banners threatening JNA intervention in Croatia, as well as Chetnik iconography was displayed. The Croatian pro-independence party victory in 1990 made matters more tense, especially since the country's Serb minority was supported by Milošević. At the time, Serbs comprised about 12.2% (581,663 people) of Croatia's population (1991 census). In 1990 a group of senior Serb officers of the Yugoslav People's Army (JNA) and experts from the JNA's Psychological Operations Department developed the RAM Plan. Its purpose was organizing Serbs outside Serbia, consolidating control of the Serbian Democratic Parties (SDS), and preparing arms and ammunition in an effort of establishing a country where "all Serbs with their territories would live together in the same state."

Serbs became increasingly opposed to the policies of Franjo Tuđman, elected president of Croatia in April 1990, due to his overt desire for the creation of an independent Croatia. On 30 May 1990, the Serb Democratic Party (SDS) of Jovan Rašković broke all ties to the Croatian parliament. The following June in Knin, the SDS-led Serbs proclaimed the creation of the Association of Municipalities of Northern Dalmatia and Lika. In August 1990, the Serbs began what became known as the Log Revolution, where barricades of logs were placed across roads throughout the South as an expression of their secession from Croatia. This effectively cut Croatia in two, separating the coastal region of Dalmatia from the rest of the country. The Constitution of Croatia was passed in December 1990, which reduced the status of Serbs from "constituent" to a "national minority" in the same category as other groups such as Italians and Hungarians. Some would later justify their claim to an independent Serb state by arguing that the new constitution contradicted the 1974 Yugoslav Constitution, because, in their view, Croatia was still legally governed by the Socialist Federal Republic of Yugoslavia, although this ignores the fact that Serbia's constitution, promulgated three months before Croatia's, also contained several provisions violating the 1974 Federal Constitution.

Serbs in Croatia had established a Serbian National Council in July 1990 to coordinate opposition to Croatian independence. Their position was that if Croatia could secede from Yugoslavia, then the Serbs could secede from Croatia. Milan Babić, a dentist by profession from the southern town of Knin, was elected president. At his ICTY trial in 2004, he claimed that "during the events [of 1990–1992], and in particular at the beginning of his political career, he was strongly influenced and misled by Serbian propaganda, which repeatedly referred to the imminent threat of a Croatian genocide perpetrated on the Serbs in Croatia, thus creating an atmosphere of hatred and fear of Croats." The rebel Croatian Serbs established a number of paramilitary militia units under the leadership of Milan Martić, the police chief in Knin.

In August 1990, a referendum was held in Krajina on the question of Serb "sovereignty and autonomy" in Croatia. The resolution was confined exclusively to Serbs so it passed by an improbable majority of 99.7%. As expected, it was declared illegal and invalid by the Croatian government, who stated that Serbs had no constitutional right to break away from Croatian legal territory - as well as no right to limit the franchise to one ethnic group.

Babić's administration announced the creation of a Serbian Autonomous Oblast of Krajina (or SAO Krajina) on 21 December 1990. On 16 March 1991, another referendum was held which asked: "Are you in favor of the SAO Krajina joining the Republic of Serbia and staying in Yugoslavia with Serbia, Montenegro and others who wish to preserve Yugoslavia?". With 99.8% voting in favor, the referendum was approved and the Krajina assembly declared that "the territory of the SAO Krajina is a constitutive part of the unified state territory of the Republic of Serbia". On 1 April 1991, it declared that it would secede from Croatia. Other Serb-dominated communities in eastern Croatia announced that they would also join SAO Krajina and ceased paying taxes to the Zagreb government, and began implementing its own currency system, army regiments, and postal service.

Croatia held a referendum on independence on 19 May 1991, in which the electorate—minus many Serbs, who chose to boycott it—voted overwhelmingly for independence with the option of confederate union with other Yugoslav states - with 83 percent turnout, voters approved the referendum by 93 percent. On 25 June 1991, Croatia and Slovenia both declared their independence from Yugoslavia. As the JNA attempted unsuccessfully to suppress Slovenia's independence in the short Ten-Day War, clashes between revolting Croatian Serbs and Croatian security forces broke out almost immediately, leaving dozens dead on both sides. Serbs were supported by remnants of the JNA (whose members were now only from Serbia and Montenegro), which provided them weapons. Many Croatians fled their homes in fear or were forced out by the rebel Serbs. The European Union and United Nations unsuccessfully attempted to broker ceasefires and peace settlements.

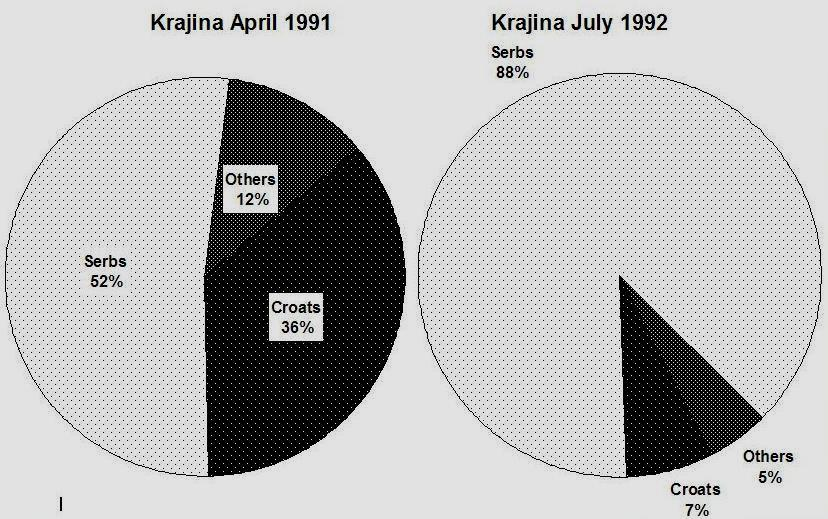
Change in the ethnic composition of Krajina from April 1991 to July 1992. Serbs increased from 52.3% to 88% of the total population

Around August 1991, the leaders of Serbian Krajina and Serbia allegedly agreed to embark on a campaign which the ICTY prosecutors described as a "joint criminal enterprise" whose purpose "was the forcible removal of the majority of the Croat and other non-Serb population from approximately one-third of the territory of the Republic of Croatia, an area he planned to become part of a new Serb-dominated state." According to testimony given by Milan Babić in his subsequent war crimes trial, during the summer of 1991, the Serbian secret police (under Milošević's command) set up "a parallel structure of state security and the police of Krajina and units commanded by the state security of Serbia". Paramilitary groups such as the Wolves of Vučjak and White Eagles, funded by the Serbian secret police, were also a key component of this structure.

A wider-scale war was launched in August 1991. Over the following months, a large area of territory, amounting to a third of Croatia, was controlled by the rebel Serbs. The Croatian population suffered heavily, fleeing or evicted with numerous killings, leading to ethnic cleansing. The bulk of the fighting occurred between August and December 1991 when approximately 80,000 Croats were expelled (and some were killed). Many more died and/or were displaced in fighting in eastern Slavonia (this territory along the Croatian/Serbian border was not part of the Krajina, and it was the JNA that was the principal actor in that part of the conflict). The total number of exiled Croats and other non-Serbs range from 170,000 (ICTY) to up to a quarter of a million people (Human Rights Watch).

In the latter half of 1991, Croatia was beginning to form an army and their main defenders, the local police, were overpowered by the JNA military who supported rebelled Croatian Serbs. The RSK was located entirely inland, but they soon started advancing deeper into Croatian territory. Among other places, they shelled the Croatian coastal town of Zadar, killing over 80 people in nearby areas and damaging the Maslenica Bridge that connected northern and southern Croatia in Operation Coast-91. In the Battle of Šibenik, the JNA had tried to overtake Šibenik, but the defenders successfully repelled the attack. The main city theatre was also bombed by JNA forces. The city of Vukovar, however, was completely devastated by JNA attacks. After 87 days of warding off JNA attacks, the city of Vukovar eventually fell, ending the Battle of Vukovar. 2,000 Vukovar defenders and civilians were killed, 800 went missing, and 22,000 were forced into exile. The wounded were taken from the Vukovar Hospital to nearby Ovčara where they were executed.

== Formal proclamations ==
On 19 December 1991, the SAO Krajina and SAO Western Slavonia proclaimed themselves together as the Republic of Serbian Krajina. The Constitution of Serbian Krajina came into effect the same day. On 26 February 1992, the SAO Slavonia, Baranja and Western Syrmia was added to the RSK, which initially had only encompassed the territories within the SAO Krajina. The Serbian Army of Krajina (Srpska Vojska Krajine, SVK) was officially formed on 19 March 1992. The RSK occupied an area of some 17,028 km^{2} at its greatest extent.

== 1992 ceasefire ==
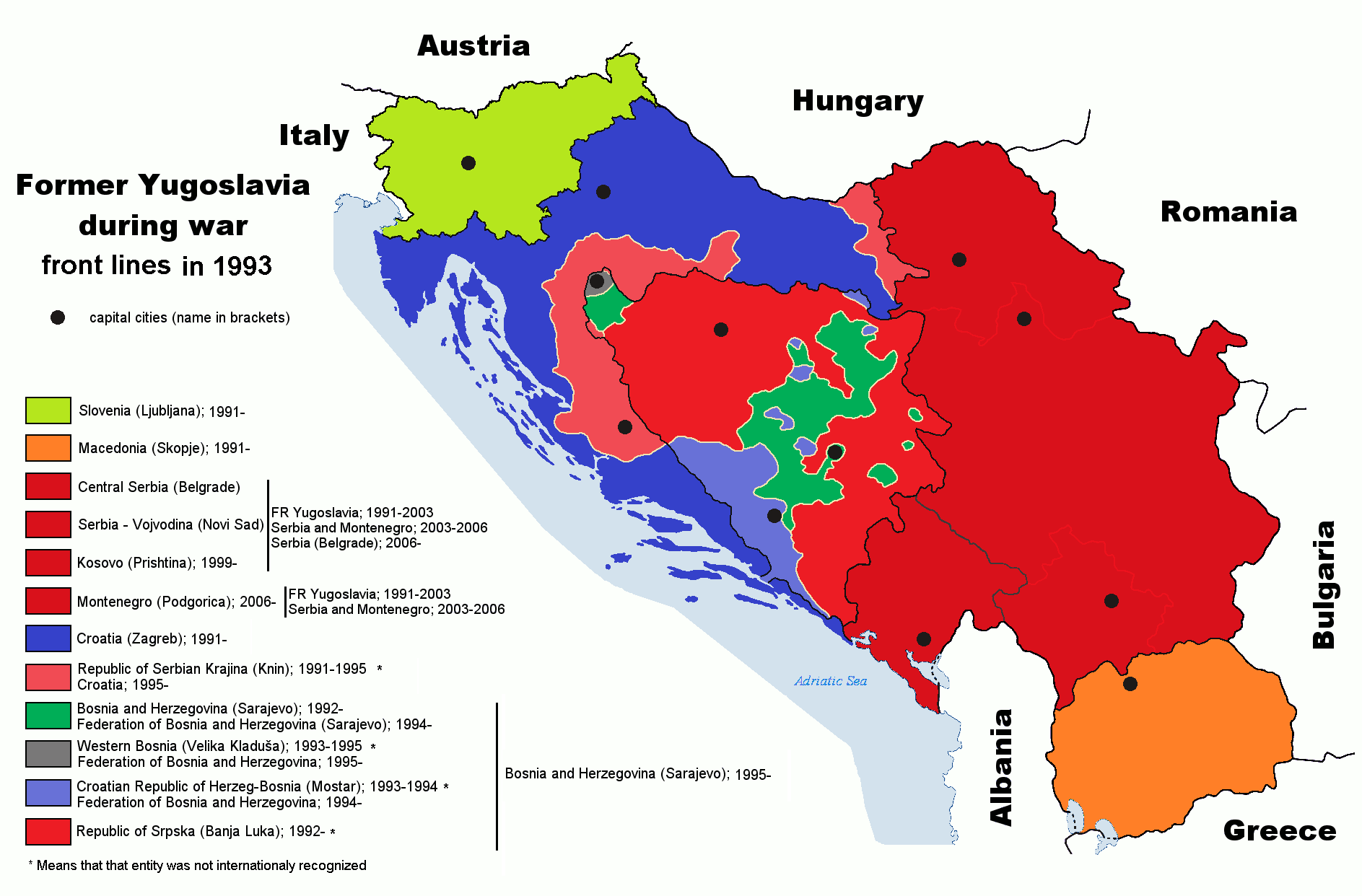
War in former Yugoslavia, 1993

Under the Vance plan, signed in November 1991, Presidents Tuđman and Milošević agreed to a United Nations peace plan put forward by Cyrus Vance. A final ceasefire agreement, the Sarajevo Agreement, was signed by representatives of the two sides in January 1992, paving the way for the implementation of the Vance plan. Four United Nations Protected Areas (UNPAs) were established in Croatian territory which was claimed by RSK, and the plan called for the withdrawal of the JNA from Croatia and for the return of refugees to their homes in the UNPAs.

The JNA officially withdrew from Croatia in May 1992 but much of its weaponry and many of its personnel remained in the Serb-held areas and were turned over to the RSK's security forces. Refugees were not allowed to return to their homes and many of the remaining Croats and other nationalities left in the RSK were expelled or killed in the following months. On 21 February 1992, the creation of the United Nations Protection Force (UNPROFOR) was authorised by the UN Security Council for an initial period of a year, to provide security to the UNPAs.

The agreement effectively froze the front lines for the next three years. Croatia and the RSK had effectively fought each other to a standstill. The Republic of Serbian Krajina was not recognized de jure by any other country or international organization.

== After the ceasefire ==
UNPROFOR was deployed throughout the region to maintain the ceasefire, although in practice its light armament and restricted rules of engagement meant that it was little more than an observer force. It proved wholly unable to ensure that refugees returned to the RSK. Indeed, the rebel Croatian Serb authorities continued to make efforts to ensure that they could never return, destroying villages and cultural and religious monuments to erase the previous existence of the Croatian inhabitants of the Krajina. Milan Babić later testified that this policy was driven from Belgrade through the Serbian secret police—and ultimately Milošević—who he claimed was in control of all the administrative institutions and armed forces in the Krajina. Milošević denied this, claiming that Babić had made it up "out of fear".

The Serbian Army of Krajina frequently attacked neighboring Bihać enclave (then in the Republic of Bosnia and Herzegovina) with heavy artillery.

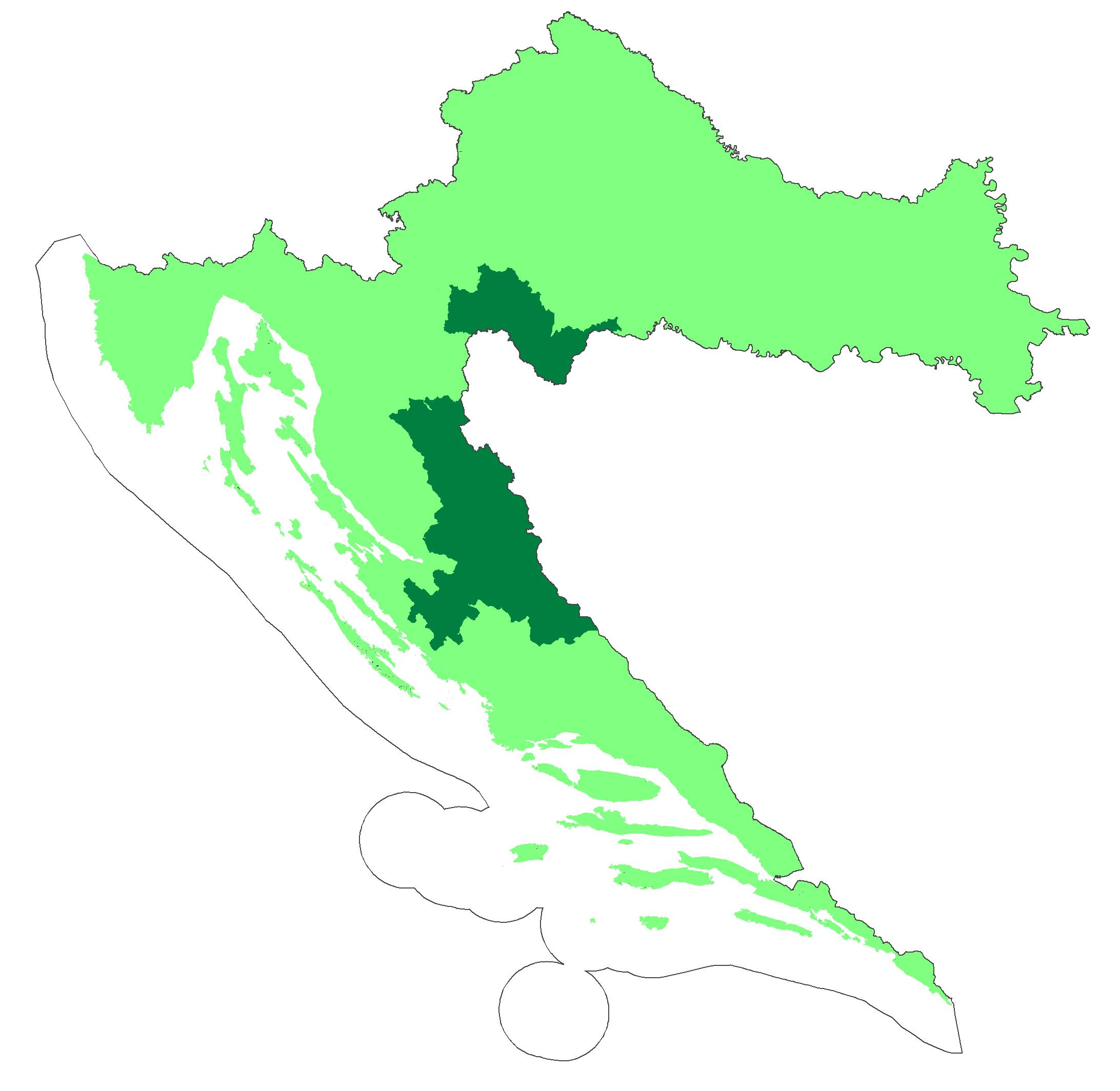
Two proposed autonomous districts of Croatia are shown in dark green.

With the creation of new Croatian counties on 30 December 1992, the Croatian government also set aside two autonomous regions (kotar) for ethnic Serbs in the areas of Krajina:

- Autonomous District of Glina (Croatian: Autonomni kotar Glina, Serbian Cyrillic: Аутономни котар Глина)
  - Municipalities de jure within the Autonomous District of Glina were Glina, Vrginmost, Hrvatska Kostajnica, Dvor and Vojnić.
- Autonomous District of Knin (Croatian: Autonomni kotar Knin, Serbian Cyrillic: Аутономни котар Книн)

However, Serbs considered this too late, as it was not the amount of autonomy they wanted, and by now they had declared de facto independence.

The districts never actually functioned since they were located within the self-proclaimed Republic of Serbian Krajina. The existence of the Autonomous District of Glina was also provided in the draft of the Z-4 plan, that was rejected. After Operation Storm, the application of the law which allowed autonomy would be temporarily suspended. In 2000 this part of the law was formally repealed.

== Decline ==
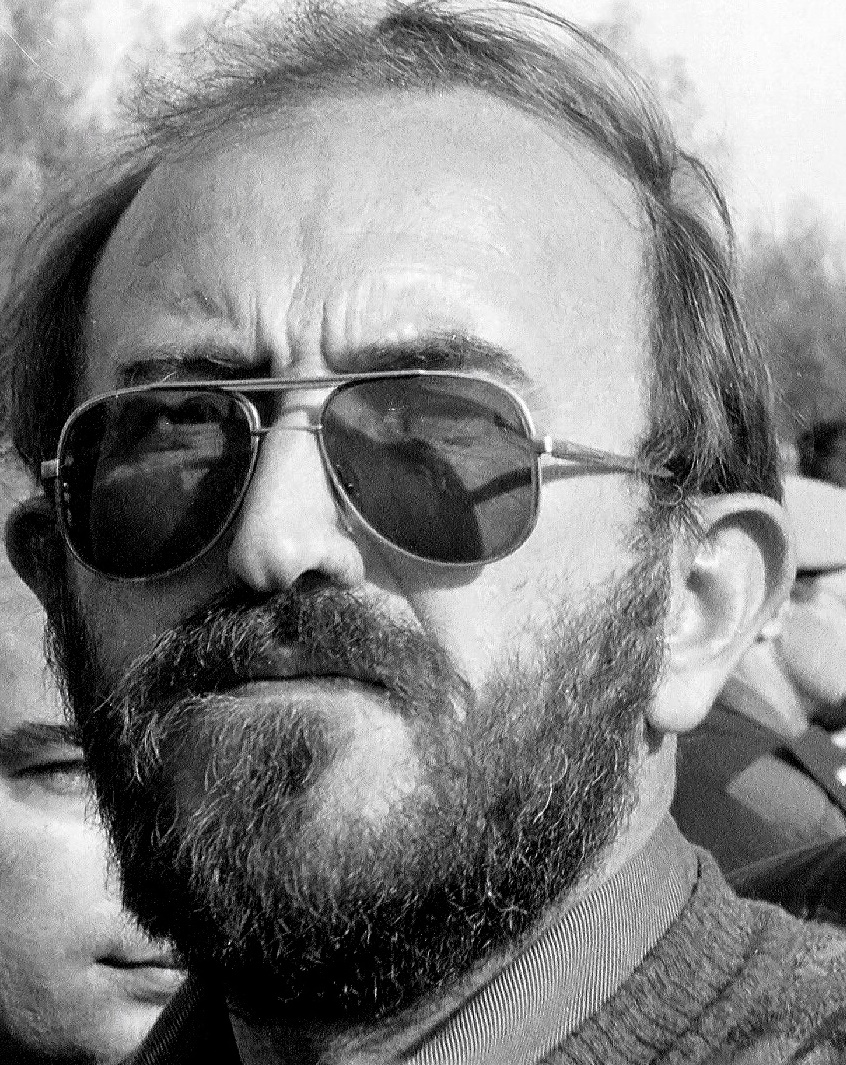
1992: RSK president Goran Hadžić.

The partial implementation of the Vance Plan drove a wedge between the governments of the RSK and Serbia, the RSK's principal backer and supplier of fuel, arms, and money. Milan Babić strongly opposed the Vance Plan but was overruled by the RSK's assembly.

On 26 February 1992, Babić was deposed and replaced as President of the RSK by Goran Hadžić, a Milošević loyalist. Babić remained involved in RSK politics but as a considerably weaker figure.

The position of the RSK eroded steadily over the following three years. On the surface, the RSK had all the trappings of a state: army, parliament, president, government and ministries, currency and stamps. However, its economy was wholly dependent on support from the rump Yugoslavia, which had the effect of importing that country's hyperinflation.

The economic situation soon became disastrous. By 1994, only 36,000 of the RSK's 430,000 citizens were employed. The war had severed the RSK's trade links with the rest of Croatia, leaving its few industries idle. With few natural resources of its own, it had to import most of the goods and fuel it required. Agriculture was devastated, and operated at little more than a subsistence level. Professionals went to Serbia or elsewhere to escape the republic's economic hardships. To make matters worse, the RSK's government was grossly corrupt and the region became a haven for black marketeering and other criminal activity. It was clear by the mid-1990s that without a peace deal or support from Yugoslavia the RSK was not economically viable. This was especially evident in Belgrade, where the RSK had become an unwanted economic and political burden for Milošević. Much to his frustration, the rebel Croatian Serbs rebuffed his government's demands to settle the conflict. In July 1992 the RSK issued its own currency, the Krajina dinar (HRKR), in parallel with the Yugoslav dinar. This was followed by the "October dinar" (HRKO), first issued on 1 October 1993 and equal to 1,000,000 Reformed Dinar, and the "1994 dinar", first issued on 1 January 1994, and equal to 1,000,000,000 October dinar. The RSK's weakness also adversely affected its armed forces, the Serbian Army of Krajina (SVK). Since the 1992 ceasefire agreement, Croatia had spent heavily on importing weapons and training its armed forces with assistance from American contractors. In contrast, the VSK had grown steadily weaker, with its soldiers poorly motivated, trained and equipped. There were only about 55,000 of them to cover a front of some 600 km in Croatia plus 100 km along the border with the Bihać pocket in Bosnia. With 16,000 stationed in eastern Slavonia, only about 39,000 were left to defend the main part of the RSK. Overall, only 30,000 were capable of full mobilization, yet they faced a far stronger Croatian army. Also, political divisions between Hadžić and Babić occasionally led to physical and sometimes even armed confrontations between their supporters; Babić himself was assaulted and beaten in an incident in Benkovac.

In January 1993 the revitalized Croatian army attacked the Serbian positions around Maslenica in southern Croatia which curtailed their access to the sea via Novigrad.

In mid-1993, the RSK authorities started a campaign to formally create a United Serbian Republic.

In a second offensive in mid-September 1993, the Croatian army overran the Medak pocket in southern Krajina in a push to regain Serb-held Croatian territory. The rebel Croatian Serbs brought reinforcements forward fairly quickly, but the strength of the Croatian forces proved superior. The Croatian offensive was halted by a combination of a battalion of Canadian peacekeepers from the second battalion of Princess Patricia's Canadian Light Infantry (PPCLI) reinforced by a Company of French peacekeepers, combined with international diplomacy. Hadžić sent an urgent request to Belgrade for reinforcements, arms, and equipment. In response, around 4,000 paramilitaries under the command of Vojislav Šešelj (the White Eagles) and "Arkan" (the Serb Volunteer Guard) arrived to bolster the VSK.

General elections were held in the RSK on 12 December 1993, with a second round of the presidential election on 23 January 1994. Martić received 54,000 fewer votes than Babić in the first round, but went on to win the second round with 104,234 votes.

== Operations Flash and Storm ==
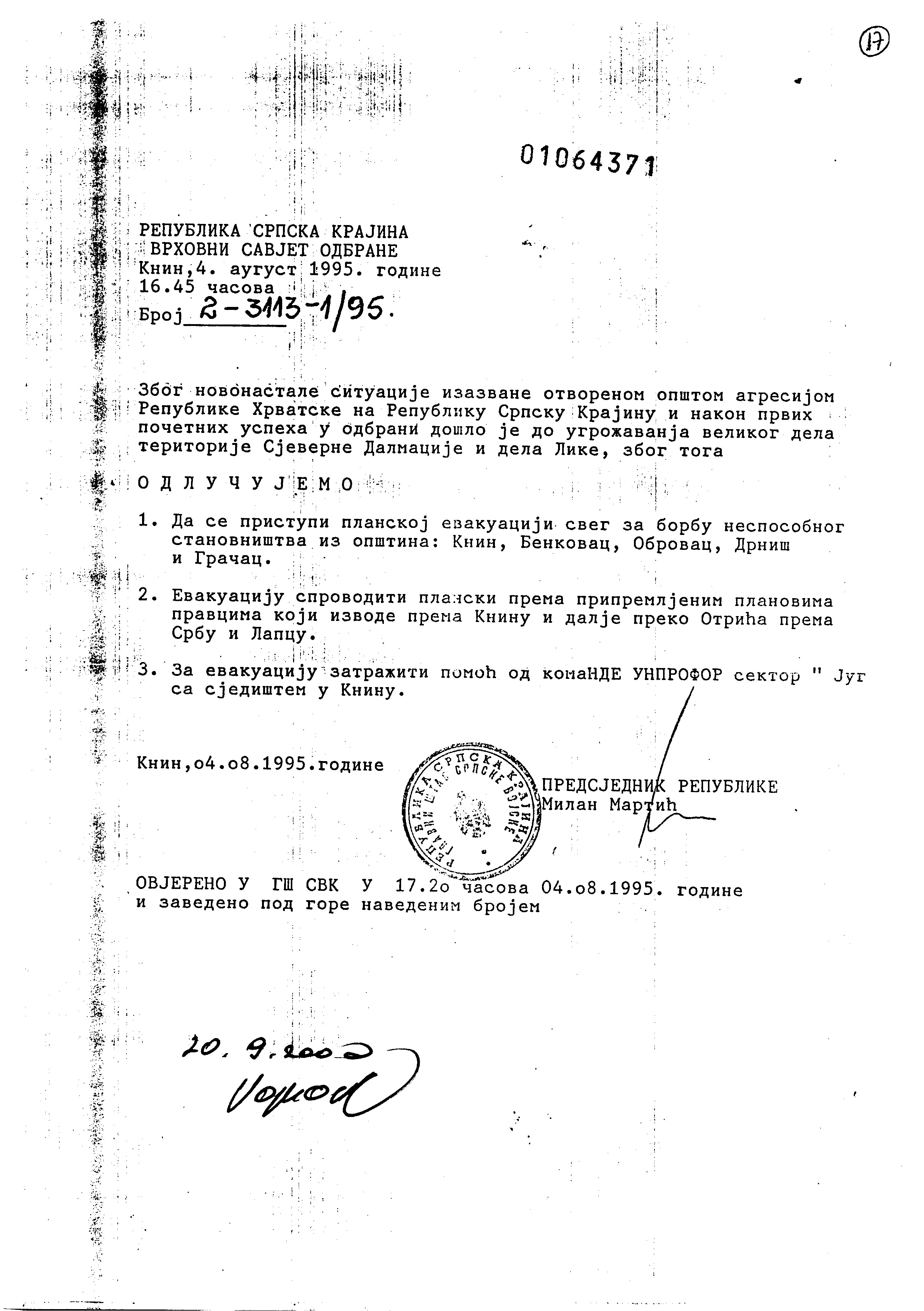
The order to evacuate ethnic Serbs from RSK territory, issued by the Krajina Defence Council and signed by Milan Martić; 4 August 1995

Following the rejection by both sides of the Z-4 plan for reintegration, the RSK's end came in 1995, when Croatian forces gained control of SAO Western Slavonia in Operation Flash (May) followed by the biggest part of occupied Croatia in Operation Storm (August). The Krajina Serb Supreme Defence Council met under president Milan Martić to discuss the situation. A decision was reached at 16:45 to "start evacuating the population unfit for military service from the municipalities of Knin, Benkovac, Obrovac, Drniš and Gračac." The RSK was disbanded and most of its Serb population (from 150,000 to 200,000 people) fled. Only 5,000 to 6,000 people remained, mostly the elderly. Croatian historian Ivo Goldstein wrote, "The reasons for the Serb exodus are complex. Some had to leave because the Serb army had forced them to, while others feared the revenge of the Croatian army or of their former Croat neighbors, whom they had driven away and whose homes they had mostly looted (and it was later shown that this fear was far from groundless)". Most of the refugees fled to today's Serbia, Bosnia, and eastern Slavonia. Some of those who refused to leave were murdered, tortured and forcibly expelled by the Croatian Army and police.

== Later events ==
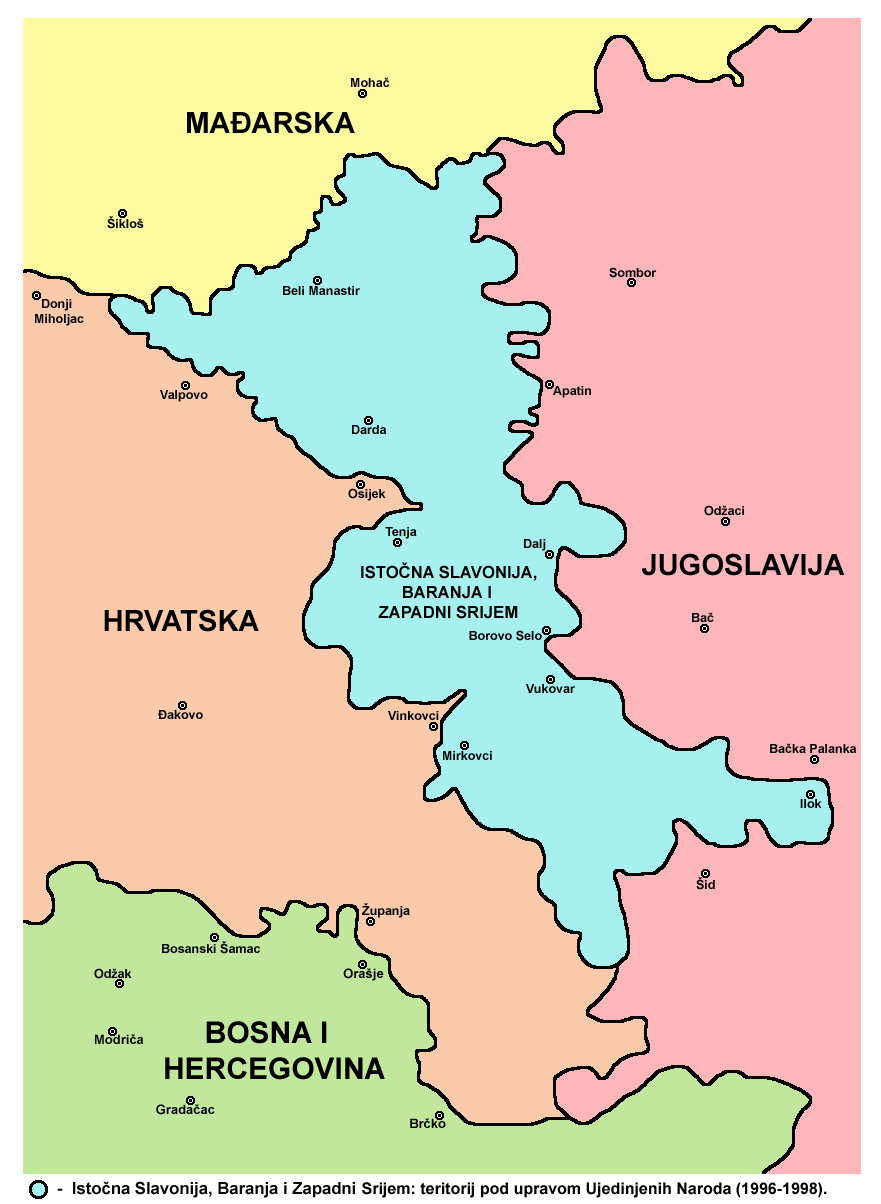
Map of the remaining Krajina territory in eastern Croatia

The parts of the former RSK in eastern Croatia (along with the Danube) remained in place, in what was previously the SAO Eastern Slavonia, Baranja and Western Syrmia.

In 1995, Milan Milanović, formerly a Republic of Serbian Krajina official, signed the Erdut Agreement as a representative of the Serbian side. This agreement, co-signed by the representative of the Croatian Government, was sponsored by the United Nations, and it set up a transitional period during which the United Nations Transitional Authority for Eastern Slavonia, Baranja and Western Sirmium (UNTAES) peacekeeping mission would oversee a peaceful reintegration of this territory into Croatia, starting on 15 January 1996. In 1998, the UNTAES mission was complete and the territory was formally returned to Croatia. Based on the Erdut Agreement, the Joint Council of Municipalities was established in the region in 1997.

After the peaceful reintegration, two islands on the Danube, the Island of Šarengrad and the Island of Vukovar, remained under Serbian military control. In 2004, the Serbian military was withdrawn from the islands and replaced with Serbian police. The islands remain an open question as the Croatian side insists on applying Badinter Arbitration Committee decisions.

In 1995 a Croatian court sentenced former RSK president Goran Hadžić in absentia to 20 years in prison for rocket attacks on Šibenik and Vodice. In 1999 he was sentenced to an additional 20 years for war crimes in Tenja, near Osijek, and in 2002 Croatia's state attorney brought another indictment against him for the murder of almost 1,300 Croats in Vukovar, Osijek, Vinkovci, Županja and elsewhere. On 4 June 2004, the ICTY indicted him on 14 counts of war crimes and crimes against humanity. In 2011 he was arrested and extradited to the Hague, where his initial trial hearing was held on 25 July the same year. In 2014 he was diagnosed with terminal brain cancer; he died two years later at the age of 57. The ICTY trial was terminated upon his death.

Former RSK president Milan Babić was indicted for war crimes by the International Criminal Tribunal for the former Yugoslavia (ICTY) in 2004 and was the first ever indictee to plead guilty and enter a plea bargain with the prosecution, after which he was sentenced to 13 years in prison. He was charged with five counts of crimes against humanity and violations of the laws and customs of war. After he was sentenced in 2004, Babić was found dead in his prison cell in The Hague in March 2006, in an apparent suicide.

Former RSK president Milan Martić was indicted for war crimes by the ICTY in 2005 was convicted of war crimes on 12 June 2007 and sentenced to 35 years in prison where he was transferred to in 2009. He is serving his sentence in Estonia. According to the ICTY, in the amended indictment, he "helped organize an ethnic cleansing campaign of Croats and other non-Serbs from Krajina and virtually the entire non-Serb population was forcibly removed, deported or killed".

Between 2001 and 2012, the ICTY had prosecuted Croatian generals Ante Gotovina, Mladen Markač and Ivan Čermak in the Trial of Gotovina et al for their involvement in crimes committed during and in the aftermath of Operation Storm. The indictment and the subsequent trial on charges of crimes against humanity and violations of the laws or customs of war described several killings, widespread arson and looting committed by Croatian soldiers. In April 2011, Gotovina and Markač were convicted and given prison sentences, while Čermak was acquitted. Gotovina and Markač appealed the verdict and in November 2012 the Appeals Chamber of the ICTY overturned their convictions, acquitting them. Both of them were accused of being part of the "criminal enterprise" but the Court concluded there was no such conspiracy.

After the war, a number of towns and municipalities that had comprised the RSK were designated Areas of Special State Concern.

== Demographics ==
According to the indictment of prosecutor Carla Del Ponte against Slobodan Milošević at the ICTY, the Croat and non-Serb population from the 1991 census was approximately as follows:

Census (1991)	Serbs	Croats	Others	Total
Later RSK total	245,800 (52.3%)	168,000 (35.8%)	55,900 (11.9%)	469,700
UNPA Sector North and South	170,100 (67%)	70,700 (28%)	13,100 (5%)	253,900
SAO Western Slavonia	14,200 (60%)	6,900 (29%)	2,600 (11%)	23,700
SAO SBWS	61,500 (32%)	90,500 (47%)	40,200 (21%)	192,200

Thus Serbs comprised 52.3% and Croats 35.8% of the population of SAO Krajina respectively in 1991.

According to data set forth at the meeting of the Government of the RSK in July 1992, its ethnic composition was 88% Serbs, 7% Croats, 5% others. As of November 1993, less than 400 ethnic Croats still resided in UNPA Sector South, and between 1,500 and 2,000 remained in UNPA Sector North.

=== Towns ===
Towns which were at one point part of RSK or occupied by the RSK's army:

- Beli Manastir
- Benkovac
- Biskupija
- Boričevac
- Borovo
- Cetingrad
- Donji Lapac
- Drniš
- Dubica
- Dvor
- Erdut
- Ervenik
- Glina
- Gračac
- Gvozd
- Jagodnjak
- Jasenovac
- Kistanje
- Knin
- Korenica
- Kostajnica
- Krnjak
- Lovinac
- Majur
- Markušica
- Maslenica
- Negoslavci
- Nunić
- Obrovac
- Okučani
- Petrinja
- Plitvička Jezera
- Plaski
- Rakovica
- Saborsko
- Slunj
- Sveti Rok
- Šodolovci
- Strmica
- Sunja
- Topusko
- Trpinja
- Udbina
- Vojnić
- Vrhovine
- Vrlika
- Vukovar

== Status ==
Serbian Krajina has been described as a "proto-state" and "parastate".

=== Legal status ===
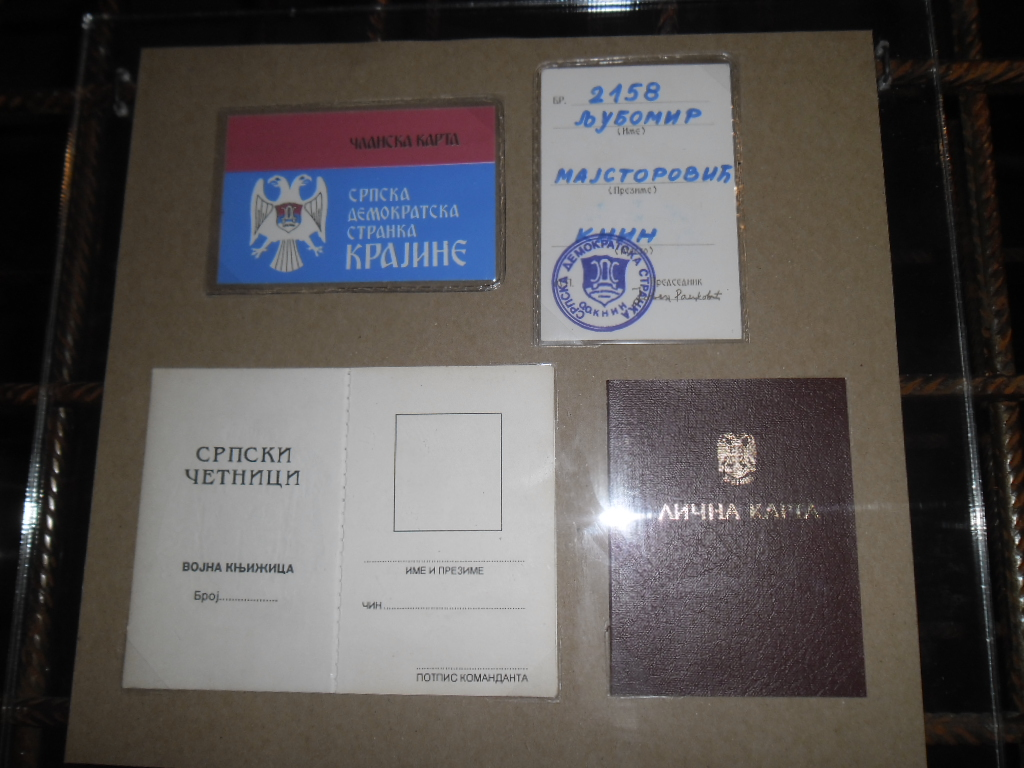
Republic of Serbian Krajina documents

During its existence, this entity did not achieve international recognition. On 29 November 1991, the Badinter commission concluded that Yugoslavia was "in dissolution" and that the republics – including Croatia – should be recognized as independent states when they asked so. They also assigned these republics territorial integrity. For most of the world, this was a reason to recognize Croatia. However, Serbia did not accept the conclusions of the commission in that period and recognized Croatia only after Croatian military actions (Oluja and Bljesak) and the Dayton agreement.

On 20 November 1991 Lord Carrington asked Badinter commission: "Does the Serbian population in Croatia and Bosnia and Herzegovina, as one of the constituent peoples of Yugoslavia, have the right to self-determination?" The commission concluded on 11 January 1992 "that the Serbian population in Bosnia and Herzegovina and Croatia is entitled to all the rights concerned to minorities and ethnic groups[...]" and "that the Republics must afford the members of those minorities and ethnic groups all the human rights and fundamental freedoms recognized in international law, including, where appropriate, the right to choose their nationality".

=== Support and funding ===
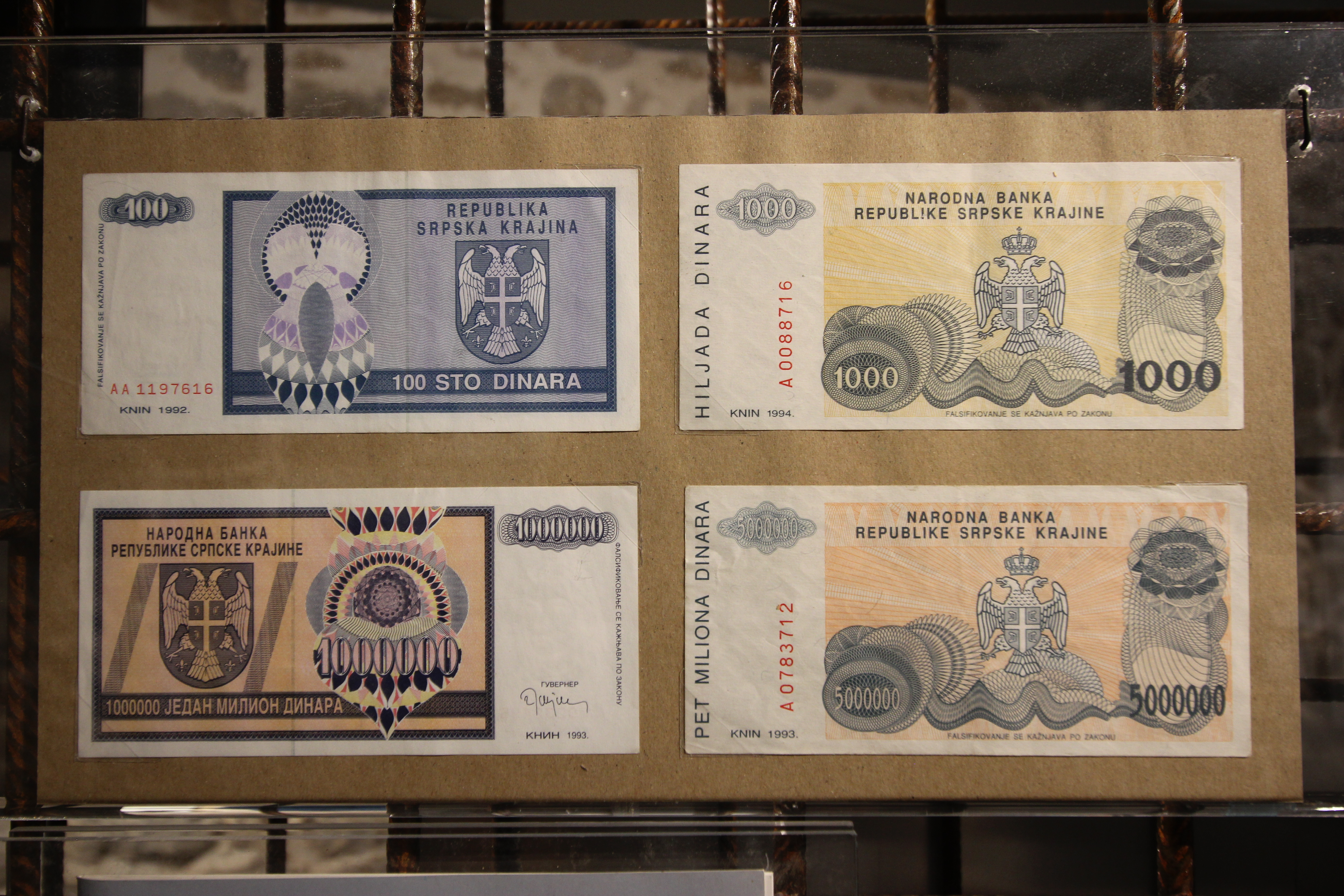
Krajina dinar

Milan Babić, former President of Serbian Krajina, testified to the International Criminal Tribunal for the former Yugoslavia (ICTY) that Krajina was provided with weapons by Slobodan Milošević's government in Serbia, and that Krajina was economically and financially dependent upon Serbia. Babić testified that Milošević held de facto control over both the Serbian Army of Krajina (SVK) and the Yugoslav People's Army (JNA) during its actions in Krajina via an alternate chain of command through the Serbian police.

== Government ==
=== Presidents ===
No.	Portrait	Name (Birth–Death)	Term of office	Time in office	Party
1		Milan Babić; Милан Бабић (1956–2006)	19 December 1991 – 16 February 1992	59 days	Serb Democratic Party
—		Mile Paspalj; Миле Паспаљ (born 1953); Acting	16 February 1992 – 26 February 1992	10 days	Serb Democratic Party
2		Goran Hadžić; Горан Хаџић (1958–2016)	26 February 1992 – 26 January 1994	1 year, 334 days	Serb Democratic Party
3		Milan Martić; Милан Мартић (born 1954)	26 January 1994 – 7 August 1995	1 year, 193 days	Serb Party of Socialists

=== Prime ministers ===
No.	Portrait	Name (Birth–Death)	Term of office	Time in office	Party
1		Dušan Vještica; Душан Вјештица	19 December 1991 – 16 February 1992	59 days	Serb Democratic Party
—		Risto Matković; Ристо Матковић (born 1947); Acting	16 February 1992 – 26 February 1992	10 days	Serb Democratic Party
2		Zdravko Zečević; Здравко Зечевић	26 February 1992 – 21 April 1993	1 year, 54 days	Serb Democratic Party
3		Đorđe Bjegović; Ђорђе Бјеговић (born 1941)	21 April 1993 – 27 March 1994	340 days	Serb Party of Socialists
4		Borislav Mikelić; Борислав Микелић (1939–2018)	27 March 1994 – 27 July 1995	1 year, 122 days	Independent
5		Milan Babić; Милан Бабић (1956–2006)	27 July 1995 – 7 August 1995	11 days	Serb Democratic Party

=== Speaker of the National Assembly ===
- Mile Paspalj

== Military ==
The RSK maintained its own military force called the Serbian Army of Krajina, at its height it consisted of around 30,000 personnel. Created through the merger of the Territorial Defense of the Republic of Serbian Krajina (TORSK), units of the JNA and the Krajina Militia, the SVK was officially established on 19 March 1992. Responsible for the security of the RSK, its area of responsibility covered an area of some 17,028 km² at its peak. The army was located entirely inland and thus had no naval forces. It was planned that it would consist of 80,000 personnel, however it turned out to be less. The SVK ceased to exist in 1995 following Operation Storm.

== See also ==
- 1993–94 Republic of Serbian Krajina general election
- Republika Srpska
- Serbs of Croatia

== Annotations ==
1. The proper translation from Serbian Srpska Krajina is Serb Krajina.

== Sources ==
Books

- Baker, Catherine (2015). The Yugoslav Wars of the 1990s. Macmillan International Higher Education. ISBN 9781137398994.
- Barić, Nikica (2005). Srpska pobuna u Hrvatskoj 1990-1995 (in Croatian). Zagreb: Golden marketing, Tehnička knjiga. ISBN 953-212-249-4.
- Dakić, M.; Macura, L.; Žutić, N. (1994). Српска Краjина: историjски темељи и настанак. Knin: Iskra. ISBN 86-82393-01-8.
- Horvat, Rudolf (1906). Najnovije doba hrvatske povijesti. Zagreb: Matica hrvatska.
- Ilić, Jovan (1995). The Serbian question in the Balkans. Faculty of Geography, University of Belgrade. ISBN 9788682657019.
- Krestić, V. (1996). "Republika Srpska Krajina". Državno i istorijsko pravo Hrvatske: koreni zla i sukoba sa Srbima. Topusko: SKD Sava Mrkalj. pp. 95–102.
- Novaković, Kosta (2009). Српска Краjина: (успони, падови уздизања). Knin: SKD Zora. ISBN 978-86-83809-54-7.
- Pavkovic, Aleksandar (2000). The Fragmentation of Yugoslavia: Nationalism and War in the Balkans. Springer. ISBN 978-0-230-28584-2.
- Radan, Peter; Pavkovic, Aleksandar (2013). The Ashgate Research Companion to Secession. Ashgate Publishing, Ltd. ISBN 978-1-4094-7652-8.
- Rašković, Jovo (1998). Srpska Krajina, avgust 1995, izgon : žrtve agresije Hrvatske vojske na Republiku Srpsku Krajinu (Oluja) Sjeverna Dalmacija, Lika, Banija, i Kordun [Serb Krajina, August 1995, exodus : victims of Croat aggression to the Republic of Serb Krajina (Operation "Storm"), North Dalmatia, Lika, Banija and Kordun]. Svetigora. ISBN 978-86-7092-003-3.
- Sekulić, Milisav (2000). Knin je pao u Beogradu. Nidda Verlag.
- Štrbac, Savo (2015). Gone with the Storm: A Chronicle of Ethnic Cleansing of Serbs from Croatia. Knin, Banja Luka, Beograd: Grafid, DIC Veritas. ISBN 9789995589806.

Journals

- Pavlaković, V. (2013). "Symbols and the culture of memory in Republika Srpska Krajina". Nationalities Papers. 41 (6): 893–909. doi:10.1080/00905992.2012.743511. S2CID 153965465.
- Kolstø, P.; Paukovic, D. (2014). "The Short and Brutish Life of Republika Srpska Krajina: Failure of a De Facto State". Ethnopolitics. 13 (4): 309–327. doi:10.1080/17449057.2013.864805. S2CID 144097806.
- Vego, Marko (October 1993). "The Army of Serbian Krajina". Jane's Intelligence Review. 5 (10): 493–.
- Cigar, N. (1993). "The Serbo-Croatian war, 1991: Political and military dimensions". The Journal of Strategic Studies. 16 (3): 297–338. doi:10.1080/01402399308437521.
- Grandits, H.; Leutloff, C. (2003). "Discourses, Actors, Violence: The Organisation of War-escalation in the Krajina region of Croatia 1990—91". Potentials of Disorder: Explaining Conflict and Stability in the Caucasus and in the Former Yugoslavia: 23–45.
- Doder, D. (1993). "Yugoslavia: new war, old hatreds". Foreign Policy. 91 (91): 3–23. doi:10.2307/1149057. JSTOR 1149057.
- Ashbrook, J.; Bakich, S. D. (2010). "Storming to Partition: Croatia, the United States, and Krajina in the Yugoslav War". Small Wars & Insurgencies. 21 (4): 537–560. doi:10.1080/09592318.2010.518852. S2CID 143824950.

Documents

- Jarčević, S., ed. (2005). Republika Srpska Krajina: državna dokumenta. Agencija "Miroslav"; Kosmos.
- "Final Report of the United Nations Commission of Experts, 28 December 1994: The military structure, strategy and tactics of the warring factions". UN. Archived from the original on 28 July 2012.

Cleanup

- "Operation Storm – Attack on the Krajina", Jane's Intelligence Review, 1 November 1995
- (in Serbian) Дакић М. Крајина кроз вијекове: из историjе политичких, националних и људских права српског народа у Хрватскоj. — Београд, 2002.
- (in Serbian) Радуловиħ С. Судбина Краjине. — Београд: Дан Граф, 1996. — 189 с.
- (in Serbian) Радослав И. Чубрило, Биљана Р. Ивковић, Душан Ђаковић, Јован Адамовић, Милан Ђ. Родић и др. Српска Крајина. — Београд: Матић, 2011. — 742 с.
- (in Serbian) Република Српска Краjина: десет година послиjе / [уредник Вељко Ђурић Мишина]. — Београд: Добра Вольа, 2005. — 342 с. — ISBN 86-83905-04-7
- (in Serbian) Република Српска Краjина: десет година послиjе. Књ. 2 / [уредник Вељко Ђурић Мишина]. — Београд: Добра Вольа, 2005. — 250 с. — ISBN 86-83905-05-5
- (in Serbian) Штрбац, Саво Рат и ријеч. — Бања Лука: Графид, 2011. — 190 с. — ISBN 9789993853749
