= Milan Babić =

First President of the Republic of Serbian Krajina 1991–1992

- Милан Бабић
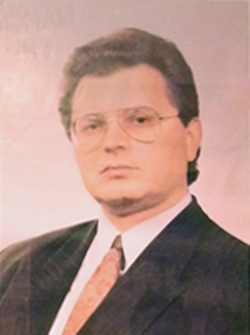
- Babić in 1993

5th Prime Minister of the Republic of Serbian Krajina
- In office 27 July 1995 – 7 August 1995
- President: Milan Martić
- Preceded by: Borislav Mikelić
- Succeeded by: Position abolished

1st President of the Republic of Serbian Krajina
- In office 19 December 1991 – 16 February 1992
- Prime Minister: Dušan Vještica
- Preceded by: Position established
- Succeeded by: Goran Hadžić

2nd President of the Serb Democratic Party
- In office December 1990 – 7 August 1995
- Preceded by: Jovan Rašković
- Succeeded by: Position abolished

Personal details
- Born: 25 February 1956 Kukar, PR Croatia, FPR Yugoslavia (modern Croatia)
- Died: 5 March 2006 (aged 50) The Hague, Netherlands
- Cause of death: Suicide by hanging
- Party: Serb Democratic

Milan Babić (Serbian Cyrillic: Милан Бабић; 25 February 1956 – 5 March 2006) was a Croatian Serb former dental specialist, politician and convicted war criminal who served as the first president of the Republic of Serbian Krajina, a self-proclaimed state largely populated by Serbs of Croatia that wished to break away from Croatia during the Croatian War of Independence.

After the war, he was indicted for war crimes by the International Criminal Tribunal for the former Yugoslavia (ICTY) in 2004 and was the first ever indictee to plead guilty and enter a plea bargain with the prosecution, after which he was sentenced to 13 years in prison. Babić expressed "shame and remorse" in a public statement and asked his "Croatian brothers to forgive their Serb brothers" for their actions.

After he was sentenced in 2004, Babić was found dead in his prison cell in The Hague in March 2006, in an apparent suicide.

== Early life ==
Milan Babić, the son of Božo Babić, was born in 1956 in the village of Kukar near the town of Vrlika, in PR Croatia, FPR Yugoslavia. In 1981, he graduated from Belgrade University's School of Dentistry and became a stomatologist. In 1989, he became one of the directors of the medical centre in Knin, a largely Serb-inhabited town in southwestern Croatia.

He entered politics in 1990, as Yugoslavia began to disintegrate, leaving his membership in the League of Communists of Croatia (SKH) and joining the newly established Serb nationalist party called the Serb Democratic Party (SDS) at its inception, on 17 February 1990. He was elected President of the Municipal Assembly of Knin shortly afterwards. At the time, Serbs comprised about 12.2% of Croatia's population, forming a majority in a strip of land known as "Krajina" along the Croatian-Bosnian border. Croatia's move towards independence following the election of President Franjo Tuđman in late 1990 was strongly opposed by its ethnic Serb minority, which was supported both politically and militarily by the Yugoslav People's Army (JNA) and SR Serbia under President Slobodan Milošević. Serb nationalists in the Krajina then established a Serbian National Council, a body designed to coordinate Serb opposition to Croatia's independence; Babić was elected its President.

== Croatian war ==
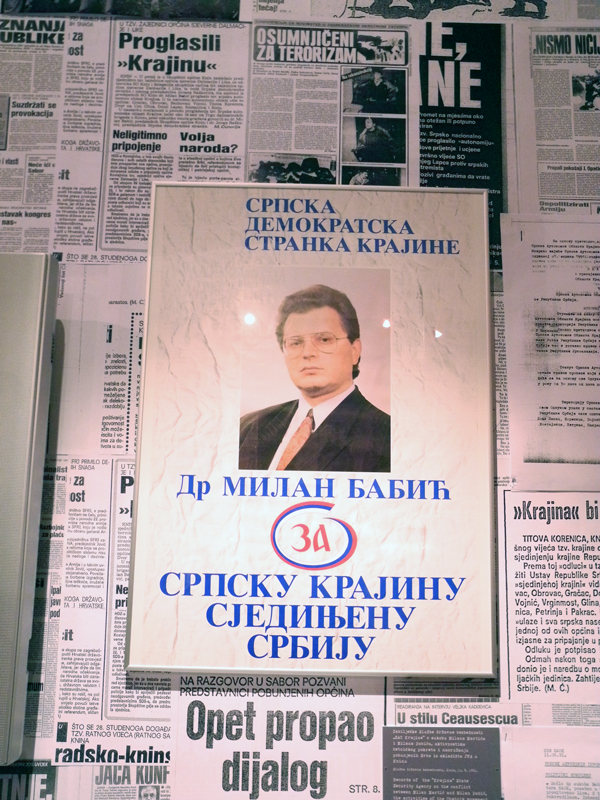
A flyer advertising Milan Babić during the election

Ethnic Serbs soon became hostile to remaining in an independent Croatia. After Tuđman was elected, Croatia's first democratic constitution was drafted, which demoted ethnic Serbs to a minority status within the country.

In September 1990, a referendum was held in the Krajina asking local voters if they agreed with Serb "sovereignty and autonomy" in Croatia, which was passed by a majority of 99.7%. The vote was declared illegal and invalid by the Croatian government. Babić's administration in Knin then announced the creation of a Serb Autonomous Oblast, named SAO Krajina, on 21 December 1990, and on 1 April 1991 it declared that it would secede from Croatia to join Serbia. Other Serb-dominated communities in eastern Croatia announced that they also would join the SAO.

Babić was elected President of the Executive Council of the SAO on April 30, and was subsequently appointed Minister of the Interior and Minister of Defence by the Krajina Serb Assembly. In this capacity, he established an armed militia which set up road blocks in its territory, effectively severing the southern Croatian coastal region of Dalmatia from the rest of the country. Clashes between Krajina Serbs and Croatian security forces broke out almost immediately after Croatia declared independence on June 25, leaving dozens dead.

Around August 1991, Babić became a party to what war crimes prosecutors would later describe as a "joint criminal enterprise" to permanently forcibly remove the non-Serb population of the territory under his control, with the ultimate goal of making the region part of a new Serb-dominated state. According to prosecutors, his chief accomplices included Slobodan Milošević, other Krajina Serb figures such as Milan Martić, the Serb paramilitary leader Vojislav Šešelj, and Yugoslav Army commanders including General Ratko Mladić, at the time the commander of JNA forces in Croatia. All of them were indicted for war crimes, and some have been convicted. According to Babić's testimony during his war crimes trial, during the summer of 1991 the Serbian secret police – under Milošević's command – set up "a parallel structure of state security and the police of Krajina and units commanded by the state security of Serbia". A full-scale war was launched in which a large area of territory, amounting to a third of Croatia, was seized and the non-Serb population was either massacred or ethnically cleansed. The bulk of the fighting occurred between August and December 1991. Thousands more died and were deported in fighting in eastern Slavonia, but the JNA was the principal actor in that part of the conflict.

The international community attempted to resolve the conflict in November 1991 by proposing a peace plan put forward by the United Nations Special Envoy Cyrus Vance, under which the Krajina would be demilitarised and protected by a UN peacekeeping force while political talks on its future took place. Babić opposed the plan. Meanwhile, the SAO Republic of Serbian Krajina (RSK) was renamed on 19 December 1991 and later absorbed the Serb-held areas of eastern Croatia in February 1992. He urged the Krajina Serb Assembly to reject the Vance plan. However, Milošević disagreed with this position. Babić was sidelined and the Vance plan was pushed through the RSK Assembly on 16 February 1992. On 26 February 1992, Milošević engineered Babić's removal in favour of Goran Hadžić, a more pliant figure who was reported to have boasted that he was merely "a messenger for Slobodan Milošević".

Although Babić remained active in RSK politics as its Minister of Foreign Affairs, he was by then a greatly weakened figure. Babić stated that Krajina policy was controlled from Belgrade via the Serbian secret police; Milošević later denied this, claiming that Babić had made it up "out of fear".

On 3 July 1992, The Washington Post reported that aides to Milan Babić said he had been shot "...in an attack by bodyguards of a rival leader and was 'fighting for his life'..." General elections were held in the RSK on 12 December 1993, with a second round of the presidential election on 23 January 1994. Martić received 54,000 fewer votes than Babić in the first round, but went on to win the second round with 104,234 votes.

The Bosnian Serbs' military collapse in July–August 1995 propelled Babić into the post of RSK Prime Minister, but he held this for only a few weeks. In early August 1995, the Croatian government launched Operation Storm to retake the entire area of the Krajina (with the exception of the strip in eastern Slavonia, which remained under Serb control until 1998). Babić fled to Serbia along with the entire Krajina Serb leadership and 200,000 Serbian refugees from the region (most of the Serb population in Krajina). He was said to have retired to a chicken farm in Vojvodina.

== Trial and plea bargain ==
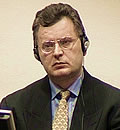
Babić on trial

In December 2002, Babić was unexpectedly revealed as a witness against Slobodan Milošević as part of his plea bargain, testifying before the ICTY that Milošević had been personally involved in the war in Croatia. The following November, he was charged with five counts of crimes against humanity and violations of the laws and customs of war. Although he did not initially enter a plea, he pleaded guilty on 27 January 2004 to one count of crime against humanity in an apparent plea bargain with ICTY prosecutors under which the remaining charges were dropped. He expressed "shame and remorse" in a public statement and declared that he had acted to relieve the collective burden of guilt of the Croatian Serbs, asking his "Croatian brothers to forgive their Serb brothers" for their actions. His confession to the charge of persecution, a crime against humanity, marked a major victory for the ICTY prosecutors, as Babić was, prior to his death, the only participant in the Croatian war to admit guilt. His testimony was of great importance to the prosecution in bolstering their contention that Milošević was the main actor in the "joint criminal enterprise" in Croatia.

In his own trial, Babić gave testimony that was used to indict Milošević. The former also appeared at the trial of the latter to give evidence. In one case, Milošević denied that he supported Babić by quoting transcripts of his tapped telephone, where he referred to Babić as "an idiot", "ordinary scum" and "Tuđman's trump."

In June 2004, Babić was sentenced to 13 years in prison after the court rejected the prosecutors' recommendation for an 11-year sentence. The court found him more responsible than the prosecutor characterized him as, but also gave Babić credit for voluntarily surrendering and pleading guilty. The court found that while "Babić was not the prime mover ... Babić chose to remain in power and provided significant support for the persecutions." Babić was sent to a secret location in Great Britain to serve his sentence, which was an unprecedented move by the court. This led to speculations that Babić had been given a privileged treatment in exchange for his testimony against other defendants. The official justification given for not disclosing his location was concern for his safety from people against whom he testified.

Fellow Serb leaders and commanders that Babić accused for war crimes in Croatia, during his trial in The Hague, involved Slobodan Milošević, Milan Martić, Jovica Stanišić, Franko Simatović, and Momčilo Krajišnik.

== Death ==
Milan Babić was found dead after he reportedly committed suicide on 5 March 2006 while in the ICTY detention unit in The Hague, Netherlands, where he was in the midst of giving evidence against Milan Martić, his successor as President of the breakaway RSK. The New York Times reported that Babić had hanged himself "using his own leather belt."

Serbian Radical Party leader and fellow inmate, Vojislav Šešelj, claimed to have contributed to Babić's suicide by "making his life miserable." Šešelj added that the ICTY prosecution initially promised Babić that it would not press charges if he agreed to testify against fellow Serbs. The charges were pressed anyway (on one count).
