= Grubori massacre =

1995 mass killing by the Croatian Army in Grubori, Croatia

- Location: Grubori, Plavno, Croatia
- Date: 25 August 1995
- Target: Elderly Croatian Serb villagers
- Attack type: Mass killing
- Deaths: 6
- Perpetrator: Croatian Army (HV)

The Grubori massacre was the mass murder of six Serb civilians from the village of Grubori, near Knin, on 25 August 1995 by members of the Croatian Army (HV) in the aftermath of Operation Storm. The massacre was listed in the ICTY's indictment of Croatian wartime generals Ante Gotovina, Ivan Čermak and Mladen Markač.

At the completion of the trial in 2011, Čermak was acquitted while Gotovina and Markač were both convicted of various crimes. They were acquitted on appeal in 2012. In 2010, three members of the Lučko Anti-Terrorist Unit, Franjo Drlje, Božo Krajina and Igor Beneta, were indicted and put on trial at the Zagreb Country Court for the crime. Beneta committed suicide, while Drljo and Krajina were acquitted. The verdict was quashed by the Supreme Court and a re-trial in 2016 ended with the same outcome.

== Background ==
By March 1991, tensions between Croats and Serbs escalated into the Croatian War of Independence. Following a referendum on independence that was largely boycotted by Croatian Serbs, the Croatian parliament officially adopted independence on 25 June. The Republic of Serb Krajina (RSK) declared its intention to secede from Croatia and join the Republic of Serbia while the Government of the Republic of Croatia declared it a rebellion. Between August 1991 and February 1992, the RSK initiated an ethnic cleansing campaign to drive out the Croat and non-Serb population from RSK-held territory, eventually expelling as many as 250,000 people according to Human Rights Watch. Croatian forces also engaged in ethnic cleansing against Serbs in Eastern and Western Slavonia and parts of the Krajina on a more limited scale. On 4 August 1995, the Croatian Army (HV) launched Operation Storm to retake the Krajina region which was completed successfully by 7 August. The Operation resulted in the exodus of approximately 200,000 Serbs from Krajina while those Serbs who were unable or unwilling to leave their homes, primarily the elderly, were subjected to various crimes. The ICTY puts the number of Serb civilians killed at 324.

== Killings ==
The killings in Grubori happened amid an operation in the area involving 560 special policemen, just after the Croatian military’s Operation Storm which seized back parts of the country that had been under Serb control. The operation was meant to secure the passage of a train from Zagreb to Split via Knin, which carried President Franjo Tuđman, who was giving speeches at various stops to praise the Croatian Army for liberating the area.

Of the 13 people living in Grubori on 25 August, seven survived: six women and a man, all elderly. They happened to be in another village, attempting to get official documents enabling them to leave Croatia, when the killings occurred. As they were returning to the village on foot, they saw smoke rising from the hills. U.N. officials arrived at Grubori within hours of the massacre and were able to file a detailed report of what they saw. The victims were 80-year old Miloš Grubor, who was shot behind his ear and in his back as he lay in bed in his pajamas, 65-year old Jovo Grubor, who was found in a field with his throat either slashed or destroyed by an exploding bullet, 41-year old Đuro Karanović and Mika Grubor, 51, who were found shot through the head in another field, 90-year old Marija Grubor, who was found in her torched house and 73-year old Jovan-Damjan Grubor.

== Trials ==
=== Gotovina et al ===
The massacre was included in the ICTY's indictment against former Croatian generals Ante Gotovina, Ivan Čermak and Mladen Markač. The Trial of Gotovina et al brought the convictions of Gotovina and Markač and acquittal of Čermak in April 2011. Gotovina and Markač were subsequently acquitted on appeal in November 2012, with the Appeals Chamber of the ICTY reversing the earlier judgement, ruling that there was insufficient evidence to prove the existence of a joint criminal enterprise to remove Serb civilians by force. The Appeals Chamber further stated that the Croatian Army and Special Police committed crimes after the artillery assault, but the state and military leadership had no role in their planning and creation.

=== Lučko unit ===
In 2010, the Zagreb County State Court indicted three members of the Lučko Anti-Terrorist Unit for the massacre: Franjo Drljo, Božo Krajina and Igor Beneta. In 2011, Beneta committed suicide. Drljo and Krajina were tried and subsequently acquitted of the charges. In December 2015, their acquittals were quashed by the Supreme Court and a re-trial was ordered. In February 2016, Zagreb County Court acquitted Drljo and Krajina again but the State Attorney’s Office launched another appeal, which was dismissed by the Supreme Court on 19 September 2019. The two men were reportedly acquitted due to lack of evidence, though the trial established that Drljo’s and Krajina’s superiors from the Lučko unit had tried to cover up the killings. Court documents from the ICTY reveal that after the killings, a story was conceived that the unit had clashed with Serb soldiers.

== Commemoration ==
On 25 August 2020, President of Croatia Zoran Milanović and Minister of Croatian Veterans Tomo Medved, along with Croatian Serb politicians, MP Milorad Pupovac and Deputy Prime Minister Boris Milošević attended a commemoration in the village of Grubori where a cross had been recently erected for the victims of the massacre. Earlier in the month, Milošević attended Operation Storm commemoration in Knin.

== See also ==
- Golubić killings
- Gošić killings
- Kijani killings
- Komić killings
- Uzdolje killings
- Varivode massacre
