= Komić =

- Interactive map of Komić
- Location within Croatia
- Coordinates: 44°27′N 15°45′E
- Country: Croatia
- County: Lika-Senj
- Municipality: Udbina

Area
  - Total: 36.2 km^{2} (14.0 sq mi)

Population (2021)
  - Total: 14
  - Density: 0.39/km^{2} (1.0/sq mi)
- Time zone: UTC+1 (CET)
  - Summer (DST): UTC+2 (CEST)

Komić (Serbian Cyrillic: Комић) is a village in the Udbina municipality in the Lika region of central Croatia. The 2011 population was 20.

== History ==
Near the village once was the Fort Komić which was built by Kurjaković family in the 14th century.

Nine elderly Serb civilians were massacred by the Croatian Army in the aftermath of Operation Storm in August 1995.

== Demographics ==
The 1712–14 census of Lika and Krbava registered 349 inhabitants, out of whom 348 were Serbian Orthodox ("Vlach"), 1 were Catholic Bunjevci.

The 1991 population was 153, 99% ethnic Serbs.

== Notable people ==
- Đorđe Lavrnić
