= August 1995 Bosanski Petrovac refugee column bombing =

August 1995 bombing of Serb refugee column

- Part of Operation Storm during the Croatian War of Independence
- Bosanski Petrovac (Bosnia and Herzegovina)
- Location: 44°34′00″N 16°31′20″E near Bosanski Petrovac, Bosnia and Herzegovina
- Date: 7–8 August 1995
- Deaths: 9
- Victim: Croatian Serb refugees
- Perpetrator: Croatian Air Force

On 7 August 1995, two Croatian Air Force MiG-21 planes fired several rockets at a Serb refugee column on a road near Bosanski Petrovac, Bosnia and Herzegovina, killing 9 civilians and injuring more than 50. On 8 August 1995, another attack took place, resulting in three additional civilian casualties. The victims were traveling in a refugee column fleeing Croatia during Operation Storm which brought about an end to the Croatian War of Independence.

The incidents were described in a 1996 report by Human Rights Watch which noted that the attacks could constitute violations of war if civilians had been deliberately targeted, but that they could be considered collateral damage if Republic of Serb Krajina (RSK) military personnel were involved.

== Background ==
By March 1991, tensions between Croats and Serbs escalated into the Croatian War of Independence. Following a referendum on independence that was largely boycotted by Croatian Serbs, the Croatian parliament officially adopted independence on 25 June. The Republic of Serb Krajina (RSK) declared its intention to secede from Croatia and join the Republic of Serbia while the Government of the Republic of Croatia declared it a rebellion. RSK forces and paramilitaries went on to expel Croats and other non-Serbs from areas where they established control. Meanwhile, Serbs living in Croatian towns, especially near the front lines were subjected to various forms of harassment and attacks.

On 4 August 1995, the Croatian Army, together with the 5th Corps of the Army of the Republic of Bosnia and Herzegovina, launched Operation Storm to regain control of occupied territories of Croatia, and to end the Siege of Bihać. Around 200,000 Serbs fled towards Serbia. The columns of Serb civilians escaping through the town of Dvor came under repeated attack from artillery shelling and small arms fire from both Croatian and Bosnian troops, leading to civilian deaths. UN troops reported the same column came under attack from Croatian fighter jets.

== Events ==
On 7 August, two Croatian Air Force MiG-21 planes fired several rockets at a Serb refugee column located on Petrovačka road near Bosanski Petrovac (Serbo-Croatian: Petrovačka cesta), killing 9 civilians and injuring more than 50. The victims included four children. The columns of refugees had arrived on the territory of Bosnia and Herzegovina from Lika and Dalmatia, and Kordun and Banija. On 8 August, another refugee convoy was shelled near the village of Svodna, also in Bosnia, resulting in three civilian casualties.

== Aftermath and reactions ==
A 1996 report by Human Rights Watch detailing abuses committed during Operation Storm listed bombings of refugee columns by Croatian aircraft on "at least three separate occasions" including near Bosanski Petrovac. It stated that the attacks would constitute violations of the Geneva Conventions and a war crime if civilians had been directly attacked but that if military personnel and materiel had been mixed in and if incidental fighting occurred which resulted in civilian casualties, it could be considered collateral damage. It noted that even in the latter situation, "further investigation is required to determine whether attacking forces fulfilled their obligation to take all feasible precautions to minimise civilian harm". HRW wrote that RSK forces would sometimes be intermingled with fleeing civilians and that according to witnesses, Serbian soldiers and heavy artillery were reportedly part of, or near the refugee columns. Some of the witnesses of the August 7 attack were Croatian Serb soldiers who spoke about transferring military equipment in the convoy to Bosnian Serb forces.

According to the testimonies of survivors of the first bombing, there were no military vehicles or army units in the column, only civilians who were fleeing. Photojournalist Ranko Ćuković, who photographed the Petrovačka road bombing, stated that he did not see military vehicles in the convoy but that there were there were a couple of T84 tanks "not far from it, on a hill, in a small forest".

Serbian historian Kosta Nikolić stated that the lack of "first-class historical sources" makes it difficult to establish who ordered the bombing and when, as well as what goal and task the Croatian pilots were given. Darjan Godić, a historian at the Croatian Institute of History, claimed that there was military equipment in the column which is confirmed by Serbian authors, thus making the column a legitimate war target of the Croatian Army.

In 2003 at the ICTY while under cross-examination by Slobodan Milošević, it was revealed that General Janko Bobetko, former Chief of the General Staff of the Croatian Army accused Imra Agotić, first commander of the Croatian Air Force and Defence of ordering the bombing of the refugee column. Agotić denied any involvement.

In 2012, the Croatian journal Magazine for Military History (Vojna Povijest) published flight logs of Croatian fighter planes from 3 August to 8 August 1995. It described the destruction of military vehicles on 7 August and 8 August in the area near Bosanski Petrovac and Svodna, respectively. Meanwhile, former Minister of Foreign Affairs of Croatia Mate Granić confirmed that Croatian planes struck convoys but claimed that it was a legitimate target against members of the Krajina Serb military, calling the civilian casualties "collateral damage".

On 1 November 2010, the Ministry of Internal Affairs of Republika Srpska submitted reports and evidence to the Prosecutor's Office of Bosnia and Herzegovina against three officers and two pilots of the Croatian Army. The events received renewed publicity in June 2022 when Serbia filed indictments against four Croatian Army officers it alleges were involved in the bombings. One of them is fighter squadron commander Danijel Borovic who was the only one of the named in 2010 to be still alive. The Ministry of Croatian Veterans responded to the indictments by issuing a statement rejecting Serbian jurisdiction over the matter. Croatian Prime Minister Andrej Plenković said that the government would protect the pilots and called the Serbian indictment "a step backward in reconciliation".

In February 2025, The Higher Court in Belgrade proceeded with an in absentia trial of the four Croatian Air Force officers, charging them with war crimes over the two bombings. A preparatory hearing was held in November 2022, but the court sought Croatia’s stance on the matter. Croatian authorities declined to cooperate, refusing to deliver the trial summons. The Croatian government stated that they would use all mechanisms to protect their pilots, and that the trial is politically motivated. Croatia disputes the Serbian judiciary's jurisdiction for alleged acts committed on the territory outside of Serbia by people who are not Serbian citizens and argues that the International Criminal Tribunal for the former Yugoslavia (ICTY) has already investigated the events.
