= Uzdolje killings =

1995 mass killing by the Croatian Army in Uzdolje, Croatia

- Location: Uzdolje, Knin, Croatia
- Date: 6 August 1995
- Target: Elderly Croatian Serb villagers
- Attack type: Mass killing
- Deaths: 10
- Perpetrator: Croatian Army (HV)

The Uzdolje killings was the mass murder of at least ten Croatian Serb civilians from the village of Uzdolje, near Knin on 6 August 1995 by members of the Croatian Army (HV) in the aftermath of Operation Storm.

== Background ==
By March 1991, tensions between Croats and Serbs escalated into the Croatian War of Independence. Following a referendum on independence that was largely boycotted by Croatian Serbs, the Croatian parliament officially adopted independence on 25 June. The Republic of Serb Krajina (RSK) declared its intention to secede from Croatia and join the Republic of Serbia while the Government of the Republic of Croatia declared it a rebellion. Between August 1991 and February 1992, the RSK initiated an ethnic cleansing campaign to drive out the Croat and non-Serb population from RSK-held territory, eventually expelling as many as 250,000 people according to Human Rights Watch. Croatian forces also engaged in ethnic cleansing against Serbs in Eastern and Western Slavonia and parts of the Krajina on a more limited scale. On 4 August 1995, the Croatian Army (HV) launched Operation Storm to retake the Krajina region which was completed successfully by 7 August. The Operation resulted in the exodus of approximately 200,000 Serbs from Krajina while those Serbs who were unable or unwilling to leave their homes, primarily the elderly, were subjected to various crimes. The ICTY puts the number of Serb civilians killed at 324.

== Killings ==
On the morning of 6 August 1995, three men with automatic rifles drove to the hamlet of Šare and into the village of Uzdolje, finding eight people, the oldest of whom was Djudjija Beric, 79 years old. Seven of them were killed near the Knin - Drniš road, while the surviving witness, who was injured, managed to escape into the forest. The other victims were Milica Sare, Stevo Beric, Janja Beric, Krsto Sare, Milos Cosic, Jandrija Sara and 73-year-old Sava Sare, who was killed on her porch afterwards.

In the nearby hamlet of Vrbnik, unknown Croatian soldiers also killed 61- or 62-year-old Lazo Damjanic and 28-year-old Predrag Zaric. Days after Operation Storm, ten other civilians were also killed in surrounding villages.

=== Legal proceedings ===
The killings in the village were included in the ICTY's indictment of former Croatian general Ante Gotovina. In the appeal of the trial of Gotovina et al which acquitted Gotovina and Mladen Markač, the ICTY ruled that there was insufficient evidence to conclude the existence of a joint criminal enterprise to remove Serb civilians by force. The Appeals Chamber further stated that the Croatian Army and Special Police committed crimes after the artillery assault, but the state and military leadership had no role in their planning and creation.

Though no one has been held responsible for these crimes, the Zagreb-based NGO Documenta - Center for Dealing with the Past filed a criminal complaint to the Croatian state attorney’s office in 2017.
