= Golubić killings =

1995 mass killing by the Croatian Army in Golubić, Croatia

- Location: Golubić, Šibenik-Knin County
- Date: 6 August 1995
- Target: Elderly Croatian Serb villagers
- Attack type: Mass killing
- Deaths: 18-19
- Perpetrator: Croatian Army (HV)

The Golubić killings was the mass murder of at least 18 Serb civilians from the village of Golubić in the county of Šibenik-Knin County on 6 August 1995, by members of the Croatian Army (HV) during Operation Storm.

== Background ==
By March 1991, tensions between Croats and Serbs escalated into the Croatian War of Independence. Following a referendum on independence that was largely boycotted by Croatian Serbs, the Croatian parliament officially adopted independence on 25 June. The Republic of Serb Krajina (RSK) declared its intention to secede from Croatia and join the Republic of Serbia while the Government of the Republic of Croatia declared it a rebellion. Between August 1991 and February 1992, the RSK initiated an ethnic cleansing campaign to drive out the Croat and non-Serb population from RSK-held territory, eventually expelling as many as 250,000 people according to Human Rights Watch. Croatian forces also engaged in ethnic cleansing against Serbs in Eastern and Western Slavonia and parts of the Krajina on a more limited scale. On 4 August 1995, the Croatian Army (HV) launched Operation Storm to retake the Krajina region which was completed successfully by 7 August. The Operation resulted in the exodus of approximately 200,000 Serbs from Krajina while those Serbs who were unable or unwilling to leave their homes, primarily the elderly, were subjected to various crimes. The ICTY puts the number of Serb civilians killed at 324. According to the 1991 census, Golubić had 1424 inhabitants of which 1389 were Serbs.

== Killings ==
The Croatian Army (HV) entered the village of Golubić on 5 August. Many of the inhabitants had left to join refugee columns while others stayed behind. 18 or 19 Serb civilians were killed on August 5–6 by members of the Croatian Army. Most of the victims were elderly, killed in the immediate vicinity of their homes with the exception of one group killed on the way from Golubić to the village of Radljevac. One of the victims' son who witnessed the atrocities testified:

My mother was killed around 1 pm on 5 August. I was a 100 meters further away. Hiding behind the willow. There were 14 Croatian Army soldiers. I heard two gunshots. I realized I had to leave. My mother was left lying there, dead. She was 82. They killed her and they cut her arm. Her body lied there for 25 days when they came with bags and buried her in Knin cemetery as Jane Doe. I don’t know how much was left of her in the heat surrounded by dogs and pigs.

== Legal proceedings ==
Several of the murders in Golubić were included in the ICTY's indictment of former Croatian general Ante Gotovina. In the appeal of the trial of Gotovina et al which acquitted Gotovina and Mladen Markač, the ICTY ruled that there was insufficient evidence to conclude the existence of a joint criminal enterprise to remove Serb civilians by force. The Appeals Chamber further stated that the Croatian Army and Special Police committed crimes after the artillery assault, but the state and military leadership had no role in their planning and creation.

No one has been prosecuted for the massacre.
