= Komić killings =

1995 mass killing by the Croatian Army in Kijani, Croatia

- Location: Komić, Croatia
- Date: August 1995
- Target: Elderly Croatian Serb villagers
- Attack type: Mass killing
- Deaths: 9
- Perpetrator: Croatian Army (HV)

The Komić killings refers to the mass murder of elderly Serb civilians from the village of Komić in August 1995 by members of the Croatian Army (HV), five days after Operation Storm.

== Background ==
By March 1991, tensions between Croats and Serbs escalated into the Croatian War of Independence. Following a referendum on independence that was largely boycotted by Croatian Serbs, the Croatian parliament officially adopted independence on 25 June. The Republic of Serb Krajina (RSK) declared its intention to secede from Croatia and join the Republic of Serbia while the Government of the Republic of Croatia declared it a rebellion. Between August 1991 and February 1992, the RSK initiated an ethnic cleansing campaign to drive out the Croat and non-Serb population from RSK-held territory, eventually expelling as many as 250,000 people according to Human Rights Watch. Croatian forces also engaged in ethnic cleansing against Serbs in Eastern and Western Slavonia and parts of the Krajina on a more limited scale. On 4 August 1995, the Croatian Army (HV) launched Operation Storm to retake the Krajina region which was completed successfully by 7 August. The Operation resulted in the exodus of approximately 200,000 Serbs from Krajina while those Serbs who were unable or unwilling to leave their homes, primarily the elderly, were subjected to various crimes. The ICTY puts the number of Serb civilians killed at 324.

== Killings ==
Five days after Operation Storm, HV members entered the Lika village of Komic, killing civilians after burning houses and outbuildings. There were nine victims. According to a U.N. report, three of the victims were burned alive.

=== Legal proceedings ===
Several of the murders in Komić were included in the ICTY's indictment of former Croatian general Ante Gotovina. In the appeal of the trial of Gotovina et al which acquitted Gotovina and Mladen Markač, the ICTY ruled that there was insufficient evidence to conclude the existence of a joint criminal enterprise to remove Serb civilians by force. The Appeals Chamber further stated that the Croatian Army and Special Police committed crimes after the artillery assault, but the state and military leadership had no role in their planning and creation.
