= Cascade Centar =

- Interactive map of the Cascade Centar area

General information
- Status: Closed
- Type: Shopping mall
- Architectural style: Modern
- Location: Zagreb, Croatia
- Coordinates: 45.81938°N 15.97679°E
- Groundbreaking: 2006
- Completed: 2009

Technical details
- Floor count: 3
- Floor area: 12,319 square metres (132,600 sq ft)

Design and construction
- Architecture firm: Radionica arhitekture
- Structural engineer: Branko Galić

Other information
- Parking: 180 spaces

Cascade Centar was a shopping complex in Zagreb, Croatia. It was opened at the end of 2009 during the euro area crisis. By 2011 it was clear there were not enough shoppers to cover the high rents, and tenants began to move out. The center went bankrupt in 2012. It was closed and converted into a hotel in 2015.

== Structure ==
The mall is situated in the centre of Zagreb, about 500 metres (1,600 ft) north of the main city square, bounded by Tkalčićeva Street and Mikloušićeva Street. It was built on a 18,000 square metres (190,000 sq ft) lot leased from the Archdiocese of Zagreb for 99 years. The building covers 12,319 m^{2} (132,600 sq ft). It has three floors and an underground garage with 180 parking spaces. The shops were accessed from four "streets" or terraces, of which the upper two are covered by a translucent roof. The east part of the center contains four apartments overlooking the gardens of the residential street. These are completely separated from the commercial part of the building.

== Construction and operation ==
The project to build Cascade Centar was launched in August 2004. Radionica arhitekture was responsible for design, and Branko Galić undertook structural engineering. Interkonzalting provided consulting and design services. Construction was between 2006 and 2009. The original owner was the Molteh company, owned by former general Vladimir Zagorec. In 2007 Zagorec sold the company to the Czech-American group Ungelt / Spectrum. In 2010 the building was sold again to a group of investors.

The center opened at the end of 2009, during the euro area crisis. With stylish shops and cafés, it became a meeting place for the young urban elite. In 2010 the management in effect waived rents in an effort to attract tenants. Later there were many disputes between the tenants and the management over the high rent, lack of space and low numbers of visitors. Store owners complained that the management was demanding retroactive rent payments for 2010, and that when they decided to move out they were not allowed to remove their property. In October 2011 the management company said the center would be forced to close temporarily because tenants were failing to pay rent, and there was not enough revenue to cover the cost of services.

== Demise ==
Many fashion stores began to leave the center, which was closed early in the summer of 2012. The parking garage and a night club remained open. The company was in debt and was forced to file for bankruptcy. Starting with 2012, auctions of Cascade were repeatedly attempted, but no buyer was interested. The proceeds of the sale were to be divided among creditors, with the largest claimants being two Austrian banks. The complex was finally sold in February 2014, on the fifteenth auction. Estimated by the court in 2012 at almost 180 million kuna (US$26.5 million), it was sold for 22 million (US$3.2 million). Cascade Centar was closed in 2015 and the building structure was repurposed into a hotel.
