= Vladimir Zagorec =

Croatian general and deputy defense minister

- Born: 22 November 1963 (age 62); Zagreb, SR Croatia, Yugoslavia
- Occupations: General, politician, real estate developer
- Known for: Embezzlement, theft, abuse of office

Vladimir Zagorec (born 22 November 1963) is a former Croatian general and former deputy defense minister. In 2008 he was arrested in Austria and extradited to Croatia for trial on charges of embezzlement while he was responsible for state arms procurement during the Yugoslav Wars. He was sentenced to seven years in jail.

== Early career ==
Zagorec was born on 22 November 1963 in Zagreb, son of Rudolf Zagorec. He studied electrical engineering before starting a military career. On 4 August 1992 he was appointed lieutenant colonel. In 1993 he worked as chauffeur for Ivan Čermak, at that time Assistant Minister of Defense and chief logistician of the Croatian Army. Within a few months he had succeeded his boss in this position.

From 1994 to 2000 he was employed by the Croatian Ministry of Defence during the Yugoslav Wars. He was a confidant of the Croatian president Franjo Tuđman. He began buying equipment for the Croatian army. At that time the purchases of arms were clandestine due to a United Nations embargo, and no bills or receipts were prepared. He became head of the state-owned company Alan, which handled purchases of arms. Although he did not fight in the field, during his tenure he received many decorations and medals, more than any other general.

== Real estate ==
After Tudjman died and the HDZ was defeated in the 2000 elections Zagorec had to leave all his positions. Zagorec moved to Austria in 2000, where he became involved in property development. In February 2004 his young son Tomislav was kidnapped in Zagreb, but was released soon after. Zagorec's Molteh company was behind construction of the Cascade Centar, an upscale shopping mall in Zagreb that opened in 2009. In 2007 Zagorec sold the company to the Czech-American group Ungelt/Spectrum. In 2008 his estimated wealth was €26 million.

In March 2010 Zagorec was on trial for unlawfully renovating a summer house that belonged to Antun Šporer, the former vice-president of the Zagreb City Assembly. In December 2011 he was acquitted, although Antun Šporer was sentenced to 18 months in prison.

A scandal broke in 2010 when it was alleged that officers of the Austrian Hypo Alpe-Adria-Bank International had made unguaranteed loans ostensibly for real estate purchases in which large amounts had disappeared. Liechtenstein's authorities blocked six of Zagorec's bank accounts during the investigation into possible money-laundering. A trial began in March 2011. In October 2011 it was reported that the bank had recovered almost €60 million of loans it had advanced to Zagorec for Croatian real-estate development projects. €16.5 million was released from Liechtenstein banks accounts owned by Zagorec, and €43 million was returned by his Vienna-based Aktor real-estate company.

== Embezzlement conviction ==
In March 2007, Zagorec was arrested in Vienna on an international warrant issued by Croatia in which he was accused of embezzlement when he was responsible for arms procurement. He was accused of stealing over €3.25 million while deputy minister of defense. Zagorec was said to have received diamonds that he was to give to a weapons dealer as a deposit for an arms purchase, but that in fact he kept for himself. He fought a series of appeals up to the Supreme Court of Austria, but did not succeed. He was arrested on 26 September 2008 and held in custody prior to being extradited.

Zagorec was transferred to Zagreb in October 2008 for trial on charges of abuse of office and theft of jewels from the Defense ministry at the end of his term of office. The jewels were worth US$5 million. In March 2009 he was sentenced to seven years in jail by the Zagreb County Court. In November 2009 the Supreme Court upheld the sentence and stripped him of his rank and decorations. In September 2010, Croatian President Ivo Josipović confirmed that Zagorec and former generals Branimir Glavaš and Mirko Norac had been stripped of their army rank. In June 2013, Zagorec was given a conditional release from prison and allowed to visit his family in Austria.
