= Ivan Čermak =

Croatian businessman, politician and general

Assistant Minister of Defence
- In office 1991–1993
- President: Franjo Tuđman

Personal details
- Born: December 19, 1949 (age 76) Zagreb, PR Croatia, FPR Yugoslavia
- Party: Croatian Democratic Union
- Occupation: Businessman, politician, general

Military service
- Rank: Colonel General
- Battles/wars: Operation Storm

Ivan Čermak (ˈǐʋan ˈtʃɛrmaːk; born 19 December 1949) is a Croatian businessman, politician and former general.

== Biography ==
Born in Zagreb, Čermak became a small businessman in the 1980s. In the 1990s, he entered the oil business.

Between 1990 and 1991, Čermak held the position of Vice President of the Executive Board of the Croatian Democratic Union (HDZ) and also served as an advisor to the President of the Republic of Croatia, Franjo Tuđman. In 1991, he was appointed the Assistant Minister of Defence in the Croatian Government, a position he held until 1993. While in this position and thereafter, he held the rank of Colonel General. He was succeeded in this position by his former chauffeur, Vladimir Zagorec.

In 1993, he briefly served as the Minister of Economy in the Cabinet of Nikica Valentić.

Čermak was commander of the Croatian Army's Knin corps during the 1995 Operation Storm.

In 2000, he was one of the signatories to the Twelve Generals' Letter.

In February 2004, he was indicted by the International Criminal Tribunal for the former Yugoslavia and brought to Trial of Gotovina et al in the Hague on charges of operating a joint criminal enterprise for the purpose of permanently removing the Serb population from the Krajina by force and of crimes against humanity.

In April 2011 the judgement was handed down and he was acquitted of all charges by the Trial Chamber and released immediately. The Prosecution did not appeal his acquittal.
