= Svodna =

Svodna Сводна
- Village
- Location within Bosnia and Herzegovina
- Coordinates: 45°02′N 16°32′E
- Country: Bosnia and Herzegovina
- Entity: Republika Srpska
- Municipality: Novi Grad
- Time zone: UTC+1 (CET)
  - Summer (DST): UTC+2 (CEST)

Svodna (Cyrillic: Сводна) is a village in the municipality of Novi Grad, Republika Srpska, Bosnia and Herzegovina.

== Sport ==
There is a Football Stadium in the village, name “Braća Marčeta”. Football clubs in the village are FK “Svodna” and FK “7. Republika”.
