= Trial of Gotovina et al. =

ICTY war crimes trial decided in 2012

- Court: International Criminal Tribunal for the former Yugoslavia
- Full case name: Gotovina et al. (IT-06-90) "Operation Storm"
- Decided: 16 November 2012
- Transcript: ICTY case transcripts

Case history
- Related actions: Čermak & Markač (IT-03-73) "Operation Storm", Gotovina (IT-01-45)

Court membership
- Judges sitting: Trial chamber: Alphons Orie, Uldis Ķinis, Elisabeth Gwaunza; Appeals chamber: Theodor Meron, Mehmet Güney, Fausto Pocar, Patrick Lipton Robinson, Carmel Agius

Case opinions
- Separate opinion: Theodor Meron; Separate opinion: Patrick Lipton Robinson; Dissenting opinion: Carmel Agius; Dissenting opinion: Fausto Pocar

The Trial of Gotovina et al. was a war crimes trial held from March 2008 until (including the appeals process) November 2012 before the International Criminal Tribunal for the former Yugoslavia (ICTY), set up in 1993. The ICTY indicted Croatian Army (HV) generals Ante Gotovina, Ivan Čermak, and Mladen Markač for war crimes, specifically for their roles in Operation Storm, citing their participation in a joint criminal enterprise (JCE) aimed at the permanent removal of Serbs from the Republic of Serbian Krajina (RSK) held part of Croatia.

The ICTY charges specified that other participants in the JCE were President of Croatia Franjo Tuđman, defence minister Gojko Šušak, and generals Janko Bobetko and Zvonimir Červenko, however, all except Bobetko were dead before the first relevant ICTY indictment was issued in 2001. General Bobetko was indicted by the ICTY, but died a year later, before he could be transferred to the ICTY. The trial brought convictions of Gotovina and Markač and acquittal of Čermak in April 2011. Gotovina and Markač were acquitted on appeal in November 2012.

The case raised significant issues for law of war and it has been described as a precedent.

== Background ==
As the breakup of Yugoslavia progressed, the 1990 Log Revolution of the Croatian Serbs occurred, in parts of Lika, Kordun, Banovina, and in eastern Croatian settlements with significant Serb population. The areas were later named the Republic of Serbian Krajina (RSK), which declared intention of political integration with Serbia and was viewed by the Government of Croatia as a rebellion. By March 1991, the conflict escalated to war—the Croatian War of Independence. The final months of 1991 saw the fiercest fighting of the war, culminating in the Battle of the barracks, Siege of Dubrovnik, and the Battle of Vukovar.

In January 1992, the Sarajevo Agreement was signed by representatives of Croatia, the Yugoslav People's Army (JNA) and the United Nations (UN) to suspend fighting between the two sides. Ending the series of unsuccessful ceasefires, United Nations Protection Force (UNPROFOR) was deployed to Croatia—to supervise and maintain the agreement. The conflict largely passed on to entrenched positions, and the JNA soon retreated from Croatia into Bosnia and Herzegovina, where a new conflict was anticipated, but Serbia continued to support the RSK. Croatian Army (HV) advances restored small areas to Croatian control—as the siege of Dubrovnik was lifted, and in Operation Maslenica. Croatian towns and villages were intermittently attacked by artillery, or missiles.

=== Operation Storm ===
On 4 August 1995, Croatia launched the Operation Storm, recapturing bulk of the RSK-held territory within days in the largest European land battle since the World War II, encompassing a 320-kilometre (200 mi) frontline. It restored 10,400 square kilometres (4,000 square miles), representing 18.4% of the Croatia's territory, to Croatian control. Defeat of the RSK reversed the tide of Yugoslav Wars against the Serbs, giving the US diplomacy a strong boost. The success of the Operation Storm allowed Croatian and Bosnian leadership to plan a full-scale military intervention in Bosnian-Serb-held Banja Luka area of Bosnia and Herzegovina, aimed at creating a new balance of power there, a buffer zone along Croatian border, and contributing to resolution of the Bosnian War. The intervention would materialize as the Operation Mistral 2 of September 1995, albeit combined with a NATO air campaign in Bosnia and Herzegovina, contributing to start of peace talks that would result with the Dayton Agreement a few months later, as well as restoration to the remaining Serb-held areas in eastern Slavonia and Baranja to Croatia through the Erdut Agreement.

HV forces set to attack the RSK were organized in five army corps—Split, Gospić, Karlovac, Zagreb and Bjelovar Corps— with a zone assigned to the Croatian special police in between the Split and Gospić Corps zones. The special police zone was subordinated to the Split Corps. The HV Split Corps, located in the far south of the theatre of operations was commanded by Lieutenant General Ante Gotovina. The 3,100-strong special police, deployed to the Velebit Mountain on the left flank of the Split Corps, were commanded by the Colonel General Mladen Markač. On 5 August, General Ivan Čermak was appointed commander of the newly established HV Knin Corps after the town was captured by the HV.

During the Operation Storm, RSK authorities ordered evacuation of Knin, Glina and Vrginmost areas, and bulk of the Serb population left the area. A UN report indicated that more than 150,000 had fled to Yugoslavia, while 10–15 thousand arrived Banja Luka area. The number of Serb refugees is reported to be up to 200,000 by international media, and organizations. The retreating RSK military, transporting large quantities of weaponry and ammunition, artillery and tanks, and evacuating or fleeing civilians often intermingled, having few roads to use. The escaping columns were reportedly intermittently attacked by Croatian Air Force jets, HV artillery, and Army of the Republic of Bosnia and Herzegovina troops.

== Indictments ==
The ICTY issued indictments against three senior Croatian commanders, Colonel General Ivan Čermak, Colonel General Mladen Markač and Brigadier (later General) Ante Gotovina.

In the original indictment, the three were charged under individual, joint criminal enterprise and command responsibility for war crimes and crimes against humanity carried out against rebel Serb forces and civilians. The indictment alleged creation of a joint criminal enterprise whose purpose was to permanently remove the Serbian population through commission of crimes (plunder, inhumane treatment, murder, wanton destruction, looting and others) and prevention of their return. It was speculated that President Tuđman and his closest associates would have been indicted by the ICTY had they not died before the case was taken over by the court.

Čermak and Markač were handed over to the ICTY, but Gotovina fled. He was widely believed to be at liberty in Croatia or the Croat-inhabited parts of Bosnia, where many view him as a hero, and his continued freedom was attributed to covert help from — or at least a "blind eye" turned by — the Croatian authorities. The US Government offered a $5 million reward for the capture of Ante Gotovina and he became one of the ICTY's most wanted men. The issue was a major stumbling block for Croatia's international relations. Its application to join the European Union was rebuffed in March 2005 due to the Croatian government's perceived complicity in Gotovina's continued evasion of the ICTY.

On 8 December 2005, Gotovina was captured by Spanish police in a hotel on Tenerife in the Canary Islands. He was transferred to Madrid for court proceedings before extradition to the ICTY at The Hague. The ICTY later joined the proceedings against the three generals into a single case.

== Trial ==
The trial started in March 2008, and concluded in September 2010. In April 2011 the court found Ante Gotovina and Mladen Markač guilty, sentencing them to 24 and 18 years respectively while Ivan Čermak was acquitted of all charges.

Following a successful appeal, Ante Gotovina and Mladen Markač were acquitted of all charges by the Appeals Chamber in November 2012.

The transcript of the 31 July 1995 meeting, whose authenticity was verified by the Croatian Chief State Prosecutor's Office, formed the basis of the Prosecutor's allegation of a joint criminal enterprise found in the indictment against generals Ante Gotovina, Ivan Cermak and Mladen Markac. The prosecution of the ICTY alleged that the content of the meeting was evidence of existence of a joint criminal enterprise to forcibly remove the Serb population from Croatia, among other means by indiscriminately shelling civilian areas, and prevent their return. The Trial Chamber dismissed those allegations in part, arguing some of Tuđman's statements referred to the Serb military forces rather than civilians. More generally, the prosecution asserted that the transcripts demonstrated a shared intent to forcibly remove Serbs from the area and the Trial Chamber largely concurred, saying the intent of the meeting's participants was "to show Serbs out but at the same time give them the impression that they could stay". The Appeals Chamber focused on the lack of evidence in the transcript for the allegation of unlawful artillery attacks on four towns in the RSK which were meant to drive the population out.

It is important that these [Serb] civilians start moving and then the army will follow them, and when the columns start moving, they will have a psychological effect on each other.[...] That means we provide them with an exit, while on the other hand we feign to guarantee civilian human rights and the like...

— Croatian President Franjo Tuđman

In June 2008, during the trial, Canadian general Andrew Leslie claimed between 10,000 and 25,000 civilians were victims of the shelling of Knin on 4 and 5 August 1995. Mladen Markac's defense counsel cited this as an example of gross exaggerations of Serb casualties by the UN personnel in the field. Canadian general Alain Forand didn't want to comment on Leslie's claim, saying only that something like that was never registered in the situation reports drafted by the Sector South command.

The decision to launch Operation Storm is not controversial; what is controversial, however, is 'the successful effort' of some Croatian officials headed by President Franjo Tudjman to 'exploit the circumstances' and implement the plan to drive Serbs out of Krajina.

— ICTY prosecutor Alain Tieger about separating Operation Storm from war crimes done afterwards

The Trial Chamber's judgement had directly identified President Franjo Tuđman as part of a joint criminal enterprise dedicated to expelling Serb residents of the country's Krajina region. In it, however, the ICTY did not rule that Operation Storm as a whole was a "joint criminal enterprises" or that Croatia was established on an illegitimate basis. Rather the judges ruled that some aspects of the military offensive violated international law.

According to the Trial Chamber's findings, the population was already on the move due to the shelling of the towns before the Krajina authorities ordered evacuations. Later in August at least a further 20,000 people were the subject of deportation by way of forcible displacement due to crimes and inhumane acts. The Trial Chamber stated that "members of the Croatian military forces and the Special Police committed deportation as a crime against humanity of more than 20,000 Krajina Serbs" (par. 1710). However, the Appeals Chamber decided that civilian departures related to artillery attacks "only constituted deportation where these artillery attacks were found to have been unlawful" (par. 87), and in turn "reversed the Trial Chamber's findings related to unlawful artillery attacks" (par. 91) thus defeating charges of deportation entirely.

The Appeals Chamber decision was a 3-2 majority decision that found that the prosecution had failed to prove the existence of a joint criminal enterprise and the Trial Chamber failed to identify and discuss other modes of responsibility thus not allowing the Appeals Chamber to enter convictions under command responsibility or aiding and abetting.

== Aftermath ==
The first instance judgement was a shock to Croatia, and both Prime Minister Jadranka Kosor and President Ivo Josipović expressed their shock and rejection of the ruling, promising to help overturn the judgement on appeal. Serbian officials expressed their satisfaction with the judgement, some of them requesting that the Victory Day celebrations commemorating the Operation Storm in Croatia no longer be held. The judgement was seen by the public as helpful to further the Serbian case against Croatia regarding the Operation Storm. Response to the ruling, beyond Croatia and Serbia, was also divided. While some saw the decision as justice done for the victims, others saw the verdict as a politically inspired act meant to equalize blame between all sides in the war, representing a major coup for Serbia.

Subsequent acquittals of Gotovina and Markač led to jubilation in Croatia, and over a hundred thousand people gathered at the Zagreb's central square for a heroes' welcome after the Government of Croatia sent a plane to transfer the two back to the country, the same day the Appeals Chamber's judgement was rendered. They were welcomed by Prime Minister Zoran Milanović and other country's officials. President of Serbia Tomislav Nikolić called the judgement scandalous, political and illegal and predicted that it will not contribute to stability of the region and reopen "old wounds". In the aftermath of the judgement, Serbian officials declared that the ICTY had lost all its credibility, and decided to limit cooperation with the ICTY to formal correspondence only. Protests against the ruling drew several hundred in Belgrade.

The case raised significant issues for law of war, and became one of landmark cases tried by the ICTY shaping modern international law. The ruling is seen as a vindication of legality of the Operation Storm and of the 1990s Croatian leadership—as the Gotovina et al. case became a proxy trial of Tuđman, Šušak and Bobetko, and as a closure for the Croatian War of Independence, and a triumph of Croatia.
