= Begović =

Begović is a Bosnian surname, derived from the Ottoman Turkish word bey (beg in Bosnian) meaning "chieftain" or "lord". It is borne by ethnic Bosniaks, Serbs and Croats. Its literal meaning is "chieftain's son". It may refer to:

- Asmir Begović (b. 1987), Bosnian footballer
- Boris Begović (b. 1956), Serbian economist
- Ena Begović (1960–2000), Croatian actress
- Enes Begović (b. 1965), Bosnian singer-songwriter and producer
- Ivo Begović (b. 1993), Croatian water polo player
- Jelena Begović (b. 1970), Serbian molecular biologist
- Mia Begović (b. 1963), Croatian actress
- Milan Begović (1876–1948), Croatian writer
- Miljan Begović (b. 1964), Croatian figure skater
- Nenad Begović (b. 1980), Serbian footballer
- Nikola Begović (1821–1895), Serbian priest, religious teacher, poet and historian
- Vinko Begović (b. 1948), Croatian football coach

== Fictional ==
- Đuka Begović, protagonist in eponymous book by Ivan Kozarac and film by Branko Schmidt

== See also ==
- Begić
- Begovich, anglicized version
- Begovići
- Begović Kula
