= Only Unity Saves the Serbs =

Motto and slogan of Serbs

The Serbian cross, of which the firesteels were poetically interpreted as to rally Serbs, and also Yugoslavs, in the 19th century.

Only Unity Saves the Serbs (Serbian: Само Слога Србина Спасава, romanized: Samo Sloga Srbina Spasava, (Note: also spelled спашава (spašava)) commonly abbreviated as СССС, romanized: SSSS) is a popular motto and slogan in Serbia and among Serbs, often used as a rallying call during times of national crisis and against foreign domination. The phrase is an interpretation of what is taken to be four Cyrillic letters for "S" (written "С") on the Serbian cross. Popular mythology attributes the motto to Saint Sava, the founder and first Archbishop of the Serbian Orthodox Church, however, the true author is Jovan Dragašević (1836–1915), a Serbian military officer and writer.

The motto represents the "idea of betrayal", one of the main themes in the Kosovo Myth – the antithesis of Miloš Obilić's heroism embodied in the figure of Vuk Branković, who legend holds fled the battlefield, the moral of the story being that discord and betrayal among the Serbs had doomed the nation to fall into the hands of the Ottomans.

== History ==
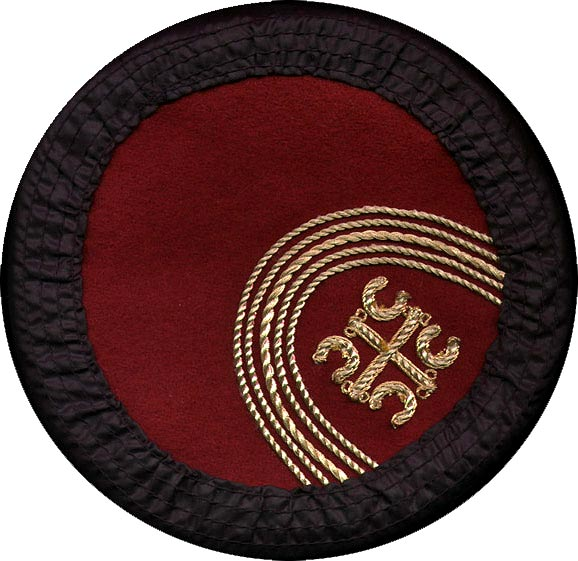
The four С acronym on the Montenegrin cap.

The popular poetic interpretation of the firesteels on the Serbian coat of arms as four Cyrillic С's dates to the 19th century. Jovan Sterija Popović in his 1847 dramatic historical allegory The Dream of Prince Marko (San Kraljevića Marka) was the first to state that the firesteels were to be read as four Cyrillic С's. The first interpretation was "Serbia Alone Saved Herself" (Sama Srbija sebe spasila). In 1854, the blind Bosnian Serb poet Jeremija Obradović Karadžić wrote verses such as "Only let unity be, then all is possible; in vain the enemy rises, where everything is in unity; united, thus, united all; he who goes against unity, is not worthy of the great Illyrian name". In the 1860 poem Echoes of Gusles (Jeka od gusala), Jovan Dragašević wrote "Only concord saves the Serb, so it is written for the Serb on the coat of arms" (Samo sloga Srbina spasava, tako Srbu piše i na grbu). Thus, Dragašević is the originator of the interpretation, popular to this day. According to B. Vankovska, the interpretation changed to "Only Unity Saves the Serbs" due to the growing national fear of internal enemies. Serbian poet and Orthodox priest Jovan Sundečić in the 1868 edition of Osvetnici, ili nevina žrtva used "Only Unity saves Slavdom" (Samo sloga Slavenstvo spašava). In the 1869 Poems and Traditions (Pesme i običai), a collection of poetry and traditions collected by Miloš S. Milojević, he comments on various interpretations (Srbin srbu srbski srbovati/Samo sloga Srbina spasava/Samosvest samo Srbina spasava/Samo svetlost Srbu je svojstvena). Nikola Begović described the national coat of arms as saying "Only Unity Saves the Serb", while the church coat of arms said "Serb, remember your glory" in his 1877 work; he also recorded the motto "Only Unity Saves the Serb" in Lika and Banija and included it in his 1885 work. In 1879, Austrian Serb priest and poet Bogoljub Petranović published a poem in the Slovinac magazine (in Dubrovnik), which begins with "Only Unity Saves All"; he had written it during the Serbian-Ottoman Wars. Croatian Serb poet Dušan Rogić had the verse "Only unity leads Serbdom to real happiness and freedom" in his poetry collection (1879). In the 1881 publication of the Srbadija magazine, it was mentioned that the popular interpretation, which "pious patriotic souls have already took for sure", was Only Unity Saves the Serbs. The editorship of Učitelj ("The Teacher") wrote a piece in 1884 criticizing Serbian politics for disunity, including "and that saying Only Unity Saves the Serb could be better reversed and said Only Disunity Destroys the Serb". Austro-Hungarian Serb Stevan V. Popović (1845–1918) used "Only Unity Saves the Serb" in his speech at the national-church assembly held on 12 November 1892. The Montenegrin poet Milo Jovović (1866–1916) published his 1896 poem Samo sloga Srbina spasava in the Bosanska vila magazine.

The association of the motto "Only Unity Saves the Serbs" with Saint Sava originates with the 1882 poem The Death of Saint Sava (Smrt svetog Save) by Milorad Šimić, in which Saint Sava urges the Serbs to declare national autonomy and resist domination by the Roman Catholic Church. The phrase is found in written on towels and engraved on gusle dating to the 1880s and 1890s. Russian writer Vera Zhelikhovskaya (1835–1896) wrote in her 1897 book, in the chapter on Serbia, that she was joyful that the motto was inscribed on the coat of arms. In the introduction of Vladan Đorđević's Emperor Stefan Dušan: Young king (Car Dušan: Mladi kralj, 1919), in the Yugoslavist spirit, he writes "Because only unity saves, not only the Serb, but the Croat and Slovene, Orthodox, Catholics and Muslims". A popular embroidery on the Montenegrin cap following the 1918 unification was the Serbian cross (with the popular interpretation "Only Unity Saves the Serbs"), to signify Serb unification and national identity. The phrase was used in songs of the Pan-Slavist Serbian Sokol movement.

During World War II, the Main Staff of Chetnik Detachments in Croatian-occupied Bosnia and Herzegovina used it as an appeal in their struggle.

== Contemporary use ==
The СССС acronym began appearing in Serbian nationalist graffiti during the 1980s. In 1989, Serbian President Slobodan Milošević delivered his infamous Gazimestan speech before a large, stone Serbian cross bearing the СССС acronym. In the early 1990s, as Yugoslavia began to disintegrate, Milošević's propaganda apparatus adopted the phrase.

The СССС acronym form of the phrase was featured with the Serbian cross on the insignia of the Serbian Army of Krajina during the Croatian War of Independence and on the insignia of the Army of Republika Srpska during the Bosnian War. The Serbian cross with the СССС acronym was also used as a wing and fuselage marking on aircraft used by the Republika Srpska Air Force. The phrase was often scrawled on the walls of abandoned houses in towns captured by Serb forces, usually followed alongside the acronym JNA (for Yugoslav People's Army) and the names of individual soldiers. In the immediate aftermath of the Yugoslav Wars, license plates throughout Republika Srpska featured the acronym. These were replaced several years later, following the introduction of nationwide license plates.

Serbian singer-songwriter Bora Đorđević adapted the motto as the title to his song Samo sloga Srbina spasava, written during the 1999 NATO bombing of Yugoslavia.

In 2010, on the anniversary of the Battle of Loznica, Patriarch Irinej said that "only unity could save the Serb people, and nonunity could ruin it".

In 2013, Slovene politician and EP member Jelko Kacin congratulated that Kosovo Serb representatives had united despite political differences, in a delegation to the EP, with the words "Bravo, Serbs, only unity saves the Serbs".

An international conference of Serbian Orthodox youth with the name "Only unity saves Serbs" was held in 2015 and 2016 in Republika Srpska.

It is traditionally written in acronym form on a česnica, a type of Serbian Christmas bread, as well as in Easter egg decorating.

== See also ==
- List of Serbian mottos
- National symbols of Serbia
- Unity makes strength
