= 18th Western Slavonian Corps =

Serb Krajina army unit

18. Western Slavonian Corps; 18. западнославонски корпус; 18. zapadnoslavonski korpus
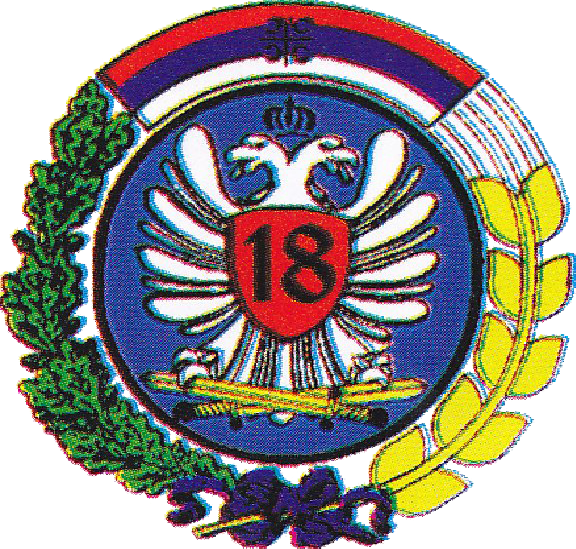
- Active: 1992–1995
- Disbanded: 1995
- Country: Serbian Krajina
- Branch: Serbian Army of Krajina
- Size: c. 4,500
- Garrison/HQ: Okučani (1992 to April 1995); Stara Gradiška
- Engagements: Yugoslav Wars; Croatian War of Independence; Operation Flash

Commanders
- Commander 1: Colonel Lazo Babić
- Commander 2: Major General Milan Čeleketić

The 18th Western Slavonian Corps was a military unit of the Serbian Army of Krajina commanded by Lazo Babić and Milan Čeleketić, whom was appointed Main Staff of the Serbian Army of Krajina after the previous incumbent Mile Novaković resigned in 1994. Čeleketić left his position after the defeat during Operation Flash.

The SAO Western Slavonia Territorial Defense and Okučani Brigade had been destroyed by the Croatian Army in 1991–92, remnants of the brigade merged into the 18th Slavonian Corps, this included form members of the Yugoslav People's Army. The 18th Western Slavonian Corps was composed of seven infantry and artillery battalions.

The 18th Western Slavonia Corps area of responsibility was Okučani including all of Western Slavonia. The SVK had 3,500-4,000 defending the area. During Operation Flash, the victory was crucial for the defense of Western Slavonia, the Corps, lacking in the ability to fight and were numerically weaker.

On May 3, the Serbian Army of Krajina’s main command reached for a Ceasefire. It was Lazo Babić who gave the order to Stevo Harambašić to surrender 7,000 Soldiers and civilians to Argentine United Nations Protection Force personnel. The Chief of the Police in Pakrac, Nikola Ivkanec accepted the offer.

== Organization ==
In Western Slavonia Corps comprised three light infantry brigades, mixed artillery and an armored division, all of which were garrisoned in Okučani until it was moved in April 1995. The unit had around 4,500 men at disposal a quota of the 8,000 the brigade was supposed to have. It consisted of seven units:

- 98th Light Infantry Brigade
- 51st Light Infantry Brigade
- 54th Light Infantry Brigade
- 59th Brigade
- 63rd Brigade
- 91st Rear guard
- 18th Artillery regiment
- Tactical Group 1 (TG 1)

== Operation Flash ==
Operation Flash from May 1 to May 3, 1995, aimed at recapturing territory held by the Army of the Republic of Serb Krajina in Western Slavonia. The offensive that led to the liberation of important towns such as Okučani and the surrounding areas It quick due to the deployment of heavily armored units and effective air support, which resulted in a quick advance and victory of the Croatian Army with relatively low casualties.

As a result, the military situation had become unfavorable, Milan Čeleketić resigned after the massive losses and failure to defend Western Slavonia, the ranks of the 18th Western Slavonian Corps collapsed due to high losses and low morale in 1995.

== See also ==
- 105th Aviation Brigade
