= Operation Flash =

Croatian Army offensive during the Croatian War of Independence

Coordinates: 45.26°N 17.2°E

- Part of the Croatian War of Independence
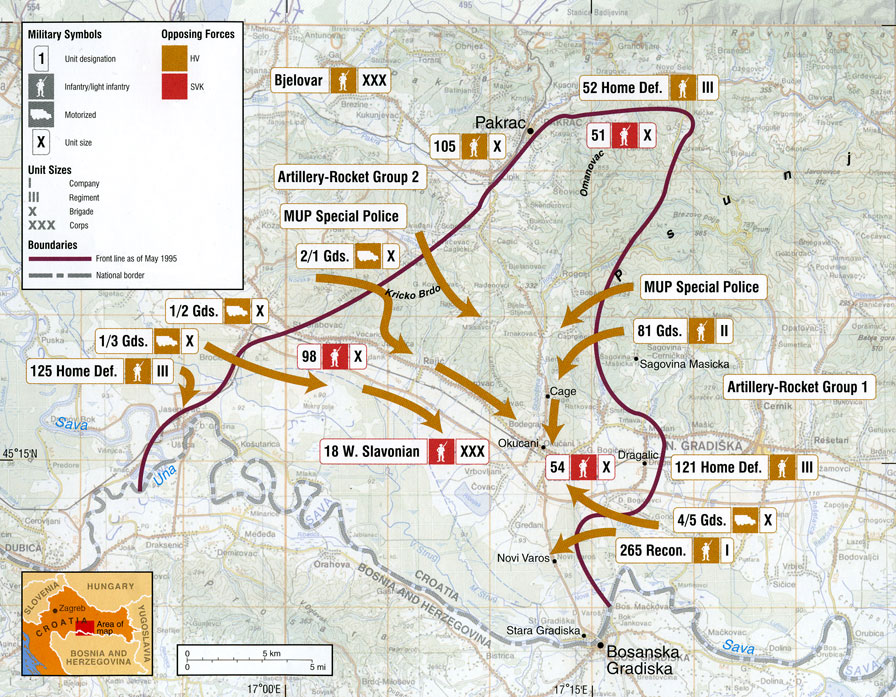
- Map of Operation Flash
Date	1–3 May 1995
Location	Western Slavonia, Croatia
Result	Croatian strategic victory
Territorial changes	Croatia secured 558 km^{2} (215 sq mi) of its territory.

Belligerents
Croatia	Republic of Serbian Krajina	UNPROFOR: Argentina; Nepal; Jordan

Commanders and leaders
(Croatia) Janko Bobetko (Croatia) Zvonimir Červenko (Croatia) Luka Džanko (Croatia) Petar Stipetić	(Republic of Serbian Krajina) Milan Čeleketić (Republic of Serbian Krajina) Lazo Babić	(Argentina) Carlos Matalón

Strength
7,200	4,000	

Casualties and losses
42 killed 162 wounded 1 MiG-21 shot down	188–283 killed (military and civilians); 1,200 wounded 2,100 captured	11,500–15,000 Croatian Serb refugees 3 UN peacekeepers wounded

Operation Flash (Croatian: Operacija Bljesak) was a brief Croatian Army (HV) offensive conducted against the forces of the self-declared proto-state Republic of Serbian Krajina (RSK) from 1–3 May 1995. The offensive occurred in the later stages of the Croatian War of Independence and was the first major confrontation after ceasefire and economic cooperation agreements were signed between Croatia and the RSK in 1994. The last organised RSK resistance formally ceased on 3 May, with the majority of troops surrendering the next day near Pakrac, although mop-up operations continued for another two weeks.

Operation Flash was a strategic victory for Croatia resulting in the capture of a 558-square-kilometre (215 sq mi) salient held by RSK forces centred in and around the town of Okučani. The town, which sat astride the Zagreb–Belgrade motorway and railroad, had presented Croatia with significant transport problems between the nation's capital Zagreb and the eastern region of Slavonia as well as between non-contiguous territories held by the RSK. The area was a part of United Nations Confidence Restoration Operation (UNCRO) Sector West under the United Nations Security Council peacekeeping mandate in Croatia. The attacking force consisted of 7,200 HV troops, supported by the Croatian special police, arrayed against approximately 3,500 RSK soldiers. In response to the operation, the RSK military bombarded Zagreb and other civilian centres, causing seven fatalities and injuries to 205.

Forty-two HV soldiers and Croatian policemen were killed in the operation and 162 wounded. RSK casualties are disputed—Croatian authorities cited the deaths of 188 Serb soldiers and civilians with an estimated 1,000–1,200 wounded. Serbian sources, on the other hand, claimed that 283 Serb civilians were killed, contrary to the 83 reported by the Croatian Helsinki Committee. It is estimated that out of 14,000 Serbs living in the region, two-thirds fled immediately with more following in subsequent weeks. By the end of June, it is estimated that only 1,500 Serbs remained. Subsequently, the personal representative of the Secretary-General of the United Nations Yasushi Akashi criticised Croatia for "mass violations" of human rights, but his statements were refuted by the Human Rights Watch and to some extent by the United Nations Commission on Human Rights rapporteur Tadeusz Mazowiecki.

== Background ==
RSK areas captured by Croatia in Operation Flash RSK areas left after Operation Flash Zagreb–Belgrade motorway other roads 1 - Okučani, 2 - Novska, 3 - Nova Gradiška, 4 - Pakrac, 5 - Lipik, 6 - Stara Gradiška, 7 - Novi Varoš, 8 - Dragalić, 9 - Cage, 10 - Bijela Stijena, 11 - Rajić, 12 - Jasenovac, 13 - Bročice, 14 - Draksenić, 15 - Gradiška, 16 - Cernik

The 1990 revolt of the Croatian Serbs was centred on the predominantly Serb-populated areas of the Dalmatian hinterland around Knin, parts of the Lika, Kordun, Banovina regions and in eastern Croatian settlements with significant Serb populations, as well as parts of western Slavonia centred on Pakrac and Okučani. In the early stages of the Log Revolution, tens of thousands of Serbs fled Croatian-controlled cities, to form the entity known as the Republic of Serbian Krajina (RSK). The RSK's proclaimed intention to integrate politically with Serbia was viewed by the Croatian Government as an act of rebellion. By March 1991, the conflict had escalated to war: the Croatian War of Independence. In June 1991, with the breakup of Yugoslavia, Croatia declared its independence, which came into effect on 8 October after a three-month moratorium. From late October to late December 1991, Croatian forces conducted Operations Otkos 10 and Orkan 91, recapturing 60% of RSK-occupied western Slavonia. This resulted in Serbs fleeing from the area, while some were killed in a death camp in Pakračka Poljana. A campaign of ethnic cleansing was then initiated by the RSK against Croatian civilians and most non-Serbs were expelled by early 1993. After the end of the war, thousands of civilians murdered by the Serb troops were exhumed from mass graves.

As the Yugoslav People's Army (JNA) increasingly supported the RSK and the Croatian Police was unable to cope with the situation, the Croatian National Guard (ZNG) was formed in May 1991. The ZNG was renamed the Croatian Army (HV) in November. The establishment of the military of Croatia was hampered by a United Nations (UN) arms embargo introduced in September. The final months of 1991 saw the fiercest fighting of the war, culminating in the Battle of the barracks, the Siege of Dubrovnik, and the Battle of Vukovar. The western Slavonia area became the scene of a JNA offensive in September and October aimed at severing all transport links between the Croatian capital, Zagreb, and Slavonia. Even though the HV managed to reclaim much territory gained by the JNA advance in operations Otkos 10 and Orkan 91, it failed to secure the Zagreb–Belgrade motorway and railroad significant for the defence of Slavonia.

In January 1992, the Sarajevo Agreement was signed by representatives of Croatia, the JNA and the UN, and fighting between the two sides was paused. Ending the series of unsuccessful ceasefires, United Nations Protection Force (UNPROFOR) was deployed to Croatia to supervise and maintain the agreement. The conflict largely passed on to entrenched positions and the JNA soon retreated from Croatia into Bosnia and Herzegovina, where a new conflict was anticipated, but Serbia continued to support the RSK. HV advances restored small areas to Croatian control through Operation Maslenica and as the siege of Dubrovnik was lifted. Croatian towns and villages were intermittently attacked by artillery, or missiles. Cities in the RSK were also fired on by Croatian forces. The Republika Srpska, Serb-held territory in Bosnia and Herzegovina, was involved in the war in a limited capacity, through military and other aid to the RSK, occasional air raids launched from Banja Luka, and most significantly through artillery attacks against several cities. The HV deployed to Bosnia and Herzegovina, especially in a campaign against the Bosnian Serbs. The intervention was formalized on 22 July 1995, when Croatian President Franjo Tuđman and the Bosnian president, Alija Izetbegović, signed Split Agreement on mutual defence, permitting the large-scale deployment of the HV in Bosnia and Herzegovina, that drove back Bosnian Serb forces and came within striking distance of Banja Luka.

== Prelude ==
The March 1994 Washington Agreement, ended the Croat–Bosniak War and created conditions for provision of US military aid to Croatia. Croatia requested US military advisors from the Military Professional Resources Incorporated (MPRI) to provide training of civil-military relations, programme and budget services of the HV the same month, and the MPRI training was licensed by the US Department of State upon endorsement from Richard Holbrooke in August. The MPRI was hired because the UN arms embargo was still in place, ostensibly to prepare the HV for NATO Partnership for Peace programme participation. They trained HV officers and personnel for 14 weeks from January to April 1995. It was also speculated that the MPRI also provided doctrinal advice, scenario planning and US government satellite information to Croatia. MPRI and Croatian officials dismissed such speculation. In November 1994, the United States unilaterally ended the arms embargo against Bosnia and Herzegovina, in effect allowing the HV to supply itself as 30% of arms and ammunition shipped through Croatia was kept as a trans-shipment fee. The US involvement reflected a new military strategy endorsed by Bill Clinton since February 1993.

In 1994, the United States, Russia, the European Union (EU) and the UN sought to replace the 1992 peace plan drafted by Cyrus Vance, Special Envoy of the UN Secretary-General, which brought in the UNPROFOR. They formulated the Z-4 plan giving Serb-majority areas in Croatia substantial autonomy. After numerous and often uncoordinated development of the plan, including leaking of its draft elements to the press in October, the Z-4 plan was presented on 30 January 1995. Neither Croatia nor the RSK liked the plan. Croatia was concerned that the RSK might accept it, but Croatian President Franjo Tuđman realised that Slobodan Milošević, who would ultimately make the decision for the RSK, would not accept the plan for fear that it would set a precedent for a political settlement in Kosovo—allowing Croatia to accept the plan with little possibility for it to be implemented. The RSK refused to receive, let alone accept the plan.

In December 1994, Croatia and the RSK made an economic agreement to restore road and rail links, water and gas supplies and use of a part of the Adria oil pipeline. Even though a part of the agreement was never implemented, the pipeline and a 23.2-kilometre (14.4 mi) section of the Zagreb–Belgrade motorway passing through RSK territory around Okučani were opened, shortening travel from the capital to Slavonia by several hours. Since its opening, the motorway section became of strategic importance both to Croatia and the RSK in further negotiations. The section was closed by the RSK for 24 hours on 24 April, in response to increased control of commercial traffic leaving the RSK held territory in the eastern Slavonia—likely increasing Croatian resolve to capture the area through military action. The controls were put in place by the United Nations Security Council Resolution 981 of 31 March 1995, establishing the United Nations Confidence Restoration Operation (UNCRO) peacekeeping force instead of UNPROFOR, and tasked the force with monitoring of Croatian international borders separating the RSK-held territory from Yugoslavia or Bosnia and Herzegovina, as well as facilitating the latest Croatia–RSK ceasefire of 29 March 1994, and the December 1994 economic agreement.

The situation worsened again on 28 April, when a Serb was stabbed by a Croat refugee—both of them living in the same village before 1991—at a filling station adjacent to the motorway, situated in Croatian controlled territory near Nova Gradiška. In response, a group of Serbs, including a brother of the killed man, fired on vehicles on the motorway which remained open despite a UNCRO request to Croatia to close the route. Three civilians were killed in the shooting and RSK soldiers arrested five. The shooting stopped by 1:00 a.m., and the five were released in the morning and the UNCRO demanded that the motorway be reopened. The RSK 18th Corps and the chief of police in Okučani declined on instructions from the RSK leadership in Knin, but later agreed to reopen the road on 1 May at 6:00 a.m. However, the decision to reopen the motorway was cancelled on 30 April at 8:00 p.m. The same night, three rocket-propelled grenades were fired into the Croatian-controlled part of Pakrac and a vehicle was attacked on the Pakrac–Požega road located close to RSK positions, the latter resulting in one dead and one captured civilian. Hrvoje Šarinić, an advisor to Tuđman, confirmed that Croatia contemplated staging an incident which would provoke a military capture of the motorway area, but he also denied that one was needed as incidents were known to occur on a regular basis.

== Order of battle ==
The HV General Staff developed a plan to capture the RSK-held area of western Slavonia in December 1994. The forces were set to converge on Okučani, advancing east from Novska and west from Nova Gradiška, isolating RSK forces remaining north of the line while they are pinned down by reserve infantry brigades and Home Guard regiments. A part of the main force would secure the area south of the main axis of the attack, reaching the Sava River in order to prevent any reinforcements sent by the Army of Republika Srpska (VRS) from reaching the area. The plan included Croatian Air Force (CAF) air strikes on the only Sava River bridge in the area, located between Stara Gradiška and Gradiška. In the second phase of the offensive, a mop-up operation was designed to eliminate any pockets of resistance left over. The HV General Staff and the HV Bjelovar Corps performed a full-scale staff and field rehearsal for Operation Flash in February. The operation was directed by the Bjelovar Corps commanded by Brigadier Luka Džanko, although the HV General Staff set up three forward command posts to allow rapid reaction by Lieutenant General Zvonimir Červenko. The primary posts were in Novska and Nova Gradiška, under control of Major General Ivan Basarac and Lieutenant General Petar Stipetić respectively. At the time, Červenko was acting chief of the General Staff as General Janko Bobetko was hospitalized in Zagreb.

Croatia deployed 7,200 troops to conduct the attack, including elements of three guards brigades and an independent guards battalion supported by special forces of the Croatian Police and reserve HV and Home Guard troops. The 18th West Slavonian Corps of the RSK, defending the area, was expected to have 4,773 troops at its disposal, as it ordered mobilization of the troops on 28–29 April. The move brought the 18th Corps, commanded by Colonel Lazo Babić, to strength of about 4,500 troops. An RSK commission set up to evaluate the battle claimed that some of the RSK units were not able to retrieve antitank weapons from UNCRO depots in Stara Gradiška and near Pakrac until after the offensive began. The weapons were stored there pursuant to the March 1994 ceasefire agreement. Nonetheless, the UNCRO did not resist the RSK troops removing the stored weapons.

Initial Croatian Army deployments in Operation Flash
Corps	Unit	Note
Bjelovar Corps	elements of the 1st Croatian Guards Brigade	In Novska area
Bjelovar Corps	2nd Battalion of the 1st Guards Brigade	In Novska area
Bjelovar Corps	1st Battalion of the 3rd Guards Brigade	In Novska area
Bjelovar Corps	125th Home Guard Regiment	In Novska area
Bjelovar Corps	Special police (1 battalion size)	In Novska area
Bjelovar Corps	1 artillery rocket battalion of the 2nd Guards Brigade	In Novska area
Bjelovar Corps	1 artillery rocket battalion of the 3rd Guards Brigade	In Novska area
Bjelovar Corps	2nd Battalion of the 16th Artillery Rocket Brigade	In Novska area
Bjelovar Corps	4th Battalion of the 5th Guards Brigade	In Nova Gradiška area
Bjelovar Corps	81st Guards Battalion	In Nova Gradiška area
Bjelovar Corps	121st Home Guard Regiment	In Nova Gradiška area
Bjelovar Corps	265th Reconnaissance Sabotage Company	In Nova Gradiška area
Bjelovar Corps	1 armoured company of the 123rd Infantry Brigade	In Nova Gradiška area
Bjelovar Corps	Special police (1 battalion size)	In Nova Gradiška area
Bjelovar Corps	1st Battalion of the 16th Artillery Rocket Brigade	In Nova Gradiška area
Bjelovar Corps	18th Artillery Battalion	In Nova Gradiška area
Bjelovar Corps	52nd Infantry Brigade	In Pakrac area
Bjelovar Corps	105th Infantry Brigade	In Pakrac area
Bjelovar Corps	Special police (1 battalion size)	In Pakrac area
Bjelovar Corps	15th Artillery Rocket Brigade	Corps-level support

Initial RSK military deployments in Operation Flash
Corps	Unit	Note
18th Western Slavonian Corps	98th Infantry Brigade	In Novska area
18th Western Slavonian Corps	54th Infantry Brigade	In Okučani area, opposite Nova Gradiška
18th Western Slavonian Corps	51st Infantry Brigade	In Pakrac area
18th Western Slavonian Corps	59th Infantry Detachment	In Pakrac area
18th Western Slavonian Corps	63rd Infantry Detachment	In Pakrac area
18th Western Slavonian Corps	Special police battalion	In Pakrac area
18th Western Slavonian Corps	Tactical group 1	In Jasenovac area
18th Western Slavonian Corps	4 batteries of supporting artillery	In part located south of the Sava river, in the Republika Srpska

== Timeline ==
=== 1 May ===
On 1 May 1995, Šarinić informed UNCRO of the imminent HV offensive in a telephone call to the Canadian general Raymond Crabbe at 4:00 a.m. designed to let the UNCRO troops seek shelter in time. Operation Flash started through an artillery preparatory bombardment of RSK held positions at 4:30 a.m. Infantry and armour attacks converging from Novska, Nova Gradiška and Pakrac at Okučani and an attack from Novska towards Jasenovac commenced at various times between 5:30 and 7:00 a.m. The artillery and CAF strikes caused panic in the RSK rear, but did not take out the Sava River bridge in Stara Gradiška. Bobetko was concerned about the RSK tanks located in the town as a possible counter-attack force and requested that the CAF use its Mil Mi-24s to prevent the RSK armour from intervening.

At 5:30 am, Croatian special police moved through a gap in the RSK defences, between the 98th Infantry Brigade facing Novska and the Tactical Group 1 (TG1) defending Jasenovac, disrupting the integrity of RSK positions, and outflanking the 98th Brigade on the Novska–Okučani axis of the HV attack, where a battalion of the 1st Guards advanced along a secondary road parallel to the motorway, while one battalion from the 2nd Guards and the 3rd Guards Brigades each advanced east on the motorway itself, crushing the RSK defence. At 1:00 p.m., the commanding officer of the RSK 98th Infantry Brigade left the unit and reported to the Corps commander that the brigade was in disarray, citing heavy losses. The HV attack aimed at capturing Jasenovac was a two-pronged advance of the 125th Home Guard Regiment supported by the special police south and east from Bročice and Drenov Bok. The TG1 offered no significant resistance, and the HV captured Jasenovac between noon and 1:00 p.m.., the RSK authorities in Okučani permitted the evacuation of civilians; however, the civilians were quickly joined by retreating elements of the 98th and the 54th Brigades. The TG1 retreated south across the Sava River. After capture of Jasenovac, the HV 125th Home Guards Regiment and the special police advanced eastward along the Sava River.

On the Nova Gradiška–Okučani axis, the RSK 54th Infantry Brigade held positions east of Okučani, facing the 4th Battalion of the 5th Guards Brigade, the 81st Guards Battalion, an armoured company of the 123rd Brigade and the 121st Home Guard Regiment of the HV. Due to a breakdown in the chain of command, the HV attack was delayed, forcing the 81st Guards Battalion to face well prepared defenders in Dragalić. Stipetić, who toured the front line personally, reported that the delay was up to two and a half hours. In response, the HV redirected the 4th Battalion of the 5th Guards Brigade, the 265th Reconnaissance Sabotage Company and the armoured company of the 123rd Brigade to dislodge the RSK troops. The RSK 54th Infantry Brigade put up strong resistance until 9:00 a.m., when its commander ordered a retreat. Still, the HV force captured the village of Bijela Stijena on the Okučani–Pakrac road and encircled Okučani by 11:00 p.m. on 1 May, before suspending its advance for the night. The capture of Bijela Stijena effectively isolated the RSK 51st Infantry Brigade, the 59th and the 63rd Detachments and the RSK Special police battalion, as well as the 1st Battalion of the 54th Infantry Brigade and the 2nd Battalion of the 98th Infantry Brigade north of Okučani. Furthermore, the RSK force near Pakrac could not communicate with the Corps command because their communication system failed. In the Pakrac area, the HV deployed the 105th Infantry Brigade and the 52nd Home Guard Regiment. It was estimated that the RSK forces there were well entrenched and that the HV chose to envelop and pin them down rather than engage in any large-scale combat.

=== 2 May ===
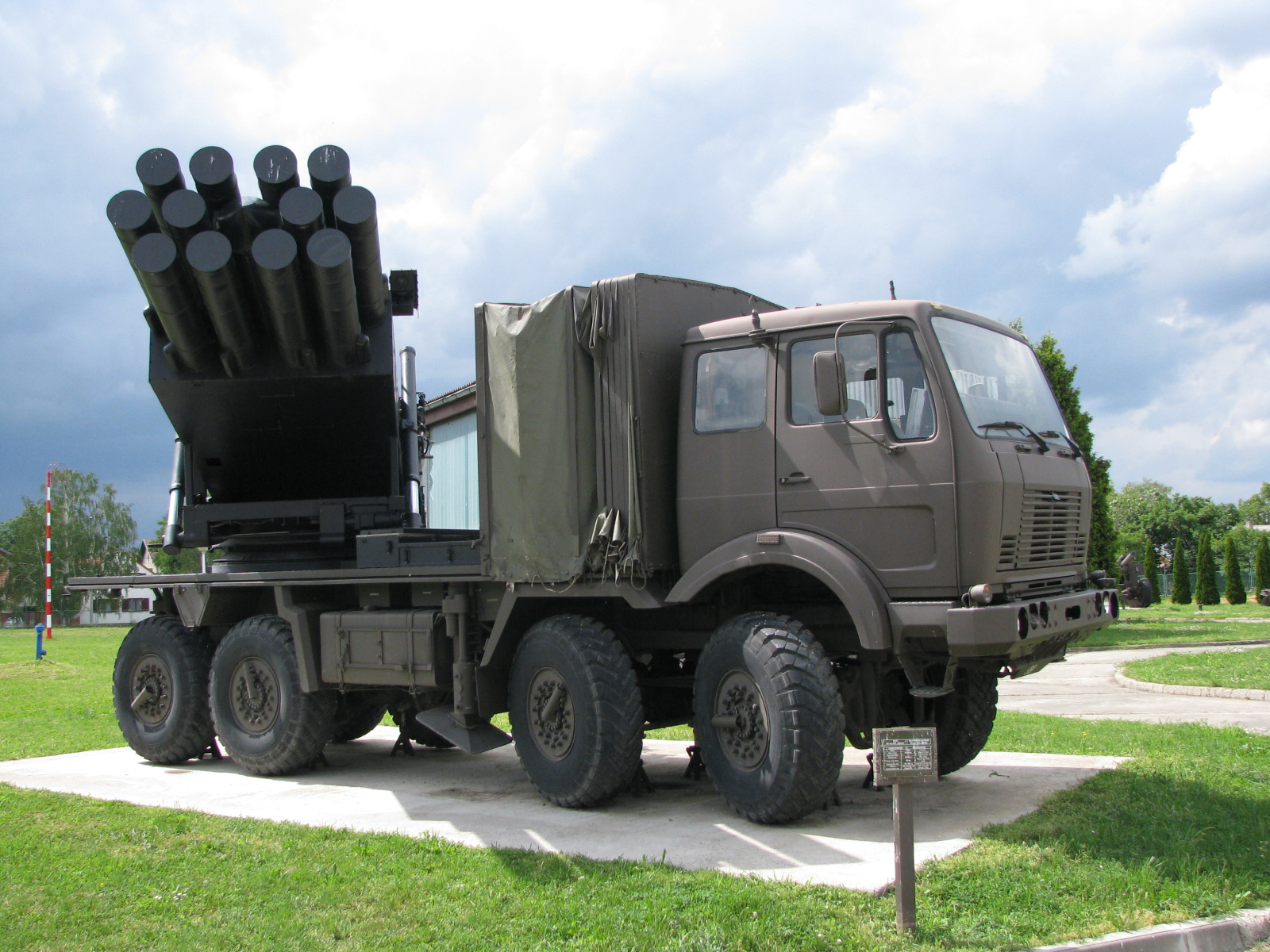
An example of the M-87 Orkan rocket launcher used in the 2–3 May Zagreb attacks

The HV resumed its advance in the early morning of 2 May. The retreating elements of the RSK 98th and 54th Infantry Brigades mixed with civilians evacuating south towards the Republika Srpska clashed with the 265th Reconnaissance Sabotage Company near Novi Varoš, but managed to continue south. The RSK 18th Corps moved its headquarters from Stara Gradiška across the Sava River to Gradiška in Republika Srpska against the orders of General Milan Čeleketić, the chief of the RSK General Staff. The HV captured Okučani at 1:00 p.m. as the HV pincers advancing from Novska and Nova Gradiška met. At about the same time, the command of the RSK 54th Infantry Brigade arrived to Stara Gradiška having evacuated from Okučani, and ordered an artillery strike on Nova Gradiška in retaliation. Even though a token support of 195 RSK troops arrived to the area from eastern Slavonia, they refused to fight upon learning of the developments on the battleground.

The RSK 18th Corps requests for close air support were denied by the political leadership of the Republika Srpska as well as the RSK Main Staff. They thought that the HV might attack other RSK-held areas and because of the NATO Operation Deny Flight—enforcing a no-fly zone over Bosnia and Herzegovina which would have to be overflown to assist the 18th Corps. The RSK deployed only two helicopters to support the corps, but they could not be directed against the HV because of the communication system failure. In contrast, the CAF attacked RSK positions near Stara Gradiška, specifically the bridge spanning the Sava River there. In one such sortie, the air defence of the Republika Srpska shot down a CAF MiG-21 flown by Rudolf Perešin (who had defected to Austria in 1991) at 1:00 p.m. on 2 May, killing him.

The RSK leadership decided to retaliate against Croatia by ordering the artillery bombardment of Croatian urban centres. On 2 May, the RSK military attacked Zagreb and Zagreb Airport using eleven M-87 Orkan rockets carrying cluster munitions. The attack was repeated the next day. Six civilians were killed and 205 injured in the two attacks, while a policeman was killed defusing one of 500 unexploded bomblets. United States ambassador to Croatia, Peter Galbraith called the attack a declaration of an all-out war.

=== 3 May ===
On 3 May, Croatia and the RSK reached an agreement, mediated by the personal representative of the Secretary-General of the United Nations Yasushi Akashi, to end hostilities by 4:00 p.m. later that day. Consequently, the RSK General Staff instructed the 18th Western Slavonian Corps to cease fire at 3:00 p.m. Babić in turn ordered Lieutenant Colonel Stevo Harambašić, the commanding officer of the RSK 51st Infantry Division to surrender 7,000 troops and civilians encircled by the HV south of Pakrac to the Argentine UNCRO battalion—as agreed by with the Croatian authorities. Harambašić and about 600 troops surrendered on 3 May, while many more remained in the Psunj mountain east and southeast of Pakrac. The surrender was accepted by Pakrac chief of police, Nikola Ivkanec.

=== 4 May and beyond ===
As hundreds of RSK troops refused to surrender, remaining in the Psunj forests, Bobetko appointed Stipetić to conduct mop-up operations against those troops. The HV used artillery attacks to flush approximately 1,500 RSK troops towards its positions and captured them by the end of the day. Nonetheless, the HV and the Croatian special police continued to sweep the area for any remaining RSK military personnel. One such group of about 50 soldiers of the RSK 2nd Battalion of the 98th Infantry Brigade swam across the Sava River into the Republika Srpska on 7 May. The mop-up operations were completed by 20 May, when the last remaining RSK troops surrendered to the Croatian police on Psunj.

== Aftermath ==
RSK areas captured by Croatia in Operation Flash
RSK areas left after Operation Flash

Operation Flash was a strategic victory for Croatia. It captured 558-square-kilometre (215 sq mi) area formerly held by the RSK, and placed the entire western Slavonia region under Croatian government control and secured the use of strategically important road and rail links between the capital and the east of the country. Croatian military losses in the offensive were 42 killed and 162 wounded. Croatia initially estimated that the RSK military sustained 350–450 killed and 1,000–1,200 wounded. The number of killed in action was later revised to 188. This figure included military and civilian deaths. On 3–4 May, the HV and the Croatian special police took approximately 2,100 prisoners of war. The prisoners of war, including arrested RSK officials, were transferred to detention facilities in Bjelovar, Požega and Varaždin for investigation of any involvement in war crimes. Some of the detainees were beaten or otherwise abused on the first evening of their detention, but treatment of the prisoners improved and was viewed as generally good. Three Jordanian soldiers serving with the UNCRO were wounded by HV fire.

Another consequence of Operation Flash was the displacement of the Serb population from the area—estimated at 13,000 to 14,000 prior to 1 May 1995. Two-thirds of that population fled the region during or immediately after the Croatian offensive. Furthermore, 2,000 were evacuated to Serb-held areas of Bosnia and Herzegovina on their own request within a month of Operation Flash. It was estimated that no more than 1,500 Serbs remained living in the area by the end of June. Serbian sources claim that 283 Serbs were killed and that between 15,000 and 30,000 were made refugees, while asserting that the population of the region was 15,000 prior to the offensive. Other Serbian and Russian sources claim the population size as high as 29,000. The Croatian Helsinki Committee reported a total of 83 civilians killed, including 30 who were killed near Novi Varoš where Serb civilians and the RSK military were intermingled as they fled south towards the Republika Srpska. A portion of the 30 killed in the retreating column were casualties of HV attacks, while others were killed by RSK troops to speed up the retreat.

=== Response ===
Akashi was criticised by the Human Rights Watch (HRW) for alleging "massive" human rights abuses by the HV despite a lack of evidence to support such claims. The organization also criticised Akashi's statement of 6 May claiming that the UNHCR office in Banja Luka interviewed 100 of the refugees from western Slavonia and determined that the refugee column was subjected to HV artillery and sniper attacks. The HRW concluded that three non-Serbian speaking UNHCR staff were unlikely to conduct proper interview of 100 people in just four days, assessing the circumstances of the interviews as being highly suspect. In contrast to Akashi, the HRW deemed that the HV's conduct was professional. Afterwards, United Nations Commission on Human Rights rapporteur Tadeusz Mazowiecki visited the area and concluded that there were serious breaches of humanitarian law and human rights by both sides in the conflict, albeit not on a massive scale.

The United Nations Security Council (UNSC) issued two statements, one on 1 May and the other on 4 May 1995, during and immediately after the operation, respectively. The first statement demanded that Croatia end its attack in the area, and that both Croatia and the RSK should abide with the economic and ceasefire agreements in place. The second statement reiterated the requests made three days earlier, adding the UNSC's condemnation of RSK attacks on Zagreb and other population centres, urged an immediate ceasefire brokered by Akashi and condemned the incursions of the HV in zones of separation in Banovina, Kordun, Lika and northern Dalmatia, near Knin (UNCRO Sectors North and South), as well as incursions by both the HV and the military of the RSK in eastern Slavonia (UNCRO Sector East). The statement called for the withdrawal of forces from the zones of separation in the Sectors North, South and East, but failed to request any pullout from the UNCRO Sector West—the area where Operation Flash had just been fought. The statements were supported by the UNSC Resolution 994. In August 1995, after Operation Storm, the UNCRO withdrew to the eastern Slavonia.

The RSK defeat worsened political confrontation there and led politicians in Serbia and RSK to blame each other, and the HV's success brought about a great psychological boost for Croatia. Croatia established a commemorative medal to be issued to the HV troops who took part in the operation, and commemorates Operation Flash by annual official celebrations in Okučani, while Serbs mark the anniversary of the battle by church services for their dead.

The International Criminal Tribunal for the former Yugoslavia, set up in 1993 based on the UN Security Council Resolution 827, tried Martić and Momčilo Perišić, the Chief of the General Staff of the Federal Republic of Yugoslavia at the time of Operation Flash, for various war crimes, including the Zagreb rocket attacks. Milan Martić, RSK president at the time of the offensive, was convicted and sentenced to 35 years of imprisonment on 12 June 2007, and Perišić received a prison sentence of 27 years on 6 September 2011. Martić's sentence was confirmed by the ICTY appeals chamber on 8 October 2008, while Perišić's conviction was overturned on 28 February 2013. As of April 2012, Croatian authorities are conducting an investigation into the killing of 23 individuals in Medari near Nova Gradiška, and charges were filed regarding the alleged mistreatment of prisoners of war in the detention facility in Varaždin.

After the war ended, the Serb National Council ensured the partial return of Serbs to areas exposed to Operations Flash, through the struggle for their fundamental human rights. The Human Rights Watch reported in 1999 that Serbs do not enjoy their civil rights as Croatian citizens, as a result of discriminatory laws and practices, particularly true for Serbs living in the four former United Nations Protected Areas, including Western Slavonia. In 2017 report, the Amnesty International expressed concern about persisting obstacles for Serbs to regain their property. They reported that Croatian Serbs continued to face discrimination in public sector employment and the restitution of tenancy rights to social housing vacated during the war. They also pointed to hate speech, "evoking fascist ideology" and the right to use minority languages and script continued to be politicized and unimplemented in some towns. However the Croatian courts regularly prosecuted cases of defamation and insult to the honour and reputation of persons. These offences were classified as serious criminal offences under the Criminal Code.
