= Dragašević =

Dragašević (Serbian Cyrillic: Драгашевић) is a Serbian surname. Notable people with the surname include:

- Antonina Dragašević (born 1948), Bulgarian and Serbian chess player
- Jovan Dragašević (1836–1915), Serbian military geographer, historian and writer
