= Medal for Participation in Operation Flash =

Croatian medal

Medal for Participation in Operation Flash Medalja za sudjelovanje u operaciji "Bljesak"
- Type: Military
- Awarded for: Participation in the Operation Flash
- Country: Republic of Croatia
- Presented by: the President of Croatia
- Eligibility: Croatian and foreign citizens
- Status: Active
- Established: 1 April 1995
- Ribbon of the Medal for Participation in Operation "Flash"

The Medal for Participation in Operation Flash (Croatian: Medalja za sudjelovanje u operaciji "Bljesak") is a medal awarded by the Republic of Croatia for participation in Operation Flash. The medal was founded on 1 April 1995.
