= Milan Čeleketić =

Serbian general

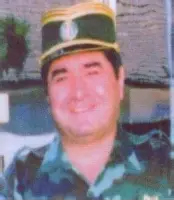
- Born: 12 August 1946 (age 80); Mokrin, PR Serbia, FPR Yugoslavia
- Military career
- Allegiance: Yugoslavia; FR Yugoslavia; Republika Srpska; Serbian Krajina
- Service years: 1971–1995
- Rank: Lieutenant colonel general
- Units: 16th Krajina Motorized Brigade (VRS); 18th Western Slavonian Corps (SVK)
- Conflicts: Croatian War; Pakrac clash; Operation Winter '94; Operation Leap 2; Operation Flash; Zagreb rocket attacks

Milan Čeleketić (Serbian Cyrillic: Милан Челекетић; born 12 August 1946) is a Serbian former major general active in the Serbian Army of Krajina and in the Armed Forces of FR Yugoslavia during the Yugoslav Wars.

== Biography ==
Čeleketić was the commander of the 18th Western Slavonian Corps of the Serbian Army of Krajina. He became Chief of the Main Staff of the Serbian Army of Krajina on 22 February 1994. After the fall of Western Slavonia, he resigned as Chief on 17 May 1995.

After Operation Storm, he lived in Banja Luka for a time.

Military offices
Preceded by Mile Novaković	Commander of the Serbian Army of Krajina; 22 February 1994 – 17 May 1995	Succeeded by Mile Mrkšić
