= Kirin, Croatia =

Kirin Кирин (Serbian)
- Village
- Location of Kirin in Croatia
- Coordinates: 45°24′21″N 15°53′29″E
- Country: Croatia
- Region: Continental Croatia
- County: Sisak-Moslavina County
- Municipality: Gvozd

Area
  - Total: 14.8 km^{2} (5.7 sq mi)
- Elevation: 196 m (643 ft)

Population (2021)
  - Total: 22
  - Density: 1.5/km^{2} (3.8/sq mi)
- Time zone: UTC+1 (CET)
  - Summer (DST): UTC+2 (CEST)
- Postal codes: 44410
- Area code: (+385) 44

Kirin (Serbian Cyrillic: Кирин) is a village in central Croatia, in the municipality of Gvozd, Sisak-Moslavina County. It is connected by the D6 highway.

== History ==
Kirin Republic (Croatian: Kirinska republika) was established on 2 August 1941.

== Demographics ==
According to the 2011 census, the village of Kirin has 52 inhabitants. This represents 16.25% of its pre-war population according to the 1991 census.

According to the 1991 census, 98.75% of the village population were ethnic Serbs (316/320), 0.31% were ethnic Croats (1/320), while 0.94% were of other ethnic origin (3/320).

Population change 1857-2011
v

population	996	959	891	1020	1102	1116	1111	1169	753	782	718	549	420	320	56	52	22
	1857	1869	1880	1890	1900	1910	1921	1931	1948	1953	1961	1971	1981	1991	2001	2011	2021

Sources: Croatian Bureau of Statistics publications

== Notable natives and residents ==
- Mile Novaković
