= Zagreb rocket attacks =

1995 rocket attacks on Croatian cities during the Croatian War of Independence

- The body of Ana Mutevelić lying on the intersection of Vlaška and Draškovićeva streets
- Location: Zagreb, Croatia
- Date: 2–3 May 1995
- Target: Downtown Zagreb; Zagreb Airport
- Attack type: Artillery rocket attack
- Weapon: 262 mm M-87 Orkan multiple rocket launcher armed with cluster bombs
- Deaths: 7
- Injuries: 214
- Perpetrator: Army of the Republic of Serb Krajina
- Motive: alleged retaliation for Croatian Army offensive in Operation Flash, Anti-Croat sentiment

The Zagreb rocket attacks were two rocket attacks conducted by the Army of the Republic of Serbian Krajina that used multiple rocket launchers to strike the Croatian capital of Zagreb during the Croatian War of Independence. The attack killed seven and wounded over 200 Croatian and foreign civilians. The missile attack was carried out on 2 May and 3 May 1995 as retaliation for the Croatian army's offensive in Operation Flash. The rocket attacks deliberately targeted civilian locations. Zagreb was the largest of several cities hit by the attack. It was not the only instance in the war in Croatia that cluster bombs were used in combat.

The International Criminal Tribunal for the former Yugoslavia (ICTY) found Croatian Serb leader Milan Martić criminally responsible for the crimes of murder, cruel treatment, and attacks on civilians; characterized the attack as a crime against humanity; and convicted him of ordering the attack.

== Introduction ==
During the early part of the war, the Croatian capital Zagreb was spared from devastation, as it was far from the frontlines. Serb General Milan Čeleketić announced to the press on 24 March 1995, more than a month prior to the attack, that should a Croatian offensive be launched, he expected to respond by targeting the "weak points," that is, "the parks of the Croatian cities" and added: "We know who the people in the parks are; civilians."

In May 1995 Croatia launched Operation Flash, which recaptured the area of western Slavonia (UNPA sector West) that had been under Serb control since 1991. In neighboring Bosnia, the leader of the Republika Srpska, Radovan Karadžić, threatened to send help to the Serbs in Croatia. Following the rapid collapse of the Serb defence in the area, Serb leader Milan Martić ordered Serb rocket artillery units in the self-proclaimed Republic of Serbian Krajina to fire missiles on the capital of Zagreb. Karlovac and Sisak were also subjected to retaliatory attacks.

The Yugoslav-produced Orkan 262 mm multiple rocket launchers (MRL) fires M-87 non-guided missiles. The ones fired against Zagreb were armed with aviation cluster bomb warheads (called cassette bombs or Jinglebell), each of which contains 288 "bomblets" (smaller ammunition) which are ejected at a height of 1,000 meters above the target area. Upon impact, each bomblet explodes and releases 420 pellets, the lethal range of each of which is ten meters. This means that each rocket releases around 120,000 of these pellets, which have been characterized as designed specifically to kill or maim local infantry.

== Strikes ==
An injured woman is tended to on Mažuranić Square, downtown Zagreb

On 1 May, a meeting was held between leaders of the RSK. Although negotiations were on-going, Martić and Čeleketić were not in favor of a peaceful solution. At 1 pm on 1 May, Milan Čeleketić ordered, with Martić present, an artillery barrage on Sisak which was opened at 5 pm that day. On the same day, an M-87 Orkan rocket artillery unit from Knin was redeployed to Vojnić (about 50 km south of Zagreb).

The first attack occurred on 2 May, at 10:25 in the morning. At the time, many civilians were in the streets. The targets hit included the Strossmayer promenade, the Petrinjska street and the Vlaška Street, where a tram full of passengers was hit. The Classical Gymnasium located in the city centre was also hit, as well as Zagreb Airport. In total, five civilians were killed and 146 injured.

The second attack occurred the following day, at 12:10 in the afternoon. The children's hospital in Klaićeva street, the Croatian National Theatre building (which housed Russian, Ukrainian and British ballet dancers at the time, some of whom were wounded) and the Courthouse at Nikola Šubić Zrinski Square were among those hit.

Two civilians were killed that day and 48 injured, which were less than the day before due to many people avoiding public areas following the first attack. Most of the missiles targeted the city center and surrounding streets, which were most likely to be filled with civilians in the morning. In total, seven people were killed and about 200 injured (of which about 100 seriously) from these attacks.

== Aftermath ==
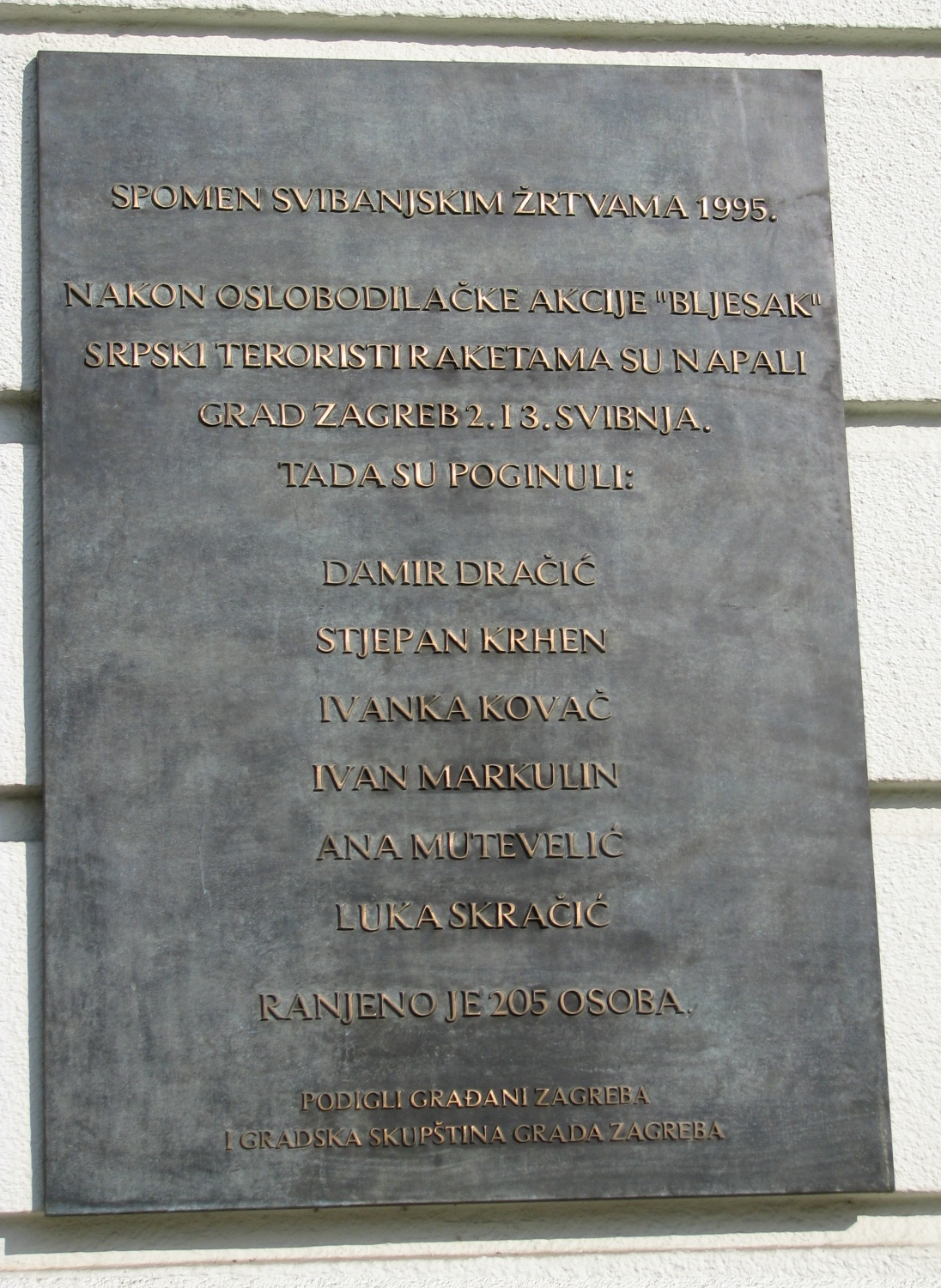
A plaque commemorating victims of the rocket attack

On 3 May, Slobodan Milošević, President of Serbia at the time, instructed Yugoslav Army Chief of the General Staff Momčilo Perišić to call Čeleketić and forbid further strikes against Zagreb.

After 4 May and the end of Operation Flash, United Nations Special Envoy Yasushi Akashi met with Martić and condemned him for the attack. Martić then threatened to resume the attacks and spoke of "massive rocket attacks on Zagreb which would leave 100,000 people dead."

On October 10, 2013, a cluster bomb which failed to detonate was discovered on the roof of the Klaićeva children's hospital, 18 years after the attacks. After surgery on several patients had been completed, the Zagreb police bomb disposal squad was given clearance to detonate the ordnance. No one was injured in the detonation.

In May 2013, city mayor Milan Bandić opened a museum in Petrićeva St. dedicated to the tragedy.

== War crimes trials by the ICTY ==
Milan Martić, President of the Republic of Serbian Krajina and Supreme Commander of the SVK, ordered the shelling of three Croatian cities: Zagreb, Sisak and Karlovac. On 2 May 1995, at approximately 10:25 hours, on the order of Milan Martić, General Čeleketić of the SVK ordered his subordinates to fire an Orkan Multiple Barrel Rocket Launcher fitted with "cluster bomb" warheads from the area of Petrova Gora into the central part of Zagreb and the airport (Pleso). These rockets impacted in several locations within the central commercial district of Zagreb, primarily the areas of Stara Vlaška Street, Josip Juraj Strossmayer Square and Krizaniceva Street. During this unlawful attack, at least five civilians were killed and at least 146 civilians wounded. On 3 May 1995, at approximately 12:10 hours on the orders of Milan Martic, the Orkan Multiple Barrel Rocket Launcher fitted with "cluster bomb" warheads was once again fired from the area of Petrova Gora into the centre of Zagreb. Rockets impacted in the areas of Klaiceva Street, Meduliceva Street, Ilica Street and near the Croatian National Theatre. This unlawful attack caused the deaths of two civilians and wounded forty-eight others.

— War Crimes Indictment against Momčilo Perišić

Immediately following the attacks, Martić appeared on Serb television and publicly boasted about ordering the attacks. This video was later used against him during his trial at the International Criminal Tribunal for the former Yugoslavia (ICTY) after he was indicted for war crimes. The attack on Zagreb was one of the main points of the indictment against him, to which he confessed, but claimed it was a "legitimate action against the enemy". For this specific case, the ICTY found Martić criminally responsible for the crimes of murder, cruel treatment, and attacks on civilians. On June 12, 2007, he was sentenced to 35 years in prison (the sentence included other crimes across Croatia since 1991).

Perišić, was also indicted for his role in the rocket attack. He was sentenced to 27 years in prison because the judges ruled that he had effective control over the SVK commanders since he issued orders to them and initiated disciplinary proceedings against them; therefore he was responsible for the failure to punish those who launched the rockets on Zagreb. In February 2013, Perišić was acquitted on all counts and released upon appealing his conviction.

In the mid-morning of the 2nd of May 1995, without warning, several Orkan rockets struck locations in Zagreb, including the main square, several shopping streets, a school, the village of Pleso near Zagreb airport and the airport itself. Five persons, all civilians, were killed in these attacks and at least 160 persons were severely injured. Many of these victims still today suffer from their injuries. At midday the following day, 3rd May 1995, Zagreb was again shelled by Orkan rockets. The areas hit were the Croatian National Theatre at Marshal Tito Square, a children’s hospital, as well as another square. These attacks claimed two lives and injured 54 people. Many of these victims also still suffer from their injuries.

— The ICTY in its verdict against Milan Martić

== See also ==
- Trial of Milan Martić
- History of Zagreb
