= Montenegrin cap =

Traditional hat

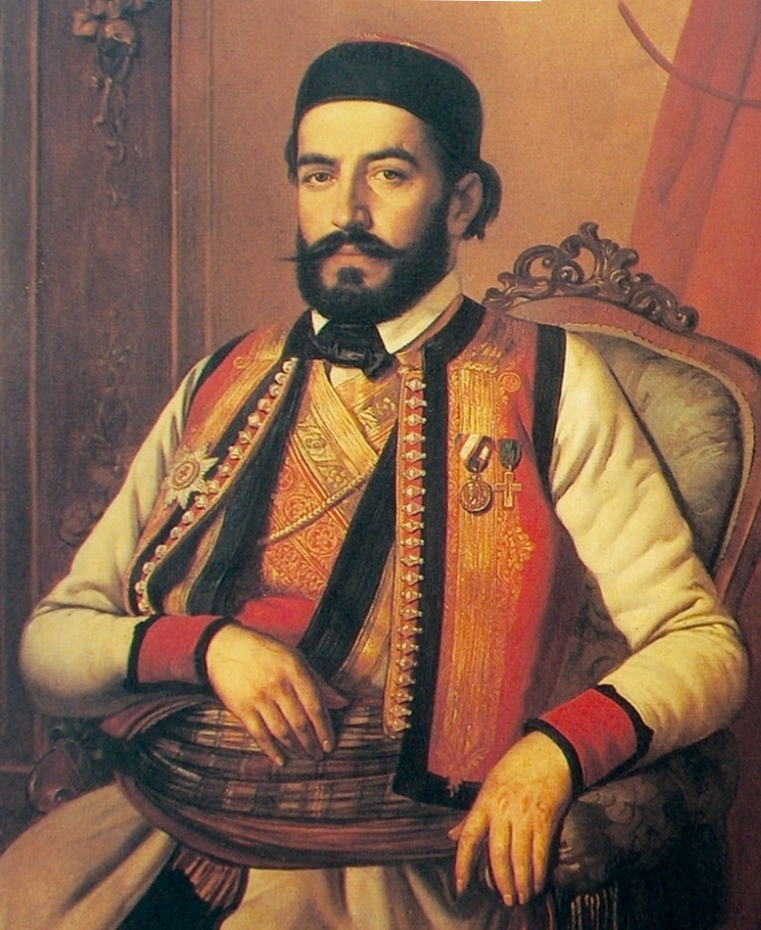
Prince Bishop Petar II Petrović-Njegoš donning the Montenegrin cap he popularized

The Montenegrin cap (Serbian: Црногорска капа, romanized: Crnogorska kapa), refers to a flat cylindrical cap with a red top and black brim, traditionally worn in Old Montenegro and Eastern Herzegovina. It was further popularized by Prince-Bishop Petar II Petrović-Njegoš in the mid-1840s as a replacement for the then-popular Ottoman red fez. It is the common headgear in the traditional costume of Montenegro.

The cap (or rather, hat) is in the shape of a flat cylinder, with a red colour upper surface called tepelak, and an external wrap of cotton or silk fabric in black colour called deravija. The deravija was easily worn out and exchanged. It is also called zavratka (завратка) in Herzegovina.

== Symbolism ==
In the 19th century Serbian and Montenegrin leaders used the Battle of Kosovo (1389) and Kosovo Myth as an idea for the historical continuation in national rebirth. There exists several folkloristic interpretations of the cap's design. Folklore recorded the most popular interpretation as the black wrapper being a sign of grief for the Serbs' once great empire, the red a symbol of spilled blood at the Battle of Kosovo (1389). Another interpretation is that the black wrap is a sign of grief for the heroes fallen at Kosovo, the red for blood spilt, and the golden sewing the struggle of enslaved Montenegro against the Ottoman Empire. There are various interpretations on the golden sewing on the top. Njegoš distributed the cap among the tribal leaders as a sign of Serbdom (and Serb national identity).

== History ==
The first depiction of a Montenegrin cap is allegedly from an aquarelle of Austrian diplomat F. Vukassovich from 1782 depicting armed Montenegrins.

Serbian philologist Vuk Karadžić (1787–1864) recorded the Serbian usage kariklija (кариклија) and karikača (карикача, from "kara", black and kačket–casquette) in the dictionary Srpski rječnik (1818) as simply "a round cap [mütze] of Herzegovina", then elaborated on it in later dictionaries: of red fabric, a tubular top as the fez, with a black lining (wrap) "where some in battle carry cartridges as they are more convenient than in pouches". He also recorded šišak as the name for "the Montenegrin and Herzegovinian cap which is called kariklija in Serbia". In 1837 Karadžić described the Montenegrin headgear as "red cloth hats ... lined with black cloth on the outside; when the cloth is torn, the entire hat remains red. They keep money and other small items beneath their hats, and in wartime, cartridges, so that they can be easily reached. Many wear scarves of various colors around their hats, which are often silk among younger and wealthier people, and when wrapped like this they look like a small turban." A cap was donated to the Russian Academy of Sciences in 1838.

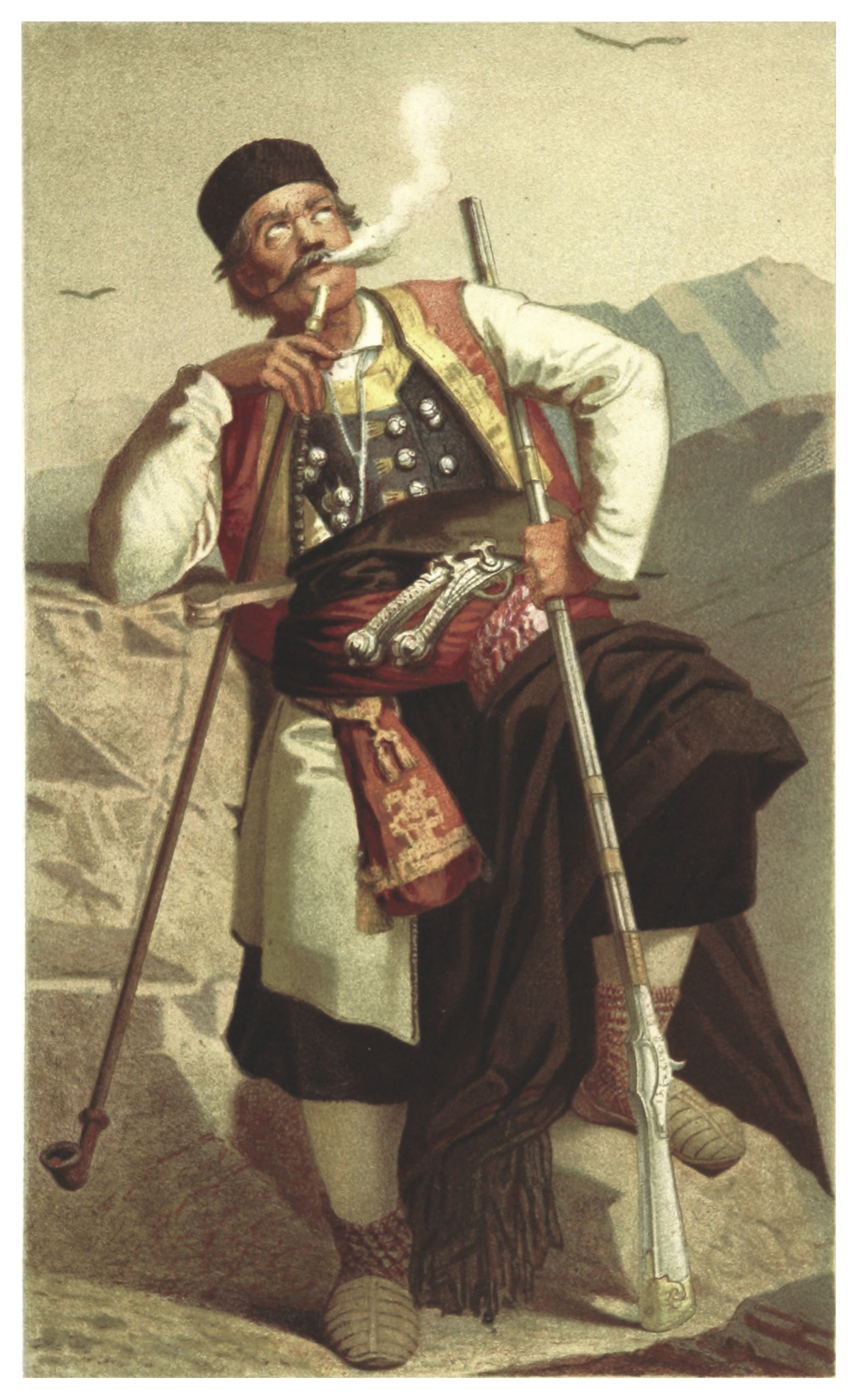
Illustration of a Montenegrin man smoking (1870).

The cap was popularized since the mid-19th century, tied to Prince-Bishop Petar II Petrović-Njegoš (r. 1830–1851) who wore it in his portrait (1851). Njegoš in the mid-1840s declared it a replacement for the then-popular Ottoman fez. Njegoš distributed the cap among the tribal leaders as a sign of Serbdom (and Serb national identity). In the 19th century, the names šišak, zavratka and kariklija were used for the cap. In the second half of the 19th century it was used by the urban citizens and military of Montenegro. The zavrata/zavratka in Herzegovina was not massively worn until the outbreak of the Herzegovina Uprising in 1875 and introduction from Montenegro, when it became part of rebel uniform.

It was made part of the official army uniform during the reign of Nicholas I of Montenegro, and was thus less of an ethnic marker and more of a symbol of military honour, loyalty to the fatherland and following the Petrović dynasty. A popular embroidery on the top was the initials НI (Nicholas I). Josef Holeček, on his journey through Montenegro in 1876, described the Montenegrin cap and the eagle on the coat of arms. Nina H. Kennard mentioned on her travels to Herzegovina and Montenegro in 1876, the "Montenegrin hat, with the initials of the Prince, N. I. (Nicholas I.), embroidered in gold on the crown, and a black silk band round the edge, put on as mourning for the occupation of Servia by the Turks".

In 1895, Sima Trojanović travelled Herzegovina and mentioned the traditional headgear worn by men as zavratka and kapica. Russian ethnologist Pavel Rovinsky (1831–1916) studied Montenegro and mentioned the kapica as of "not old origin", used during the reign of Prince Danilo I (r. 1852–1860) when it was known as šišak, and now zavratka, as it is also called in Herzegovina.

A popular embroidery following the 1918 unification was the Serb cross (with the popular interpretation "Only Unity Saves the Serbs"), to signify Serb unification and national identity. In 1941, during massacres of Serbs by the Croatian Axis Ustashe, the Herzegovinian Serbs were ordered to remove their zavratka. The Socialist Yugoslav authorities tried to remove the usage of the Serb cross by manufacturing versions with the Communist Red Star, but this was not accepted. In the prelude of Montenegrin independence (2004) the hat in Montenegro was manufactured with the embroidery at the top including the coat of arms of Montenegro, as a sign of sovereignty and Montenegrin nationalism. Montenegro proclaimed independence in 2006. The Serbs of Montenegro continue using the version with the Serb cross.

== Gallery ==
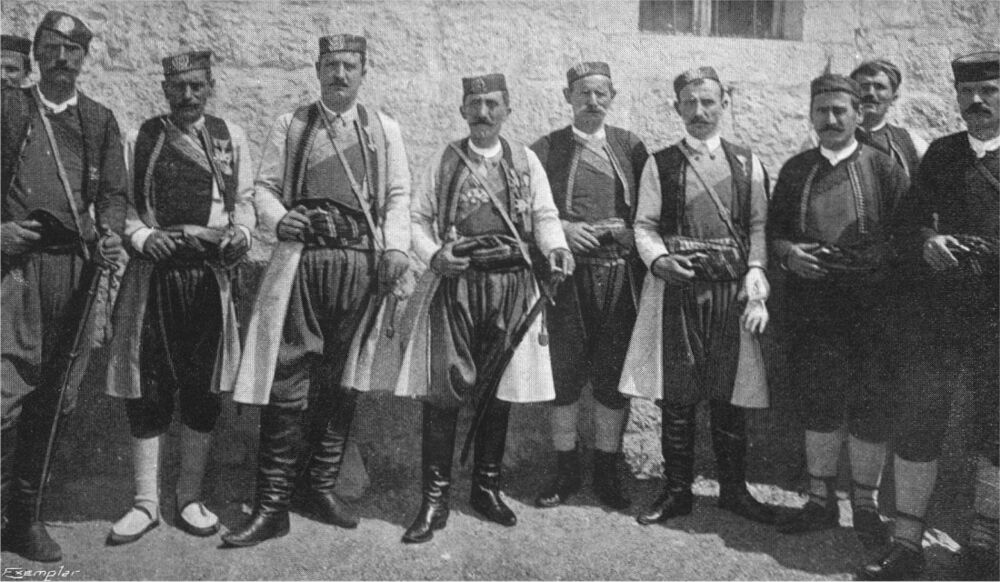
Officers of the Royal Montenegrin Army wearing their caps, 1904.

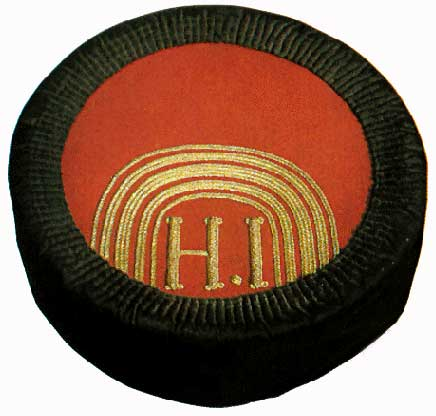
A cap with the initials N.I. of King Nicholas I.

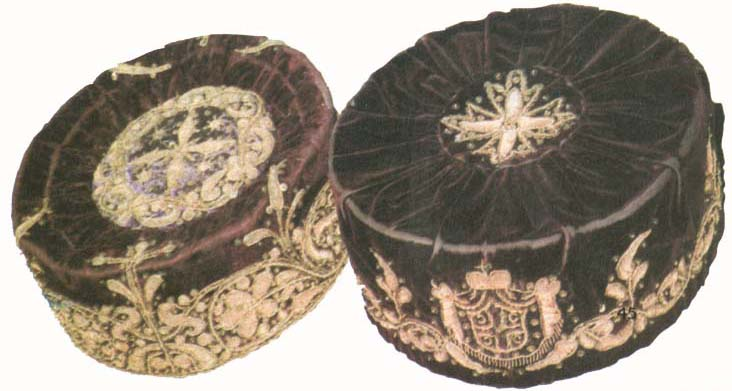
Richly adorned caps worn by King Nicholas I (right) and his queen Milena.

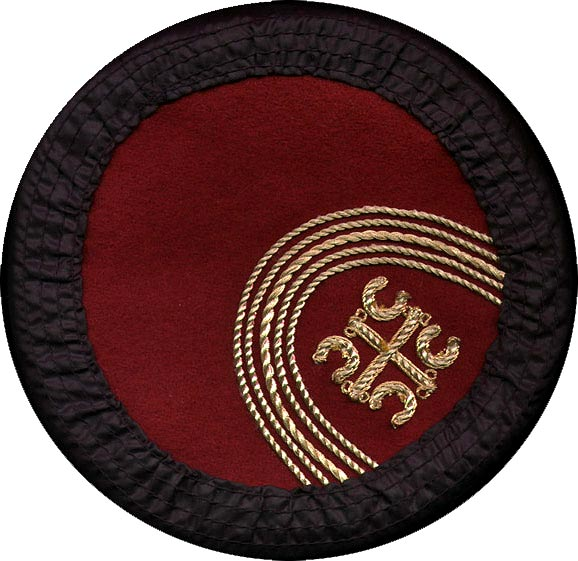
Montenegrin cap with the Serbian cross.

== See also ==
- Culture of Montenegro

== Annotations ==
1. In the embroidered Montenegrin versions during the reign of Prince Danilo I Petrović-Njegoš, five small stripes on the top represent the remaining lands of the once great Serbian realm, and within the stripes was a six-pointed star representing the last free part, Montenegro, shining upon the fallen and conquered. Interpreting another embroidery design of the cap, the golden arches symbolize centuries of ascending from the Battle of Kosovo, and the sun rays the battle itself.
2. The word šišak derives from šišati ("to cut"), with the meaning of "small cap". The word zavratka is derived from za vrata ("behind the neck"), as it was worn tilted back, or from zavrtalo (spun), as the top was circular. The word kapica means "little cap".

== Sources ==
- Matić, Ljubomir (1966). Речник српскохрватског књижевног и народног језика. Institut za srpski jezik SANU. p. 218.
- Mikhailova, A. A. (2018). "ТРАДИЦИЯ И ВЫЗОВЫ МОДЕРНИЗАЦИИ: "ЧЕРНОГОРСКАЯ ШАПКА" В МУЗЕЙНОЙ РЕТРОСПЕКТИВЕ" (PDF). Вещь В Трансляции Этничности. Российский этнографический музей: 188–194.
- Vlahović, Miodrag (1953). "O najstarijoj kapi kod jugoslovena s obzirom na zbirku kapa etnografskog muzeja u Beogradu". Glasnik Etnografskog muzeja u Beogradu. Belgrade: Etnografski muzej Beograda.
