= Begovich =

Begovich is a surname. Notable people with the surname include:

- John C. Begovich
- Mike Begovich (born 1974), American actor
- Tony Begovich (born 1967), Australian rules footballer

== See also ==
- Alexander Bekovich-Cherkassky, Russian general defeated at Khiva in 1717
- Begović
