= Savo Štrbac =

Serbian lawyer and author (born 1949)

- Саво Штрбац
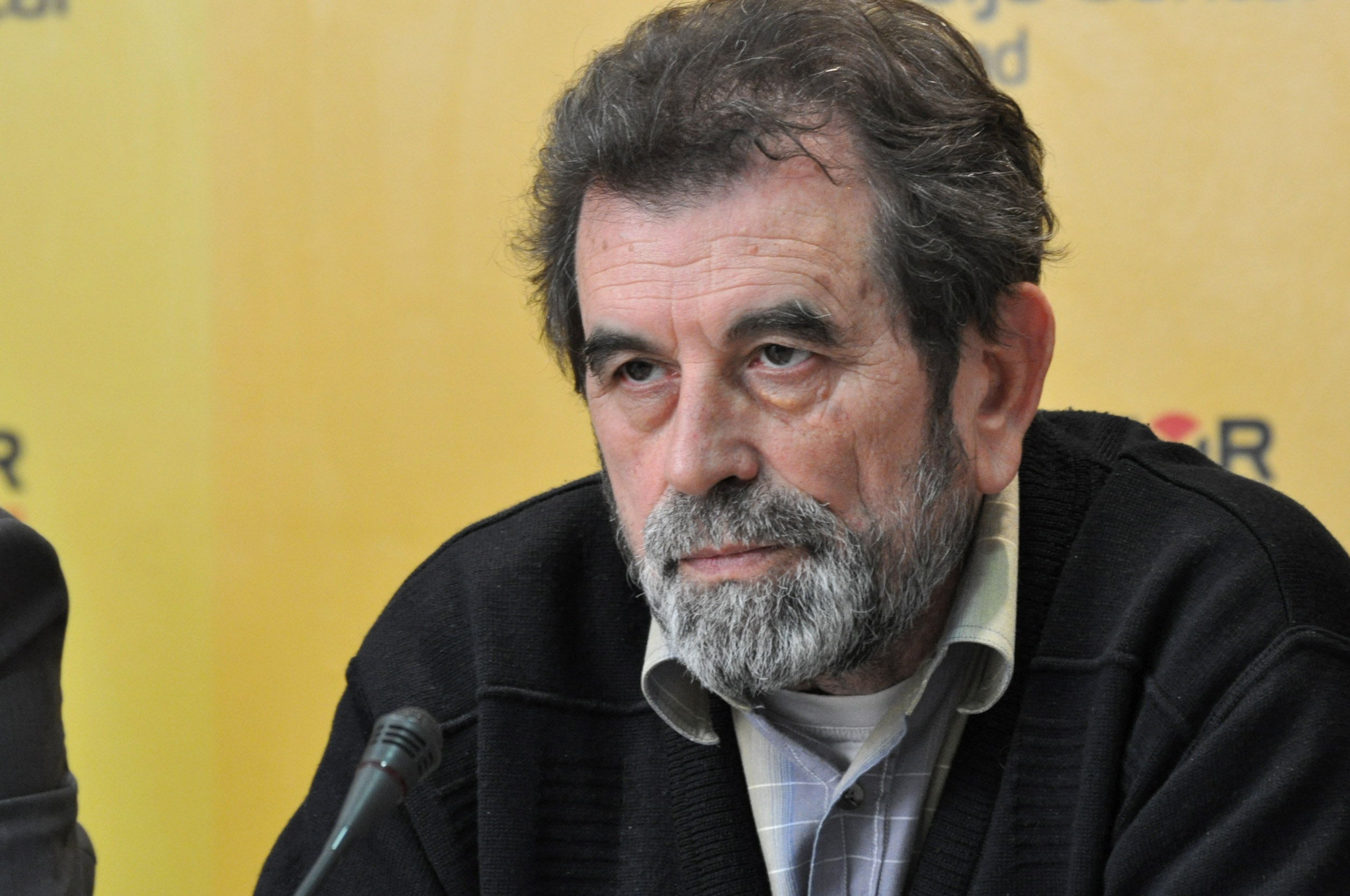

Personal details
- Born: 1949 (age 76–77) Benkovac, PR Croatia, Yugoslavia
- Children: 2
- Education: University of Zagreb

Savo Štrbac (Serbian Cyrillic: Саво Штрбац; born 1949) is a Croatian Serb lawyer and author. He is best-known for reporting on Serbian missing victims of the Croatian War of Independence.

== Early life and education ==
Štrbac was born in Raštević, near Benkovac, PR Croatia, which was part of Yugoslavia at the time. He earned a degree in law from the University of Zagreb.

== Career ==
From 1977 to 1990, he worked as a judge of the Municipal Court in Benkovac and of the District Court in Zadar. During the Breakup of Yugoslavia, he was involved in the work of the Republic of Serbian Krajina (RSK) Commission for Prisoner Exchanges, at first as a Commission member and from 1993 as its chairman. The same year, he also became Secretary of the RSK.

Since 1994, he worked with the now-former chief prosecutor at the ICTY, Carla del Ponte, in preparing indictments against Croatian generals in the Trial of Gotovina et al.

In 1995, Serbian newspaper reports in Večernje novosti described Štrbac as Secretary to the Government, meeting with UNPROFOR officials on August 4 during Operation Storm, together with Colonel Kosta Novaković and other representatives of the RSK. In September news reports, he was described as the head of Veritas in the reporting on Croatian war crimes.

Štrbac has been the head of the Serbian NGO "Veritas" since.

In 2012, Štrbac was part of Serbia's legal team before the ICJ in the Croatia–Serbia genocide case.

He contributed to the movie "15 Minutes – Massacre in Dvor" about a 1995 massacre of 10 disabled Serbian civilians, released in 2015 at the Sarajevo Film Festival. The movie was based on statements by Štrbac and Mile Novaković, which led to public criticism in Croatia as well as threats to the production team.

== Personal life ==
He has two children and lives in Belgrade.

In 2012, after the convictions of Ante Gotovina and Mladen Markač were reversed, he stated that "Croats gave huge money for generals' freedom".

== Works ==
- Ravni kotari - Maslenica 1993, Informaciono-dokumentacioni centar „Veritas“
- Krvavi spetembar u Lici - 1993, Informaciono-dokumentacioni centar „Veritas“, 1996
- Miljevački plato - juni 1992., Informaciono-dokumentacioni centar „Veritas“, 1996
- Srpska zapadna Slavonija - maj 1995, Informaciono-dokumentacioni centar „Veritas“, Svetigora, 1997
- Srpska Krajina - avgust 1995, Informaciono-dokumentacioni centar „Veritas“, Svetigora, 1997
- Nestala lica na području Hrvatske, Informaciono-dokumentacioni centar „Veritas“, Art-print, Banjaluka
- Sudbine ljudi sa potrežnih lista, Informaciono-dokumentacioni centar „Veritas“, Belgrade, 1999
- Zvona Svetog Ćirita, Informaciono-dokumentacioni centar „Veritas“, Banjaluka, 2000
- Zvona sudbine, Informaciono-dokumentacioni centar „Veritas“, Banjaluka, 2005
- Štrbac, Savo (2005–2015). Hronika prognanih Krajišnika I-V. Belgrade: Grafid, DIC Veritas.
- Štrbac, Savo (2011). Rat i riječ. Knin-Banja Luka-Beograd: Grafid, Dokumentaciono-informacioni centar Veritas. ISBN 9789993853749.
- Štrbac, Savo (2015). Gone with the Storm: A Chronicle of Ethnic Cleansing of Serbs from Croatia. Knin-Banja Luka-Belgrade: Grafid, DIC Veritas. ISBN 9789995589806.

== Sources ==
- Radoš, Ivan (2011). "Operacija "Oluja" i srbijanski dnevni tisak (Večernje novosti i Politika)". Journal of Contemporary History (in Croatian). 43 (1): 293–327.
