= Begich =

Begich may refer to:

== People ==
- Begich, commander of the Tatars in the Battle of the Vozha River in 1378
- Begich family of Alaska and Minnesota, United States, including:
  - Joseph Begich (1930–2019), Minnesota House of Representatives (1975–1993)
  - Nick Begich Sr. (1932–1972), United States Representative from Alaska (1971–1972)
  - Nick Begich III (born 1977), Alaska politician
  - Mark Begich (born 1962), former United States Senator from Alaska (2009–2015)
  - Tom Begich (born 1960), member of the Alaska Senate

== Other ==
- Begich Middle School, Anchorage, Alaska
- Begich Towers, Whittier, Alaska
- The Begich, Boggs Visitor Center at Portage Glacier, near Whittier

== See also ==
- Begić, a surname
