= List of Serbian mottos =

The following is a list of mottos connected to Serbia and Serbs. Serbia has no official national motto.

== Mottos ==
- "Only Unity Saves the Serbs" (Само слога Србина спасава / Samo sloga Srbina spasava), unofficial Serbian national motto; interpretation of what is taken to be four Cyrillic letters for "S" (written С) on the Serbian cross.
- "For Freedom and Honour of the Fatherland" (За слободу и част Отаџбине / Za slobodu i čast Otadžbine), motto of the Serbian Armed Forces, found on uniforms as well as on brigade flags.

=== Historical mottos ===
- "For the Honored Cross and Golden Liberty" (За крст часни и слободу златну / Za krst časni i slobodu zlatnu).
- "With God, for Faith and Fatherland" (С Богом, за веру и отечество / S Bogom, za veru i otečestvo), motto of the Serbian Revolutionary Army.
- "Time and my right" (Време и моје право / Vreme i moje pravo), motto of the Obrenović dynasty.
- "All for Serbdom and the Fatherland" (Све за Српство и отаџбину / Sve za Srpstvo i otadžbinu), motto of Narodna Odbrana.
- "Liberty or Death" (Слобода или смрт / Sloboda ili smrt), motto of the Chetniks.
- "For King and Fatherland" (За краља и отачаствo / Za kralja i otačastvo), motto of the Royal Serbian Army, found on regimental infantry flags.
- "For the Faith, King and Fatherland" (За веру, краља и отачаство / Za veru, kralja i otačastvo), motto of the Royal Serbian Army, found on regimental cavalry flags.
- "For King and Fatherland, with Faith in God" (С вером у Бога, за краља и отаџбину / S verom u Boga, za kralja i otadžbinu), motto of the Royal Serbian Army (during World War I) and Chetniks (during World War II).
- "For King and Fatherland, Freedom or Death" (За краља и отаџбину, слобода или смрт / Za kralja i otadžbinu, sloboda ili smrt), motto of the Chetniks.

== Slogans ==
- "Kosovo is Serbia" (Косово је Србија / Kosovo je Srbija), slogan and catch-phrase used in Serbia since Kosovo's 2008 declaration of independence.
- "Serbia to Tokyo" (Србија до Токија / Srbija do Tokija), slogan and catch-phrase used by both Serbian nationalists (to taunt rival neighbouring ethnic groups) and Serbs (jokingly mocking Serb exceptionalism) alike.

== Gallery ==
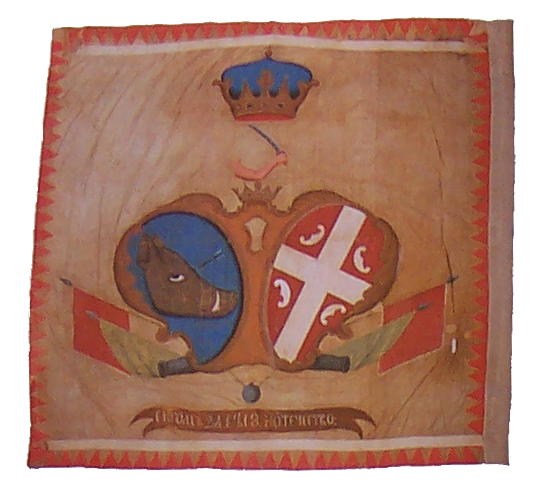
Flag of the Serbian Revolutionary Army with motto "With God, for Faith and Fatherland"

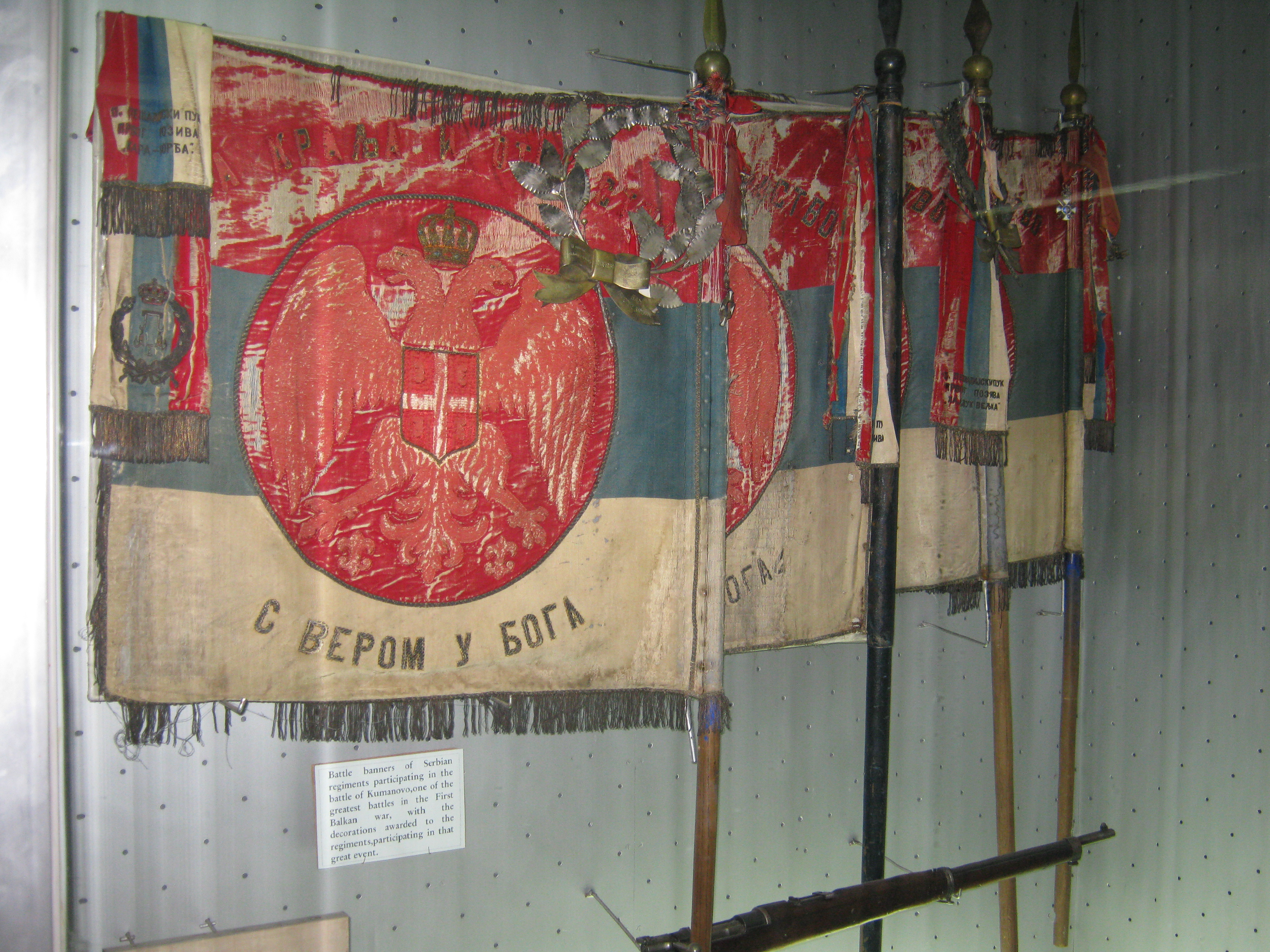
Regimental flags of the Royal Serbian Army with motto "For King and Fatherland, with Faith in God"

Flag of Chetniks with motto "For Crown and Fatherland; Liberty or Death"

Flag of the Serbian Armed Forces with motto "For Liberty and Honour of the Fatherland"

== See also ==
- National symbols of Serbia

== Sources ==
- MO SCG (2007). "Odbrana". Odbrana: Magazin Ministarstva Odbrane SCG. 3–4 (53–58). Novinsko-izdavački centar "Vojska": 71–72.
- Samardžić, Dragana (1993). Старе заставе у Војном Музеју. Vojni muzej.
- Samardžić, Dragana (1983). Vojne zastave Srba do 1918. Belgrade: Vojni muzej.
