= Main Staff of the Serbian Army of Krajina =

Highest staff organization in the Serbian Army of Krajina

- Главни штаб Српске војске Крајине; Glavni štab Srpske vojske Krajine
- Active: 1992–1995
- Country: Republic of Serbian Krajina
- Allegiance: Serbian Army of Krajina
- Branch: Active duty
- Type: Staff
- Part of: Ministry of Defence
- Garrison/HQ: Knin

Commanders
- Notable commanders: Mile Novaković; Milan Čeleketić; Mile Mrkšić

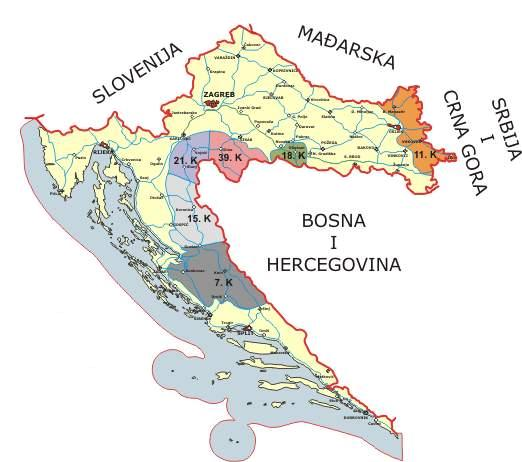
Territorial organization of SVK

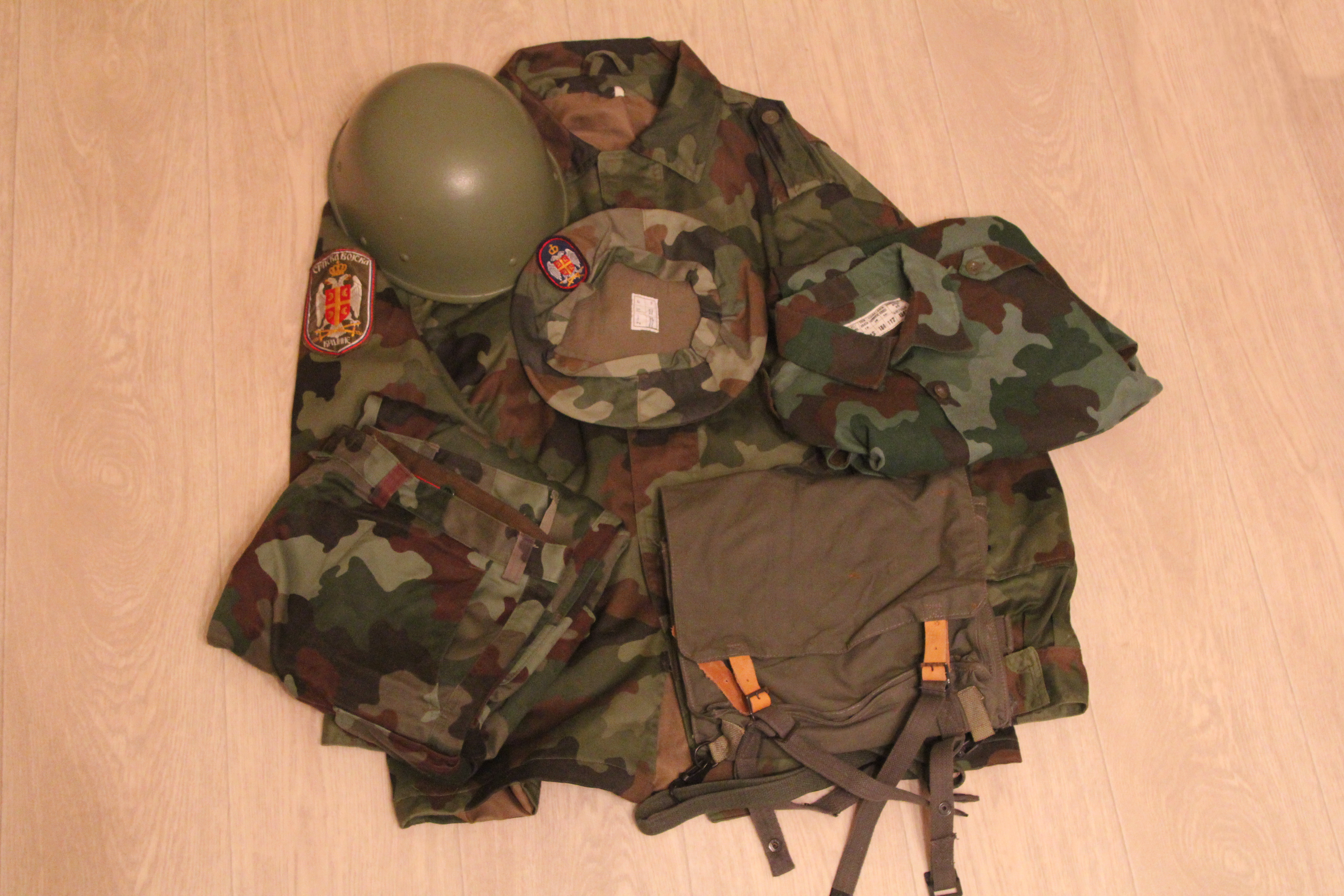
Uniform of SVK

The Main Staff of the Serbian Army of Krajina (Serbian: Главни штаб Српске војске Крајине / Glavni štab Srpske vojske Krajine) was the highest professional and staff organ for preparation and use of the Serbian Army of Krajina in war and in peace.

The Main Staff was formed on 16 October 1992, and its activities started on 27 November of the same year. During its existence, the Main Staff had constant problems with personnel.

== Organization ==
The Main Staff consisted of the following sectors:

- Operational activities
- Informational
- Religious and justice affairs
- Logistical support
- Security
- Intelligence
- Air Force and Air Defence
- Recruitment and mobilization
- Army Inspectorate

The Main Staff had direct control over:

- 2nd Guards Motorized Brigade
- 105th Aviation Brigade
- 44th Artillery-Rocket Brigade of the Air Defence
- 75th Mixed Artillery Brigade
- 75th Rear Base
- Training Center "1300 Corporals"
- Military Police Battalion
- Communications Battalion
- House of the Army
- Army Library
- Army Band
- Training Center "Alpha"

On the other hand, a joint command existed in the Main Staff, which coordinated activities of all departments. It was headed by Major general Borislav Đukić (1993–1994) and Major general Dušan Lončar (1994–1995).

== List of commanders ==
No.	Picture	Commander	Took office	Left office	Time in office	Defence branch
1	Mile Novaković	Major general Mile Novaković (1950–2015)	27 November 1992	22 February 1994	1 year, 87 days	Army
2	Milan Čeleketić	Major general Milan Čeleketić (born 1946)	22 February 1994	17 May 1995	1 year, 84 days	Army
3	Mile Mrkšić	General; Mile Mrkšić (1947–2015)	17 May 1995	7 August 1995	82 days	Army

== See also ==
- Serbian Army of Krajina

== Bibliography ==
- Vrcelj, Маrko (2002). War for Serbian Krajina: 1991–1995 (in Serbian). Belgrade/Knin: Srpsko kulturno društvo Zora. p. 254. ISBN 86-83809-06-4.
- Novaković, Kosta (2009). Serbian Krajina: rises, falls, elevations (in Serbian). Belgrade: Srpsko kulturno društvo Zora. ISBN 978-86-83809-54-7.
- Sekulić, Milisav (2000). Knin Fell in Belgrade. Bad Vilbel: Nidda Verlag.
