= Begovići =

- Village
- Location of Begovići in Croatia
- Coordinates: 45°17′56″N 16°19′41″E
- Country: Croatia
- Region: Continental Croatia (Banovina)
- County: Sisak-Moslavina
- Municipality: Petrinja

Area
  - Total: 18.4 km^{2} (7.1 sq mi)

Population (2021)
  - Total: 53
  - Density: 2.9/km^{2} (7.5/sq mi)
- Time zone: UTC+1 (CET)
  - Summer (DST): UTC+2 (CEST)
- Postal code: 44204 Jabukovac
- Area code: (+385) 44

Begovići is a village in central Croatia, in the Town of Petrinja, Sisak-Moslavina County. It is connected by the D30 highway.

== History ==
On 25 March 2022 at 16:14 the JVP Petrinja received a call about a wildfire in the area. 30 hectares (74 acres) burned by the time it was put out at 18:50.

== Demographics ==
According to the 2011 census, the village of Begovići has 58 inhabitants. This represents 32.77% of its pre-war population according to the 1991 census.

Population change 1857-2011
v

population	139	176	199	225	288	373	297	360	267	274	282	254	239	177	52	58
	1857	1869	1880	1890	1900	1910	1921	1931	1948	1953	1961	1971	1981	1991	2001	2011

Sources: Croatian Bureau of Statistics publications

== Notable people ==
- Nikola Begović
