= Boris Begović =

Serbian economist

Boris Begović (Борис Беговић; born 1956) is an economic scholar in Serbia who has written and spoken on economic problems in the Balkans.

Begović has written a number of papers for the Centre for Liberal-Democratic Studies.
