= Begić =

Begić is a surname derived from the Turkish honorific title bey (known as beg in Serbro-Croatian). It may refer to:

- Aida Begić (born 1976), Bosnian film director and screenwriter
- Ana-Marija Begić (born 1994), Croatian basketball player
- Denis Begic (born 1970), Swedish politician
- Dominik Begić (born 1997), Bosnian footballer
- Elvedin Begić (born 1961), Bosnian football official
- Mirza Begić (born 1985) Bosnian-Slovenian professional basketball player
- Senad Begić (born 1969), Bosnian footballer
- Silvije Begić (born 1993), Croatian footballer
- Tjaš Begić (born 2003), Slovenian footballer
- Vera Begić (b. 1982) Croatian field events athlete
- Vilko Begić (1874–1946) Croatian military officer

== See also ==
- Beg (disambiguation)
- Begich (disambiguation)
- Baig
- Bey
- Mirza
