= Ivo Begović =

Croatian water polo player

Personal information
- Nationality: Croatian
- Born: 22 March 1993 (age 33) Dubrovnik, Croatia
- Height: 1.88 m (6 ft 2 in)
- Weight: 108 kg (238 lb)

Sport
- Country: Croatia
- Sport: Water polo
- Club: VK Solaris

Ivo Begović (born 22 March 1993) is a Croatian water polo player. He is currently playing for VK Solaris. He is 6 ft 2 in (1.88 m) tall and weighs 238 lb (108 kg).
