= Jovan Dragašević =

Serbian military officer and politician

Colonel Jovan Dragašević
- Serbian Cyrillic: Јован Драгашевић
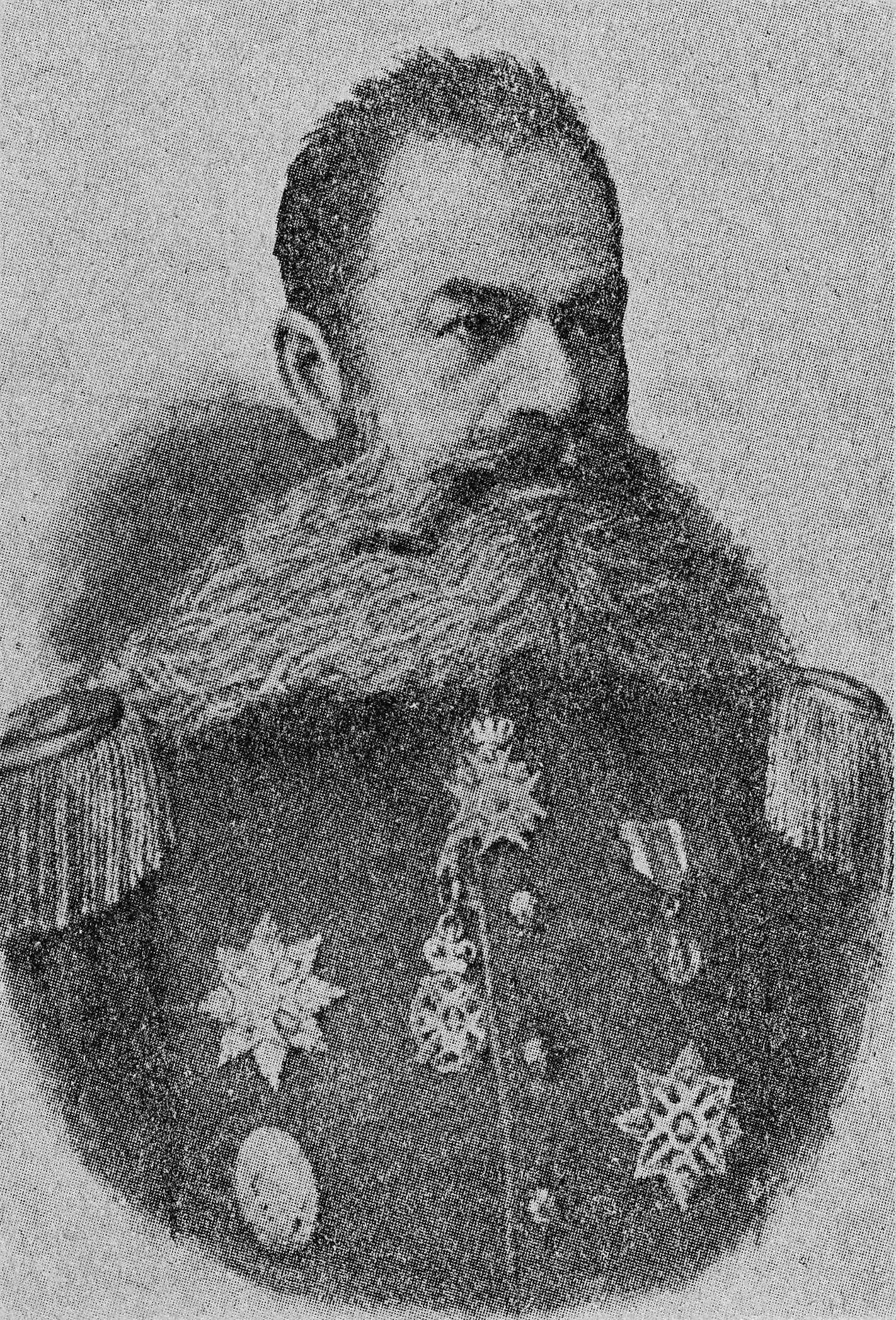
- Born: February 16, 1836; Požarevac, Principality of Serbia
- Died: July 14, 1915 (aged 79); Niš, Kingdom of Serbia
- Burial place: Belgrade New Cemetery; 44°48′34″N 20°29′14″E
- Spouse: Mila Dragašević
- Children: 3
- Military career
- Allegiance: Principality of Serbia; Kingdom of Serbia
- Branch: Armed Forces of the Principality of Serbia; Royal Serbian Army
- Service years: 1860–1888
- Rank: General Staff Colonel; General (honorary; awarded 13 July 1900)
- Commands: General Staff (Acting Chief)
- Conflicts: Serbian–Ottoman Wars (1876–1878)
- Awards: Order of the Cross of Takovo; Order of St. Sava

Jovan Dragašević (Serbian Cyrillic: Јован Драгашевић; 16 February 1836 – 14 July 1915) was a Serbian military geographer, historian and writer.

== Biography ==
Dragašević was born in Požarevac.

As Lieutenant Colonel of the Armed Forces of the Principality of Serbia, he was Acting Chief of the Serbian General Staff from 1877 to 1878, during the Serbian–Ottoman Wars (1876–1878).

He was also lecturer at the Military Academy and the Higher School in Belgrade, as well as honorary member of the Serbian Royal Academy.

== Works ==
- Pesme, Zemun, 1860
- Vojnička stilistika, 1—2, Belgrade, 1871—1876
- Načela vojne geografije, Belgrade, 1876
- Vojnička rečitost, Belgrade, 1876
- Istinske priče, Belgrade, 1888
- Carica Jelena, Belgrade, 1890
- Apodiksis, Belgrade, 1891

== Literature ==
- Ivetić, Velimir (2000). Načelnici generalštaba 1876—2000. Beograd: Novinsko-informativni centar VOJSКA.
- Radojčić, Stevan (2011). "Kosmometrija Jovana Dragaševića" (PDF). Zbornik radova konferencije "Razvoj astronomije kod Srba VI", Beograd, 22—26 April 2010 (Ur. M. S. Dimitrijević) (10). Beograd: Publikacija Astronomskog društva "Ruđer Bošković": 439–450.

Military offices
Preceded by František Zach	Chief of the Serbian General Staff; Acting; 1877–1878	Succeeded by Kosta Protić; Acting
