= Nikola Begović =

Serbian writer and politician (1821–1895)

Nikola Begović (Begovići na Baniji, Austrian Empire, 1 December 1821 – Karlovac, Austria-Hungary, 20 April 1895) was a priest, religious teacher, poet and historian.

== Biography ==
Nikola Begović taught schools in Kostajnica, Sunja, and Plaški, where he was trained as a teacher at the Episcopal Clerical College. He was a teacher at the Serbian primary school in Kostajnica in 1842 and 1843. He was ordained a deacon in 1844, and the following year a priest. He was a parish priest in Petrinja, then in Perna (1857), and from 2 April 1862 to 28 April 1895 in the Serbian Orthodox Church of St. Nicholas in Karlovac. He taught religious education in Karlovac schools. He was also the spiritual teacher of Nikola Tesla, who during his high school education in Karlovac (1870–1873) was a regular in the Serbian Church of St. Nicholas.

He was also engaged in literary work, he did a lot in that field. He wrote several articles on the history of the people's church, then several popular articles on the Serbian Orthodox Church, Serbian church sermons ("Liturgy"), worked in the field of beautiful books in original and in translations, and sang songs. He collected "Folk Songs of the Krajina Serbs", and is considered to be one of the authors of the "Hymn to Saint Sava". He dealt with lexicographic and ethnographic issues.

The most significant works from history are "History of the Serbian Church" (Novi Sad 1874) and "Life and customs of Serb border guards" (Zagreb 1887).

Since 2008, Nova 9th Street in Busije, a suburb of Belgrade, was named after Nikola Begović.

== Political action ==
During his service in Perna (1856–1862), he was elected a Krajina representative in the Croatian Parliament in 1861. He was often arrested in Zagreb for his appearances and activities.

== Criticism ==
Manojlo Grbić criticizes Nikola Begović in the 3rd book "Karlovac Bishopric" (pp. 41–44). According to him, Begović slandered Bishop Mušicki for ordering the Orthodox to celebrate the Hungarian King St. Stephen. He reproached Begović for politically flattering Vienna and commemorating Roman Catholics as well, which he considered an inadmissible scandal in the Orthodox Church.

== Works ==
- "Biblical History of the Old and New Testaments and Apostolic Works Describing Palestine from Christ to Our Times", Zagreb 1852.
- "Serbian Catechisms based on the Synodal Catechism", Belgrade 1860.
- "Serbian sermons composed and spoken by Nikola Begović", Belgrade 1870.
- "History of the Serbian Church, attached to young Serbia", Novi Sad 1874; second edition: 1877.
- "Liturgy for Serbian schools and people", Biograd 1885.
- "Serbian folk songs from Lika and Banija", Zagreb 1885.
- "Life and customs of Serb border guards", Zagreb 1887.

== Literature ==
- Branko Krnjajić: "Lexicon of the Banija Serbs," Belgrade; and "Native Association of Banija, Descendants, and Friends of Banija" (2019). ISBN 978-86-81558-01-0.
- Rudolf Strohal: "The city of Karlovac is described and outlined," Karlovac (1906)

== Sources ==
- Nikola Begović Nikola Begović – srpski polihistor;
- "Serbian Diary", Novi Sad (1857);
- Orthodoxy, newspaper of the Serbian Patriarchate, Belgrade, number 1037;
- Dan Mrkić: "Nikola Tesla, European Years," Belgrade (2004);
- "Official Gazette of the City of Belgrade "02/2008;
- Diary of the Parliament of the Triune Kingdom of Dalmatia, Croatia, and Slavonia in 1861, Zagreb (1862).
