= Mile Novaković =

Serbian general

- Nickname: Pauk (The Spider)
- Born: 29 April 1950; Kirin, PR Croatia, Yugoslavia
- Died: 14 September 2015 (aged 65) Surduk, Serbia
- Allegiance: Republika Srpska; Serbian Krajina
- Rank: Major General (SVK); Major General (VJ)
- Conflicts: Bosnian War; Operation Corridor 92; Operation Spider; Croatian War; Operation Maslenica; Operation Medak Pocket; Operation Storm

Mile Novaković (Serbian Cyrillic: Миле Новаковић; 29 April 1950 – 14 September 2015) was a Croatian Serb major general active in the Serbian Army of Krajina and in the Armed Forces of FR Yugoslavia, during and after the Croatian War of Independence.

He was tried in absentia by a Croatian court in 1995 for war crimes, being sentenced to 20 years in jail. In 2003, another Yugoslav Army official was apprehended by Macedonian officials citing an Interpol warrant, as he tried to cross into the country. This man was released after the mistaken identity was discovered. The real Novaković remained at large in Serbia.

In 2010, Novaković testified at the trial of Momčilo Perišić at the International Criminal Tribunal for the former Yugoslavia. Perišić had previously promoted Novaković to the rank of Major General in the Armed Forces of FR Yugoslavia in 1993. Perišić was acquitted upon appeal of all charges on 28 February 2013.

== Death ==
Novaković suffered a heart attack on 14 September 2015 and died in the ambulance that was driving him from Surduk, where he lived, to the Military Medical Academy in Belgrade.

Military offices
New title Dissolution of Yugoslavia	Commander of the Serbian Army of Krajina; 27 November 1992 – 22 February 1994	Succeeded by Milan Čeleketić
