= Serbian Army of Krajina =

Serbian armed force, 1992–1995

- Српска Војска Крајине; Srpska Vojska Krajine
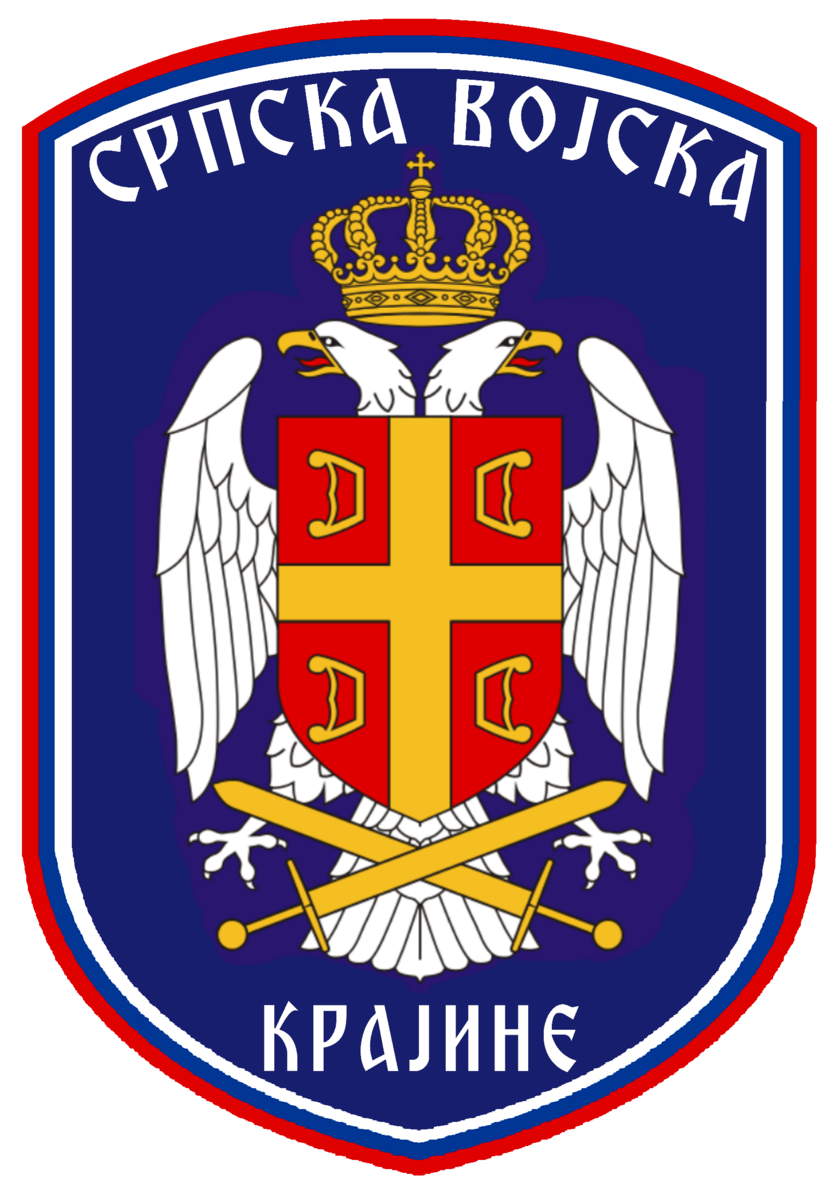
- Emblem of the Serbian Army of Krajina
- Military leaders: Mile Novaković; Milan Čeleketić; Mile Mrkšić
- Political leaders: Milan Babić; Goran Hadžić; Milan Martić
- Founded: October 17, 1992
- Dates active: 1992–1996
- Dissolved: 1996
- Allegiance: Serbian Krajina
- Headquarters: Knin
- Size: 30,000

The Serbian Army of Krajina (SAK, Serbo-Croatian: Srpska vojska Krajine, Српска војска Крајине, abbr. SVK), also known as the Army of the Republic of Serbian Krajina or Krajina Serbian Army, was the armed forces of the Republic of Serbian Krajina (RSK). The SVK consisted of ground and air elements.

Created through the merger of the Territorial Defense of the Republic of Serbian Krajina (TORSK), units of the Yugoslav People's Army (JNA) and the Krajina Militia, the SVK was officially established on 19 March 1992. Responsible for the security of the RSK, its area of responsibility covered an area of some 17,028 km² at its peak, as it was located entirely inland it thus had no naval forces. The SVK, along with the state of RSK, ceased to exist in 1995 following the Croatian military offensive Operation Storm.

== Personnel ==
At the creation of the army, it was planned that its number would be 80,000 people, however it turned out to be less.

- According to Colonel Kosta Novaković: 62,483 (772 officers, 2,709 non-commissioned officers and 59,002 soldiers) or 78% of the planned number.
- According to the General Staff in 1994: 62,805 (2,890 officers, 4,329 non-commissioned officers and 55,886 soldiers).
- According to General Milisav Sekulić: 71,409 (3,291 officers, 3,424 non-commissioned officers and 60,496 soldiers).

== Organization ==
The wartime organization of the Serbian Army of Krajina was structured around a centralized Main Staff that commanded several strategic support units and seven operational corps. As detailed in military documentation, the established order of battle was as follows:

=== Main Staff of the Serbian Army of Krajina ===
- 105th Aviation Brigade
- 44th Air Defense Rocket Brigade
- 75th Mixed Artillery Brigade
- 2nd Guards Motorized Brigade

=== Corps ===
- Special Forces Corps – Slunj
- 7th North Dalmatian Corps – Knin
- 15th Lika Corps – Korenica
- 21st Kordun Corps – Vojnić
- 39th Banija Corps – Petrinja
- 18th Western Slavonian Corps – Okučani
- 11th Eastern Slavonian Corps – Borovo Selo

== Equipment ==
=== Vehicles ===
In 1995, the International Institute for Strategic Studies (IISS) estimated that the SVK had a total of 250 tanks and 100 armoured personnel carriers.

Name	Type	Origin	Notes
Tanks
T-34	Medium tank	Soviet Union	
T-55	Main battle tank	Soviet Union	
M-84	Main battle tank	Yugoslavia	~30
Armoured fighting vehicles
BVP M-80	Infantry fighting vehicle	Yugoslavia	
OT M-60	Armoured personnel carrier	Yugoslavia	M-60P variant used.
Armoured trains
Krajina Express	Armoured train	Republic of Serbian Krajina	

=== Artillery ===
In 1995, the IISS estimated that the SVK had a total of 200 pieces of artillery of varied calibers, 14 multiple rocket launchers, and an unknown number of 81 mm, 82 mm, and 120 mm mortars.

Name	Type	Origin	Caliber	Notes
Towed artillery
76 mm divisional gun M1942 (ZiS-3)	Field gun	Soviet Union	76 mm	
M-56 Howitzer	Howitzer	Yugoslavia	105 mm	
122 mm howitzer 2A18 (D-30)	Howitzer	Soviet Union	122 mm	
122 mm gun M1931/37 (A-19)	Field gun	Soviet Union	122 mm	
130 mm towed field gun M1954 (M-46)	Field gun	Soviet Union	130 mm	
M-65 Howitzer	Howitzer	Yugoslavia	155 mm	Yugoslav copy of the M114 155 mm howitzer.
Multiple rocket launchers
M-63 Plamen	Multiple rocket launcher	Yugoslavia	128 mm	

=== Anti-tank ===
Name	Type	Origin	Caliber	Notes
Anti-tank missiles
9M14 Malyutka	Anti-tank guided missile	Soviet Union	125 mm	Also mounted on BOV-1s.
Recoilless guns
M60	Recoilless gun	Yugoslavia	82 mm	
M65	Recoilless gun	Yugoslavia	105 mm	
Anti-tank guns
MT-12	Anti-tank gun	Soviet Union	100 mm	30 in service in 1995.

=== Aircraft ===
In 1995, the IISS estimated that the SVK had 16 fixed-wing combat aircraft and 9 helicopters in service.

Name	Type	Origin	Notes
Fixed-wing aircraft
SOKO G-2 Galeb	Trainer / Light attack	Yugoslavia	
SOKO J-22 Orao	Attack	Yugoslavia	
Helicopters
SOKO Gazelle	Utility	Yugoslavia	License-built version of the Aérospatiale Gazelle.
Mil Mi-8	Transport	Soviet Union	

=== Air defence ===
Name	Type	Origin	Caliber	Notes
Anti-aircraft guns
Zastava M55	Anti-aircraft gun	Yugoslavia	20 mm	The M75 variant was also used.
M-53/59 Praga	Self-propelled anti-aircraft gun	Czechoslovakia	30 mm	
ZSU-57-2	Self-propelled anti-aircraft gun	Soviet Union	57 mm	

=== Gallery ===
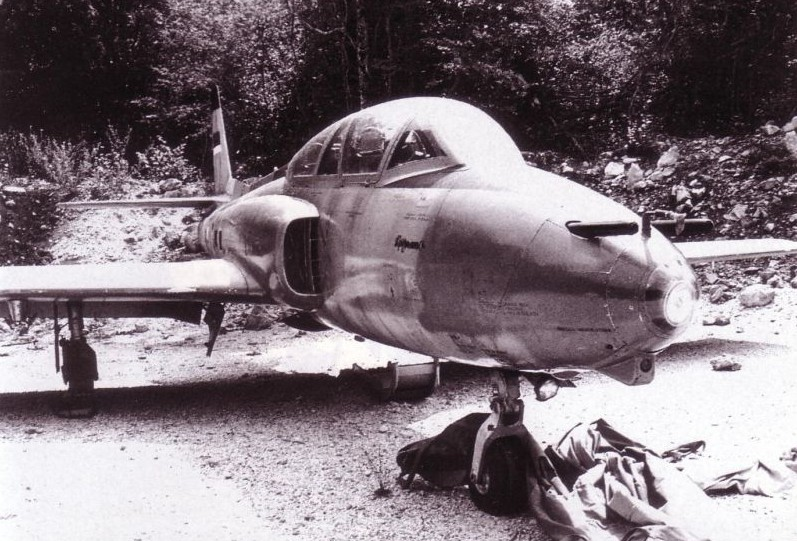
Krajina Airforce G-2 Galeb

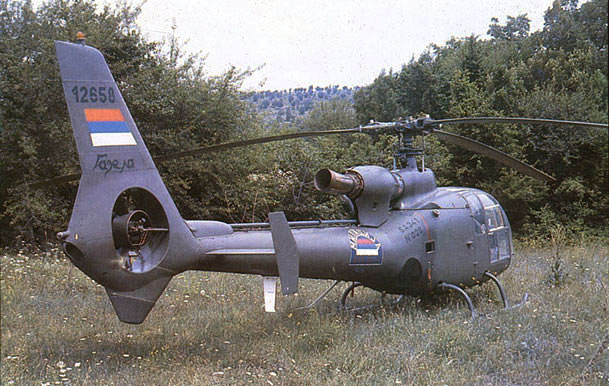
Krajina Airforce Aérospatiale Gazelle

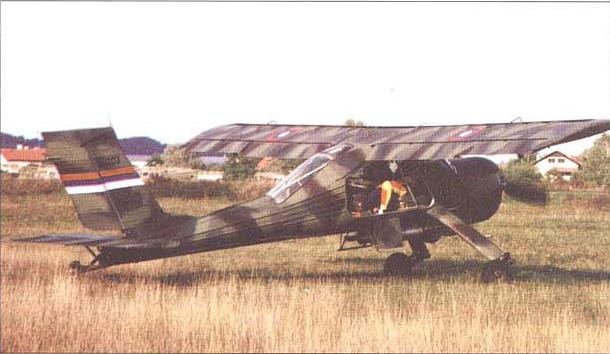
Krajina Airforce Utva 66

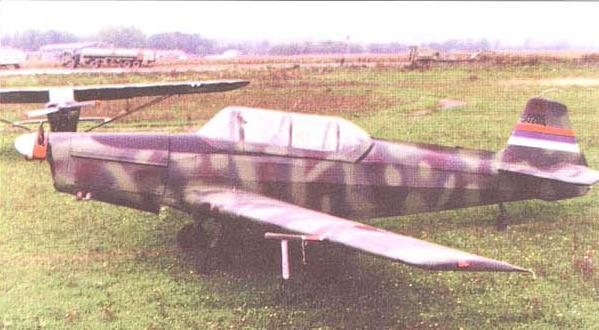
Krajina Airforce Zlin Z-526

== War crimes ==
During the Croatian War of Independence, numerous massacres were conducted by the Army of Serbian Krajina. On 2–3 May 1995, seven civilians were killed and many more injured in the Zagreb rocket attacks.

The main leaders of the Serbian Army of Krajina, Milan Martić, Milan Babić and Goran Hadžić, were indicted and trialled by the ICTY for various war crimes and crimes against humanity. Milan Martić was sentenced to 35 years in prison, Milan Babić was sentenced to 13 years, while Goran Hadžić died shortly after their trial started.

== See also ==
- Army of Republika Srpska

== Sources ==
- International Institute for Strategic Studies (1995). The Military Balance 1995-1996. Oxford University Press. ISBN 978-0-19-828055-2.
- Vrcelj, Marko (2002). Rat za Srpsku Krajinu: 1991-1995. Zora. ISBN 9788683809066.
- Novaković, Kosta (2009). Srpska krajina: usponi, padovi, uzdizanja. Zora. ISBN 978-86-83809-54-7.
- "The Army of Serbian Krajina", Jane's Intelligence Review, 1 October 1993
- Central Intelligence Agency, Office of Russian and European Analysis (2002). Balkan Battlegrounds: A Military History of the Yugoslav Conflict, 1990–1995. Washington, D.C.: Central Intelligence Agency. ISBN 978-0160664724. OCLC 50396958.
