= Petrović =

Petrović (Serbian Cyrillic: Петровић, pronounced [pětroʋitɕ];) is a South Slavic language patronymic surname literally meaning Peter's son, equivalent to the English last name of Peterson. In Eastern Slavic naming customs its counterpart is "Petrovich".

The surname was notably used by the House of Petrović-Njegoš, and by Karađorđe Petrović.

Petrović is the second most frequent surname in Serbia. It is also the 11th most common in Croatia, with 9,614 carriers (2011 census). It is the third most common surname in the Osijek-Baranja County, the fourth most common in the Primorje-Gorski Kotar County and ninth most common in the City of Zagreb.

== Notable people ==
- Aleksandar Petrović (footballer, born 1914) (1914–87), former Serbian football player and manager
- Aleksandar Petrović (film director) (1929–1994), Serbian film director
- Aleksandar Petrović (basketball, born February 1959), Croatian professional basketball coach and former player
- Aleksandar Petrović (basketball, born October 1959) (1959–2014), Serbian professional basketball coach
- Aleksandar Petrović (basketball, born 1972), Macedonian professional basketball coach
- Aleksandar Petrović (basketball, born 1987), Serbian professional basketball player
- Aleksandar Petrović (footballer, born 1983) (born 1983), Serbian professional football right-back currently playing for FK Čukarički Stankom in the Serbian SuperLiga
- Aleksandar Petrović (footballer, born 1985) (born 1985), Serbian footballer currently playing for Serbian SuperLiga club FK Rad Belgrade
- Aleksandar R. Petrović (born 1985), Serbian footballer who recently played for Hajduk Kula
- Aleksandro Petrović (born 1988), Bosnian/German footballer
- Alex Petrovic (born 1992), Canadian ice-hockey player
- Biljana Petrović (born 1961), Serbian high jumper
- Boško Petrović (disambiguation), multiple people
- Branimir Petrović (born 1982), Serbian footballer
- Danilo II Petrović-Njegoš (1826–60), Serbian Prince
- Danilo Petrović (tennis) (born 1992), Serbian tennis player
- Đorđe Petrović (born 1999), Serbian football goalkeeper currently playing for Bournemouth
- Draško Petrović (born 1965), current CEO of Telekom Srbija
- Dražen Petrović (1964–93), Croatian basketball player
- Dušan Petrović (born 1966), Serbian politician
- Goran Petrović (born 1961), Serbian writer
- Jovana Petrović (born 2001), Serbian women's football goalkeeper
- Karađorđe Petrović (1768–1817), leader of the first Serbian uprising
- Leo Petrović (1883–1945), Herzegovinian Croat historian
- Ljupko Petrović (born 1947), Serbian football coach
- Madeleine Petrovic (born 1956), Austrian politician
- Mihailo Petrović (disambiguation), several people
- Milovan Petrović (born 1990), Macedonian footballer
- Miodrag "Čkalja" Petrović (1924–2003), Serbian actor
- Mirko Petrović (politician) (born 1965), Serbian politician and current CEO of Dunav osiguranje
- Nadja Petrovic (born 1991), Macedonian painter
- Nataša Petrović (born 1988), Macedonian actress of Serbian descent
- Nenad Petrović (chess composer) (1907–89), Croatian chess problemist
- Nenad Petrović (writer) (1925–2014), Serbian writer
- Nikola I Petrović-Njegoš (1841–1921), Prince of Montenegro
- Ognjen "Olja" Petrović (1948–2000), Serbian goalkeeper (football)
- Petar I Petrović-Njegoš (1747–1830), Prince-Bishop
- Petar II Petrović-Njegoš (1813–51), Prince-Bishop
- Radič Petrović (1738–1816), Serbian Revolutionary
- Radosav Petrović (born 1989), Serbian footballer
- Roman Petrović (1896–1947), Bosnian expressionist painter
- Saša Petrović (actor) (born 1962), Bosnian actor
- Saša Petrović (footballer) (born 1966), former Montenegrin football goalkeeper
- Sava II Petrović-Njegoš (1702–82), Prince-Bishop of Montenegro
- Sava Petrović (botanist) (1839–1889), botanist
- Stanojlo Petrović(1813–1894) Serbian high-ranking officer and public benefactor
- Hajduk Veljko Petrović (c. 1780–1813), known simply as Hajduk-Veljko, one of the vojvodas of the Serbian Revolutionary forces in the First Serbian Uprising against the Ottoman Empire
- Veljko Petrović (poet) (1884–1967), Serbian poet
- Vladimir "Pižon" Petrović (born 1955), Serbian footballer and coach
- Vladimir Petrović (footballer, born 1972) (born 1972), Croatian footballer
- William Francis Petrovic (1913–1991), naval engineer and ship builder
- Željko Petrović (born 1965), Montenegrin footballer and current coach
- Zoran Petrović (referee) (born 1952), Serbian football referee
- Zoran Petrović (writer) (1954–2018), Serbian writer

== See also ==
- House of Petrović-Njegoš
- Ninth Belgrade Gymnasium "Mihailo Petrović-Alas", high school in Belgrade, Serbia.
