= Queen's Astoria Design Hotel =

Hotels in Belgrade, Serbia

- Interactive map of the Queen's Astoria Design Hotel area
- Former names: Hotel Astoria (1937–2009)

General information
- Location: Savski Venac, Belgrade, Serbia, 1 Milovana Milovanovića Street; Belgrade 11000
- Coordinates: 44.809121°N 20.4552983°E
- Opening: 1937; 89 years ago

Technical details
- Floor count: 5

Design and construction
- Architect: Ivan Savković

Other information
- Number of rooms: 85

Website
- www.astoria.rs

Queen's Astoria Design Hotel (originally known as Hotel Astoria) is a four star hotel located in Belgrade, the capital of Serbia.

== History ==
Hotel Astoria's mid 1930s construction was financed by Đurđe S. Ninković, owner of various hospitality properties around the city of Belgrade, such as the Branislav Kojić-designed Hotel Pošta that had opened in 1930 on the opposite end of the Sava Square. For Hotel Astoria, which was envisioned as a bigger hotel, Ninković commissioned the building design to his own son-in-law, architect Ivan Savković who later, in 1950, went on to co-design the post-World War II building at 14 King Milan Street that housed the PR Serbia Assembly. The newly built hotel opened in 1937 and became one of the first modernist buildings in Belgrade with Streamline Moderne elements, applying a minimalist façade design and relying on simple geometric lines rather than ornate decorations. The building has since been given the status as a significant architectural milestone in Serbian architecture.

Basing its business model on the increasing amount of business travel in the Kingdom of Yugoslavia's developing economy, the hotel was a family-run enterprise with approximately 80 guest rooms, a restaurant, bar, and purpose-built architect's studio for the owner Ninković's son-in-law, architect Savković. The hotel stretches over 3,600m^{2} and is located in central Belgrade next to the main railway station.

Đurđe S. Ninković died in November 1940, at which point his wife Jelena, son Milorad Ninković, and daughter Nina Savković inherited the hotel and continued running the business.

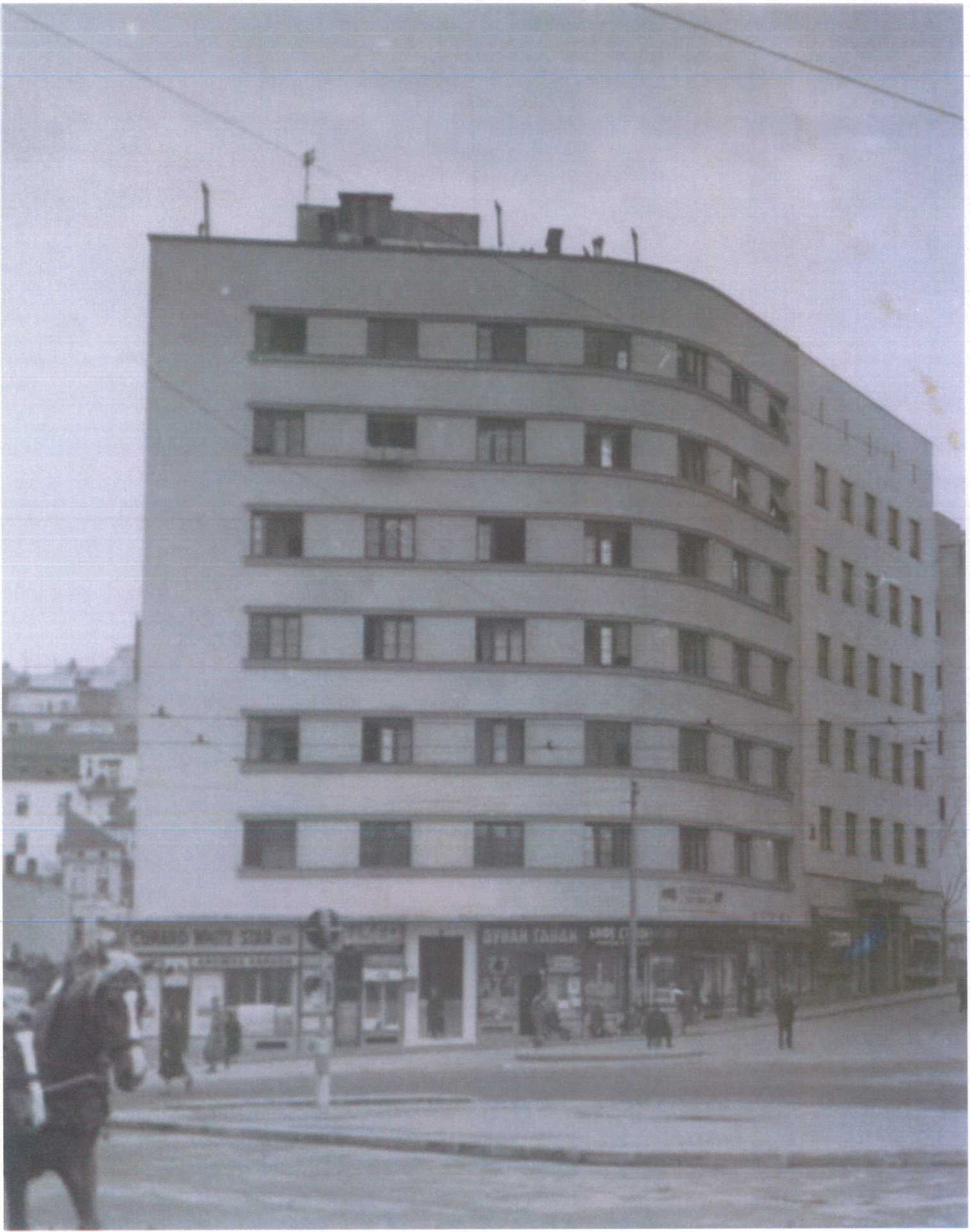
Hotel Astoria in 1938 (second building on the right) as seen from the Sava Square.

With the Nazi German invasion of the Yugoslav kingdom on 6 April 1941, the hotel was confiscated and used for Wehrmacht's military purposes. At the end of the war, the Ninković-Savković family got the hotel back, albeit briefly.

At the end of World War II, the hotel was nationalized in the newly established, communist-run FPR Yugoslavia. The state (including its successor states) ran the hotel through a state-owned entity DHUTP Astoria for the following sixty years, officially having the legal status of a socially owned concern, with a member of OZNA showing up at the premises and informing the owners, members of Ninković and Savković families, that they won't be living there any longer.

=== 2009 re-privatization ===
In March 2009, with the Serbian government privatization agency's announcement of a tender auction in order to re-privatize Hotel Astoria, the original pre-nationalization owners, members of the Ninković family, staged a protest by symbolically occupying the property, entering it on 3 March at 11am. Led by Đurđe Ninković, son of the hotel's owner Milorad Ninković, they occupied the hotel from March 3rd until March 30th employing the principles of direct action, unhappy at seeing the family property sold by the Serbian government without having passed a denationalization law or a restitution law for property seized by the FPR/SFR Yugoslavia communist regime. Instead, the government based the tender auction on the current privatization law, setting the hotel's initial price at €1.2 million.

The hotel occupation received significant media coverage, contributing to the public debate regarding the Serbian government's failure to compensate owners for property forcibly seized by the communists.

Regardless, the tender auction went ahead as planned on 6 March and the hotel got re-privatized via Serbian government privatization agency selling it for RSD230 million (~€2.4 million) to the Mladenovac-based company Progres a.d. and the Podgorica-based company Montenegro Premier. Under the purchasing agreement, the new owner also took on an obligation of investing RSD61.6 million into the property.

On 9 March, the Politika daily published an op-ed commentary by Đurđe Ninković who disputed the Serbian government's inherited legal basis to handle Hotel Astoria, invoking a communist era law ('law on nationalization of leased buildings and construction land for commercial exploitation') that came into effect on 1 January 1959. Among other things, he stated: "I invite everyone to try and derive their own conclusion about the fairness, legality, and finally, the price of the accepted bid at the auction that took place this past Friday. I only want to say that the hotel owners, represented by myself, would've never sold the hotel at that price. I remind everyone that Hotel Astoria was unlawfully nationalized and that the state never had a legal basis to make decisions about the hotel. Furthermore, all deadlines for the compensation payout because of nationalization are long overdue, and the last legally-set 50-year nationalization payout deadline expired on 1 January 2009 and since the state never paid the compensation in that timeframe it therefore forfeited the right to own that property, which it acquired illegally in the first place.... There are ongoing court cases in front of the Municipal Court and the Supreme Court. I'm going to invest all of my skill and experience, obtained over the 40 years of practicing law in Belgrade and London, in order to see justice done at those court cases by obtaining a court decision confirming the right of the Ninković family to run Hotel Astoria".

The new owner closed Hotel Astoria in July 2009 for renovations. In late November 2010, it re-opened under a new name, Queen's Astoria Design Hotel. The hotel is still subject to a number of pending court cases disputing ownership.

== Historical significance ==
Hotel Astoria played a role in the development of democracy in Serbia, as it was the place where the Founding Committee of the Democratic Party held meetings in the law office of Mr Ninkovic (which the family had retained for use within the hotel building after nationalization) from the end of December 1989, in preparation for the re-establishment of the Democratic Party (DS). It was also the site where the Democratic Party's first political program was published in January 1990, and the site of the preparations for founding party conference held in February of that year. Following the founding party conference, the Democratic Party had its first central office in the hotel between February and October, 1990.

Mr Ninkovic's office in Hotel Astoria was also the home of the first central office of the Democratic Party of Serbia (DSS) for several months from July 1992, after a centre-right pro DEPOS coalition faction split from the Democratic Party to form the Democratic Party of Serbia (See Vox Iuris, December 2009).

== Location ==
Located at 1 Milovana Milovanovića Street, in the Belgrade municipality of Savski Venac, Queen's Astoria Design Hotel is in the near-vicinity of the city's Main Railway Station as well as its main bus terminal.
