= Ninković =

Ninković (Serbian Cyrillic: Нинковић) is a surname found in Serbia, Bosnia and Croatia, a patronymic derived from given name Ninko. It may refer to:

- Djurdje S. Ninković (1888–1940) businessman and hotelier in Belgrade, Kingdom of Yugoslavia
- Đurđe Ninković (born 1942), lawyer, legal commentator and founding member of the Democratic Party (DS) in Serbia
- Jovan Ninković (born 1987), Serbian professional football player who currently plays for Górnik Łęczna
- Milica Ninković (1854–1881), Serbian feminist, journalist, and translator
- Miloš Ninković (born 1984), Serbian footballer playing for Western Sydney Wanderers FC, with shirt number 10
- Nataša Ninković (born 1972), Serbian actress, best known for her roles in the films Savior, War Live, The Professional and The Trap
- Nikola Ninković (born 1994), Serbian football midfielder who plays for Serbian SuperLiga club FK Partizan
- Ratko Ninković (born 1967), football manager and former player from Bosnia-Herzegovina
- Slobodan Ninković (born 1956), Serbian actor
- Sreten Ninković (born 1972), Serbian long-distance runner

== See also ==
- Rob Ninkovich (born 1984), an American football player
- Nonković
