= Pravdić =

Pravdić (Serbian Cyrillic: Правдић) is a surname. Notable people with the surname include:

- Aleksandar Pravdić (born 1958), Serbian politician
- Vlado Pravdić (1949–2023), Bosnian musician

== See also ==
- Pravdica
