= Đurđe Ninković =

Serbian lawyer, legal commentator and political activist

Deputy Minister of Justice
- In office February 2001 – November 2001
- Preceded by: Zoran Balinovac
- Succeeded by: Dušan Protić

Personal details
- Born: 1942 (age 83–84) Belgrade, Serbia, Kingdom of Yugoslavia
- Party: Democratic (DS) Founding Member (December 1989 - July 1992); Democratic Party of Serbia (DSS) Founding Member (July 1992 - May 2007)

Đurđe Ninković (born 1942) is a Serbian lawyer, legal commentator and political activist who was a founding member of the Democratic Party (DS) in Serbia who joined the Founding Committee of the Democratic Party in December 1989.

From late December 1989, the meetings of the Founding Committee and later the Executive Committee of the DS, took place in his law offices in Belgrade where the Pismo o namerama (Letter of intent), the first party political program of the DS, was drafted and published in January 1990. At this time the central office of the DS was also located in Mr. Ninković's law offices in hotel Astoria for a few months.

== Biography ==
Djurdje was brought up in a pro-democracy family where both his parents were opponents of communist totalitarianism. His father, Milorad Dj. Ninković, was a cavalry officer in the Royal Yugoslav Army and a prominent lawyer educated in France and Kingdom of Yugoslavia, who was imprisoned and persecuted after the communist government was established in Yugoslavia in 1944 and his mother, Višnja (née Popović), also studied law at the University of Belgrade. They both believed in individual human rights and the rule of law which were trampled by the communist revolution. This influenced Djurdje in his belief that for Serbia to move forward it was first necessary to fully dismantle the legacy of communism.

He graduated from Belgrade Law School in 1964 and completed his post-graduate studies at the University of London in 1968. He is a Salzburg Global Fellow, being an alumnus of the Salzburg Global Seminar course in American Law and Legal Institutions of 1977 and is also an alumnus of the Kokkalis Program at Harvard Kennedy School, Executive Education leadership course (2000), having been awarded a Kokkalis Foundation scholarship.

He is the author of more than seventy legal articles on various topics, particularly focused on ownership of private property, restitution, rehabilitation of political prisoners, the rule of law and independence of the judiciary in various legal journals.

== Political life ==
Djurdje was a member of the Founding Committee of the Democratic Party from late December 1989. He was elected Secretary of the Executive Committee, at the founding party conference in February 1990 and was an elected member of the General and Executive Committees of the Democratic Party until July 1992. In 1990 he was also a founding Director of the Democratic Party opposition newspaper Demokratija.

He left the DS with the pro-DEPOS coalition wing of the party and was a founding member of the Democratic Party of Serbia (DSS) in July 1992 with Vojislav Koštunica, Vladeta Janković, Mirko Petrović, Draško Petrović, Vladan Batić and others. Initially, for the first few months, the administrative central office of the DSS was also located in his law offices in hotel Astoria. He was elected to the DSS' General Committee at the founding party conference.

Both within the DS and DSS he was concerned with establishing a democratic system in Serbia premised on the rule of law with a strong independent judiciary and a government of just laws, underpinned by four laws: The law of restitution of property forcibly nationalised by the communist regime without compensation; the Law of privatisation; the Law of rehabilitation of political prisoners; and the Law of lustration, effectively barring those individuals who had been instrumental in the abuse of human rights under communism from holding public office for a period of years.

In 2001, he was appointed Deputy Minister of Justice in the Cabinet of Serbia led by Zoran Đinđić, the Prime Minister. He chaired various government expert working groups drafting democratic laws to underpin the post-communist civil society, including laws regulating non-governmental organisations (NGOs), political parties and the judiciary.

After leaving office he remained involved as a legal expert within government working groups preparing draft legislation as the deputy chairman of the working group preparing the draft law on restitution of confiscated church property (adopted by Parliament in 2006).

He was also the chairman of the working group preparing the draft law on restitution of nationalised and confiscated property in 2001 (which was based on the premise of restitutio in rem (return of the original property ), and was a member of working groups preparing the law on Rehabilitation of political prisoners (adopted by Parliament in 2005) and the law on registration and evidencing of nationalised/confiscated property (adopted by Parliament in 2005). He also campaigned for the adoption of legislation on lustration of communist apparatchiks especially within the government, judiciary and the police (such laws having been adopted in post-communist countries including Poland, Czech Republic and Hungary).

Since 2006 he is no longer involved in party politics having experienced a continuing lack of political will for genuine deep rooted political reforms.

In 2009 he actively campaigned for the immediate adoption of a just Law of restitution of nationalised and confiscated property, which is a condition of Serbia's potential membership of the EU. His campaign included a direct action occupation of hotel Astoria which had been built by his grandfather, Djurdje S. Ninković, and owned by his family until forceful nationalisation by the Communist regime in 1948.

== Views ==
He has been very critical of The Law of Restitution of Property and Compensation, which was enacted by the Government of Serbia in October 2011 and implemented from March 2012. The law imposes severe restrictions on the type of property which can be returned. This will result in a very small proportion of nationalised property being returned to their rightful owners. It also imposes an absolute cap of EUR 2 billion for the total amount of compensation which can be paid to those owners whose property will not be returned. This represents a small fraction of the total value of property which has been nationalised estimated at between EUR 220 billion and EUR 50 billion.

== Awards and honours ==
- 2017: Appointed Member of the Privy Council by HRH Crown Prince Alexander Karađorđević of Serbia
- 2017: Knight Grand Cross of the Royal Order of the White Eagle
- 1988: Knight of the Order of the Polar Star by HM King Carl XVI Gustaf of Sweden, for legal services as long standing Counsel to the Swedish Embassy in Belgrade.

Political offices
| Preceded by Zoran Balinovac | Deputy Minister of Justice of Serbia; 2001 (February–November) | Succeeded by Dušan Protić |
