= Mirko Petrović =

Mirko Petrović is the name of:

- Mirko Petrović-Njegoš (1820-1867), Montenegrin military commander, diplomat and poet of the House of Petrović-Njegoš
- Mirko Petrović-Njegoš (prince) (1867-1918), Montenegrin prince
- Mirko Petrović (politician) (born 1965), Serbian politician and businessman
- Mirko Petrović (athlete) (born 1981), Serbian long-distance runner, see 2008 European Cup (athletics)
