= Sarajevo days in Belgrade =

Sarajevo days in Belgrade (Serbo-Croatian:Dani Sarajeva/Дани Сарајева) a multi-day cultural event that is organized annually in the Serbian capital Belgrade in memory of the Siege of Sarajevo. The festival was launched in 2007 by NGOs from Belgrade and Sarajevo, led by the regional Youth Initiative for Human Rights, with the goal of fostering closer cultural ties between the two cities.

Since its inception, the Yugoslav Drama Theatre has participated in the organization of the festival.

== See also ==
- Siege of Sarajevo
- Serbian culture
- Culture of Bosnia and Herzegovina
- Culture in Belgrade
