= Uroš Janković =

Serbian politician

Uroš Janković (Serbian Cyrillic: Урош Јанковић; born 24 September 1979) is a politician in Serbia. He was the deputy mayor of the Belgrade municipality of Čukarica from 2012 to 2014. He was convicted of fraud in 2019, although this conviction was overturned the following year and a new trial ordered. Janković is a member of the Democratic Party of Serbia (Demokratska stranka Srbije, DSS).

== Early life and private career ==
Janković was born in Belgrade, in what was then the Socialist Republic of Serbia in the Socialist Federal Republic of Yugoslavia. He was raised in Banovo Brdo in Čukarica and graduated from the Business School of Vocational Studies in Belgrade. He participated in military service in Kosovo and Metohija in 1998–99, during the period of the Kosovo War. After returning to Belgrade, he founded a production company.

== Politician ==
Janković appeared on the DSS's electoral list for the Čukarica municipal assembly in the 2008 Serbian local elections, receiving the eighteenth position. The list won five mandates, and he was not selected for a mandate when the new assembly met. (From 2000 to 2011, mandates in Serbian elections were awarded to successful parties or coalitions rather than individual candidates, and it was common practice for the mandates to be assigned out of numerical order. Janković could have been given a mandate despite his list position.)

Serbia's electoral system was reformed in 2012, such that mandates were awarded in numerical order to candidates on successful lists. Janković held the lead position on the DSS's list for Čukarica in the 2012 local elections and was elected when the list won six mandates. The DSS formed a local coalition government with the Democratic Party (Demokratska stranka, DS) following the election, and Janković was appointed as deputy mayor. He served in this role for two years. He also served as president of the DSS's Belgrade city board during this time, and in July 2015 he announced that seven DSS members of the City Assembly of Belgrade had been expelled after forming an independent faction (which subsequently became the Independent Democratic Party of Serbia).

The DSS contested the 2016 Serbian local elections in an alliance with Dveri. Janković again appeared in the lead position on their list in Čukarica and was re-elected when the list won four mandates. He also appeared in the twenty-fourth position on the DSS–Dveri list in the concurrent 2016 Serbian parliamentary election and was not elected when the list won thirteen mandates. In late 2016, he justified the expulsion of former DSS leader Sanda Rašković Ivić from the party; Rašković Ivić had previously criticized local branches of the DSS that had made coalition deals with the Progressives, a statement that is said to have irritated Janković.

Janković was arrested on 7 November 2016 on charges of fraud. It was alleged that he and six others sold land in Makiško polje that they did not own to Serbian national football player Vladimir Stojković, who was said to have lost 245,000 Euros via the deals. Janković denied the charges. The DSS issued a statement following his arrest, saying that it hoped the judicial process would be professional and fair despite what it described as "the shaken trust in the work of judicial bodies."

He was convicted in December 2019 of fraud in complicity and sentenced to a two-year prison term and a fine. This verdict was overturned in November 2020 and a new trial ordered.

Prior to his arrest, it was speculated that Janković would run for DSS leader. He is currently the president of its executive board.
