= Culture in Belgrade =

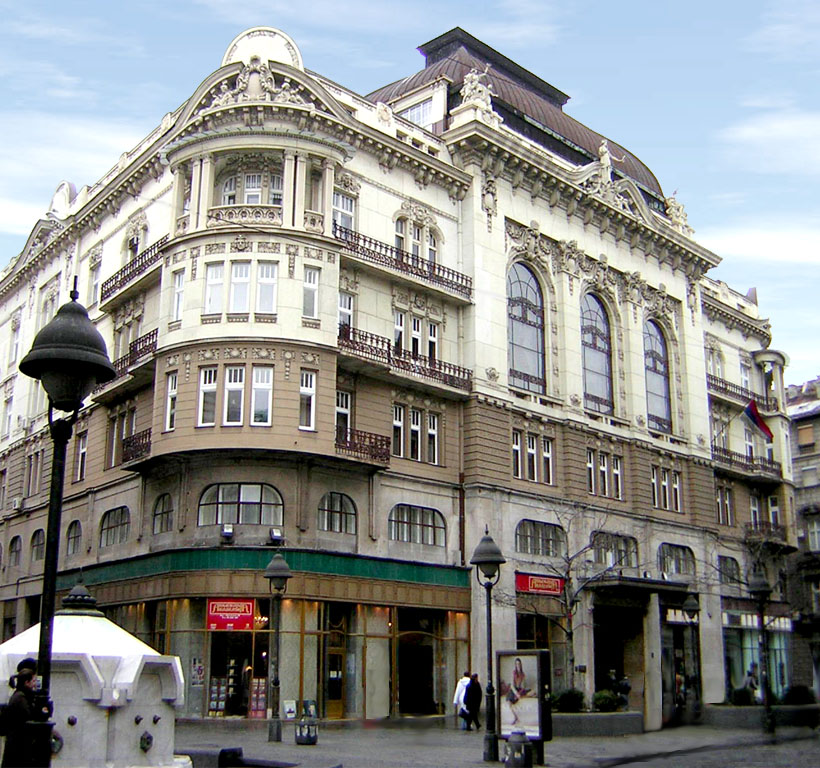
The Serbian Academy of Sciences and Arts (SANU) building in Knez Mihailova Street, Belgrade

The Culture in Belgrade encompasses a rich and diverse heritage shaped by centuries of historical, social, and geographical influences that have defined the cultural identity of Serbia's capital. As a centuries-old crossroads of civilizations, Belgrade hosts many significant cultural events, including FEST (International Film Festival), BITEF (Belgrade International Theatre Festival), BELEF (Belgrade Summer Festival), BEMUS (Belgrade Music Festival), the Belgrade Book Fair, and the Belgrade Beer Fest. The city has been and remains a home and inspiration to many prominent artists, writers, and scientists, and its numerous cultural institutions, galleries, museums, theatres, and libraries make it a vital cultural hub of Southeastern Europe.

== Historical development of culture in Belgrade ==
The cultural history of Belgrade dates back to antiquity, when the Roman city and military camp of Singidunum existed on its site. Traces of Roman culture are visible in archaeological findings. During the Middle Ages, Belgrade was an important strategic fortification on the border of various empires (Byzantine, Frankish, Bulgarian, Hungarian) and Serbian states. In the medieval period, particularly during the Serbian Despotate under Despot Stefan Lazarević in the early 15th century, Belgrade became the capital and experienced a significant cultural upswing, with strong fortifications, courtly life, and scribal activities.

Centuries of Ottoman rule (from 1521, with interruptions) brought Oriental influences to the city's architecture, urban planning, crafts, and way of life. Mosques, hammams, and caravanserai were built. Simultaneously, the Christian, primarily Serbian, population persisted in the city with its religious and cultural life, albeit under difficult conditions.

With the restoration of Serbian statehood in the 19th century, Belgrade once again became the capital (first of the Principality of Serbia, then the Kingdom of Serbia) and began its rapid development into the political, economic, and cultural center of Serbia. Key national institutions were founded, such as the National Theatre (1868), the National Museum of Serbia (1844), the Great School (Velika škola) (1808, predecessor to the University of Belgrade), the Serbian Royal Academy (1886, today SANU – Serbian Academy of Sciences and Arts), and the National Library of Serbia. The city became a hub for literary, artistic, and scientific life.

In the 20th century, as the capital of the Kingdom of Yugoslavia and later the Socialist Federal Republic of Yugoslavia, Belgrade further developed as a multicultural center and one of the most important cultural hubs in Southeastern Europe. This period saw significant achievements in all fields of art, the establishment of new institutions, and the city becoming a host for international festivals. After the breakup of Yugoslavia and during the period of transition, Belgrade has continued to be a dynamic cultural center with a rich and diverse contemporary scene.

== Arts and architecture ==
=== Visual arts ===
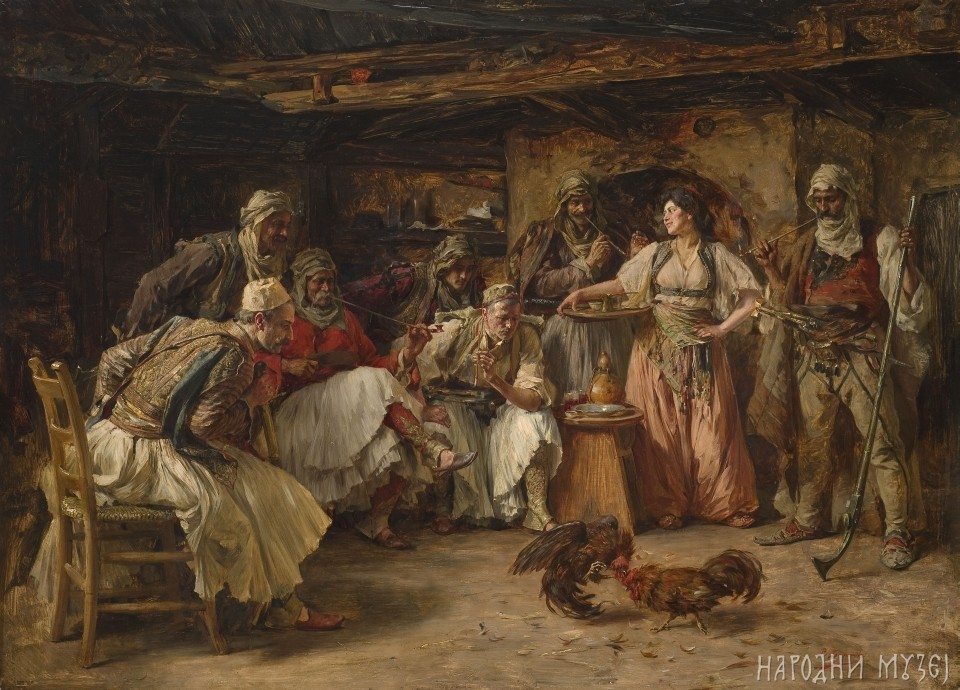
Paja Jovanović, "The Cock Fight" (c. 1897), oil on canvas

The visual arts scene in Belgrade reflects the broader trends of Serbian and European art. In the 19th century, artists such as Katarina Ivanović, Đura Jakšić (also a prominent poet), and later Uroš Predić and Paja Jovanović (leading representatives of Academic Realism) left a significant mark, and their works form important parts of Belgrade's museum collections. The beginning of the 20th century brought the influences of Modernism. Nadežda Petrović is considered a founder of Serbian modern painting, introducing elements of Impressionism, Fauvism, and Expressionism. Sava Šumanović, though born in Šid, spent significant creative periods in Paris and Belgrade, moving through phases of Cubism and Poetic Realism.

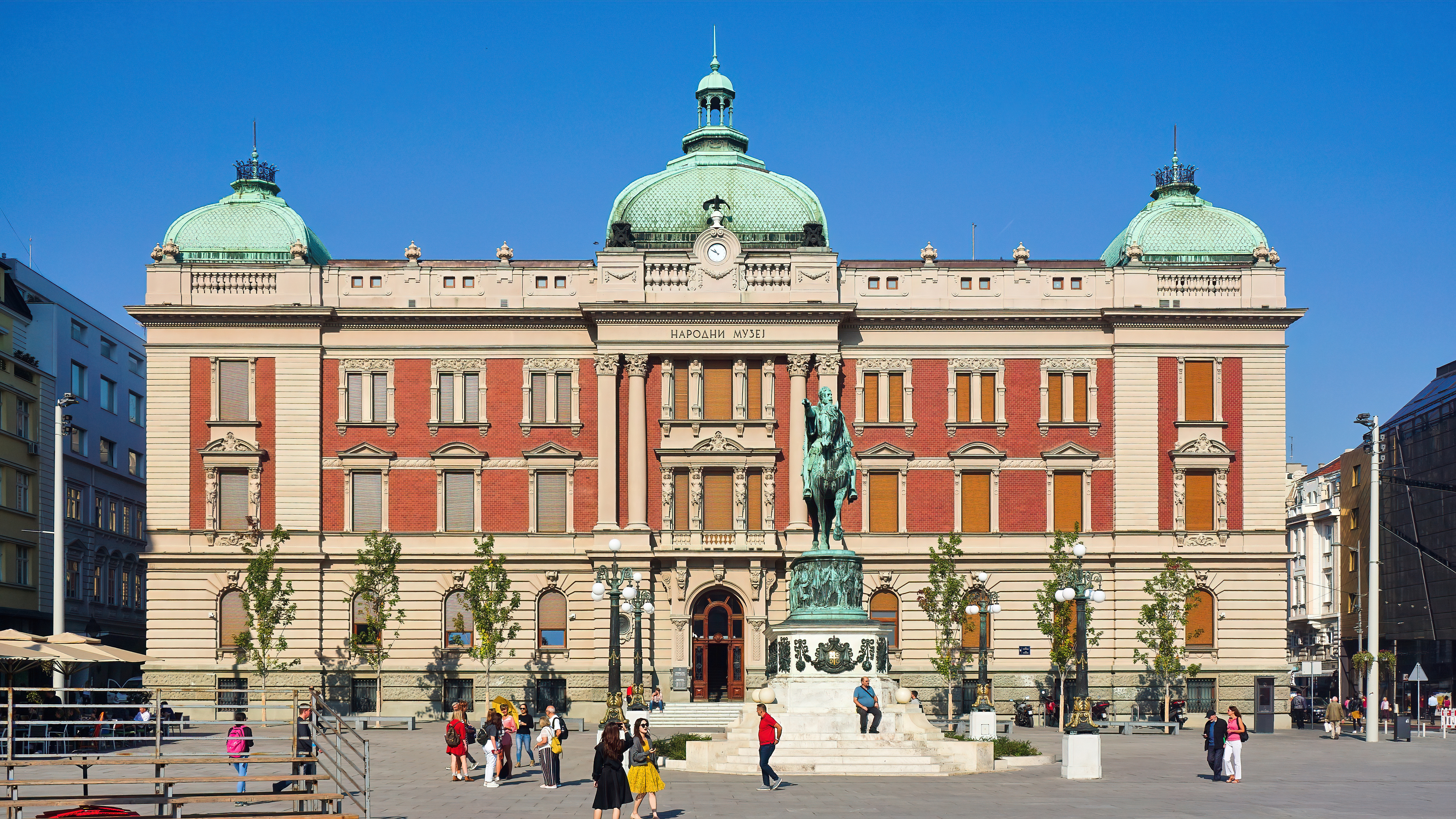
The National Museum of Serbia in Belgrade, guardian of a rich artistic heritage

The interwar period in Belgrade was marked by the activities of numerous artists and groups following avant-garde trends. After World War II, following a brief period of Socialist Realism, the Belgrade art scene opened up to abstract art (e.g., Petar Lubarda, whose 1951 exhibition marked a turning point), Art Informel, and later Conceptual art. Significant painters associated with Belgrade in the second half of the 20th century include Milan Konjović, Marko Čelebonović, Mića Popović, as well as internationally renowned artists Vladimir Veličković and Ljuba Popović.

Belgrade today is a center of contemporary visual arts, with numerous galleries exhibiting works by domestic and international artists. Among the most significant exhibition spaces are the Gallery of the Serbian Academy of Sciences and Arts (SANU Gallery), the Salon of the Museum of Contemporary Art, the Cvijeta Zuzorić Art Pavilion, the Gallery of the Cultural Centre of Belgrade, the Gallery of the Youth Centre, and the Gallery of the Student Cultural Centre, as well as many private galleries.

=== Architecture ===
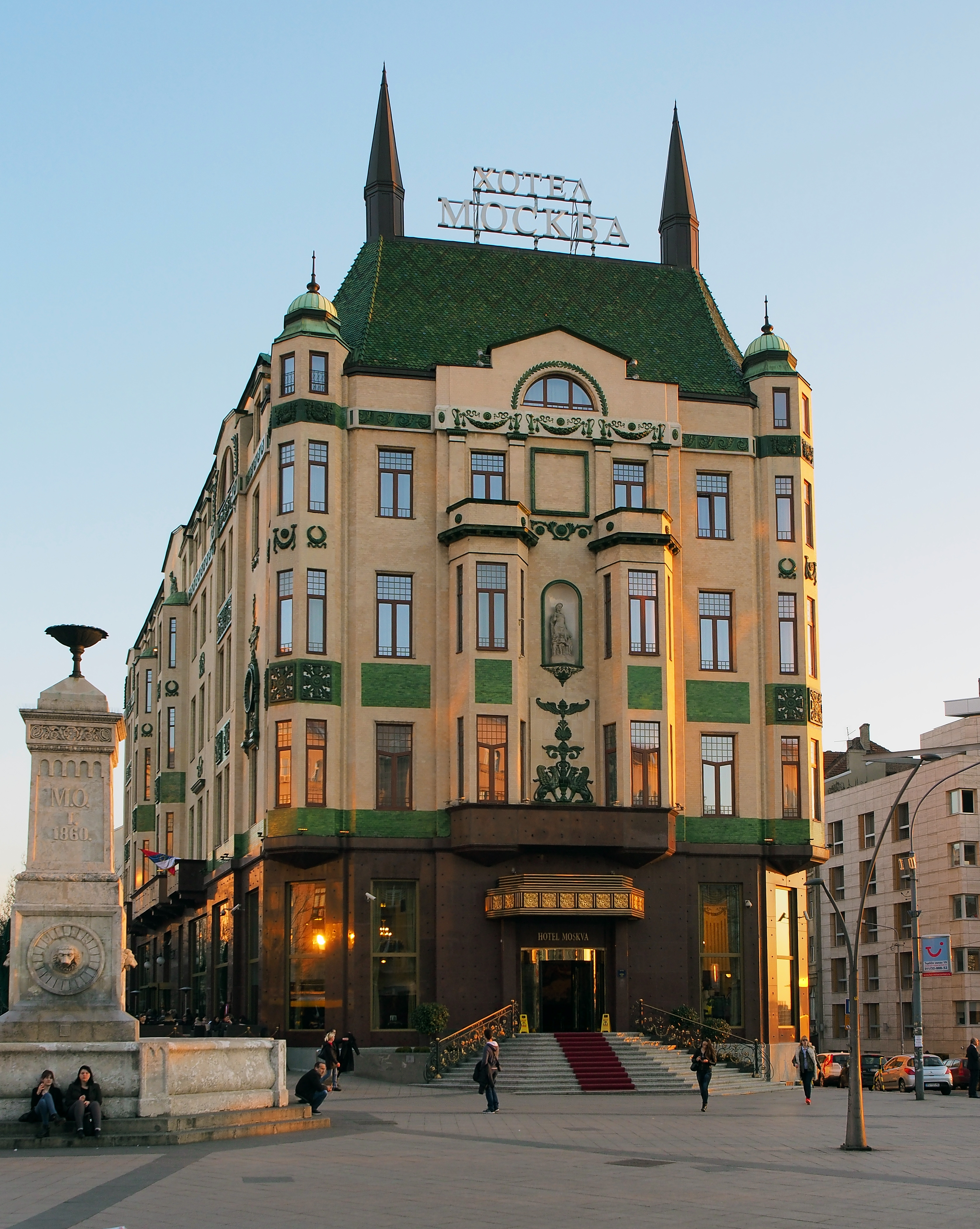
Hotel Moskva, an example of Art Nouveau architecture in Belgrade

The architecture of Belgrade is diverse and reflects its complex history and various cultural influences. The oldest preserved parts of the city are within the Belgrade Fortress, which has been rebuilt and modified over centuries. From the Ottoman period, a few structures remain, such as the Bajrakli Mosque (16th century) and Princess Ljubica's Residence (1829–1831), which is an example of Balkan-Oriental urban architecture with elements of Classicism.

In the 19th century, Belgrade transformed into a European city. Representative public buildings and private palaces were constructed in the styles of Neoclassicism, Romanticism, and later Academicism (e.g., Captain Miša's Mansion (1863), the National Theatre (1869), the Old Palace (1882–1884)). The early 20th century saw the rise of Secession (Art Nouveau), with prominent examples like the Hotel Moskva (1908) and the Belgrade Cooperative building (1905–1907).

The interwar period (1918–1941) was an era of flourishing Modern architecture in Belgrade, influenced by Bauhaus and Art Deco. Architects such as Milan Zloković, Branislav Kojić, Dragiša Brašovan, and Nikola Dobrović designed significant public and residential buildings (e.g., the Rectorate Building of the University of Belgrade, the PRIZAD building).

After World War II, mass construction took place in New Belgrade in the styles of Socialist Modernism and later Brutalism. Notable examples include the Palace of Serbia (SIV Building), the Genex Tower (Western City Gate), and numerous residential blocks. Contemporary architecture continues to shape the city's appearance.

== Literature and publishing ==
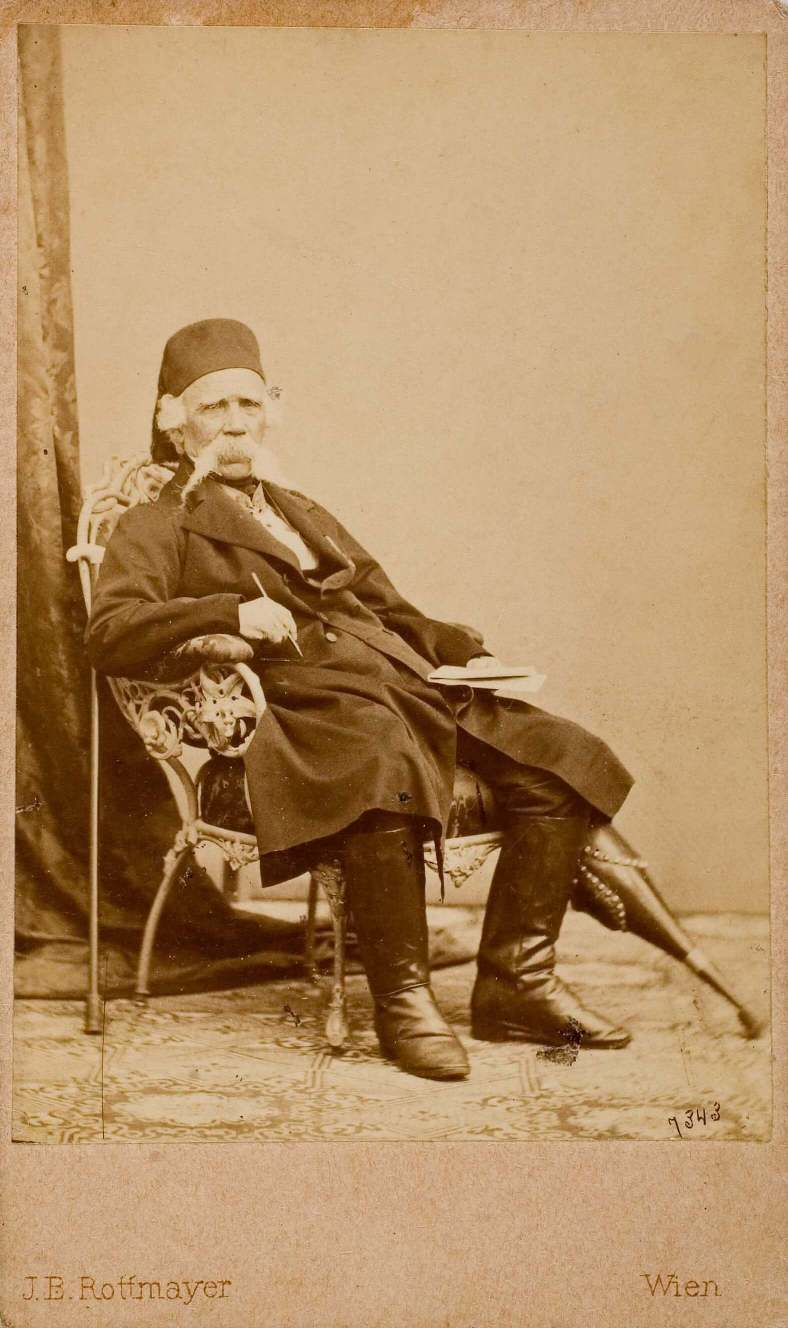
Vuk Karadžić

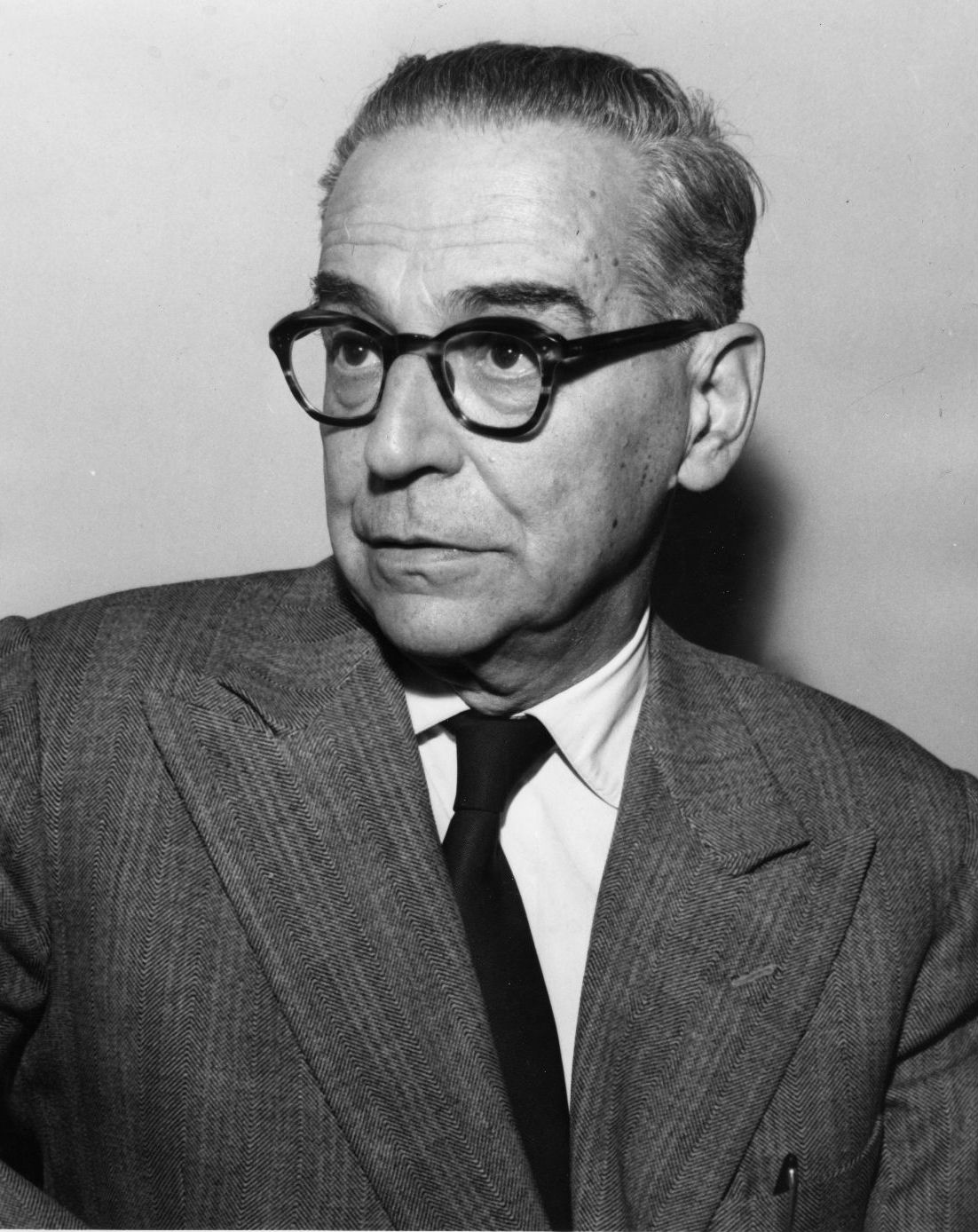
Ivo Andrić

Belgrade has traditionally been the most important center of Serbian literature, publishing, and literary life. Many prominent Serbian writers have lived and worked in Belgrade, making it a meeting place for diverse literary ideas and movements. In the 19th century, the work of Vuk Karadžić, although he was not permanently based in Belgrade, had a crucial impact on the development of the literary language. Significant writers of this century associated with Belgrade include Branislav Nušić, whose comedies remain popular, as well as Milovan Glišić, Laza Lazarević, and Stevan Sremac. Nobel laureate Ivo Andrić wrote his most famous works, The Bridge on the Drina and The Damned Yard, in Belgrade, where he spent most of his life and where his memorial museum is located today. Other prominent 20th-century writers whose lives and work are inextricably linked to Belgrade include Miloš Crnjanski (Migrations, A Novel of London), Meša Selimović (Death and the Dervish, The Fortress), Borislav Pekić (The Golden Fleece, How to Quiet a Vampire), Milorad Pavić (Dictionary of the Khazars), Danilo Kiš (A Tomb for Boris Davidovich), Dobrica Ćosić (Roots, A Time of Death), Desanka Maksimović, and Vasko Popa. In contemporary literature, Belgrade remains the dominant center, with numerous writers, publishing houses, and literary events. The Belgrade Book Fair is one of the largest and most visited literary events in the region. Key institutions such as the Association of Writers of Serbia and the Serbian Literary Society are based in Belgrade.

== Music ==
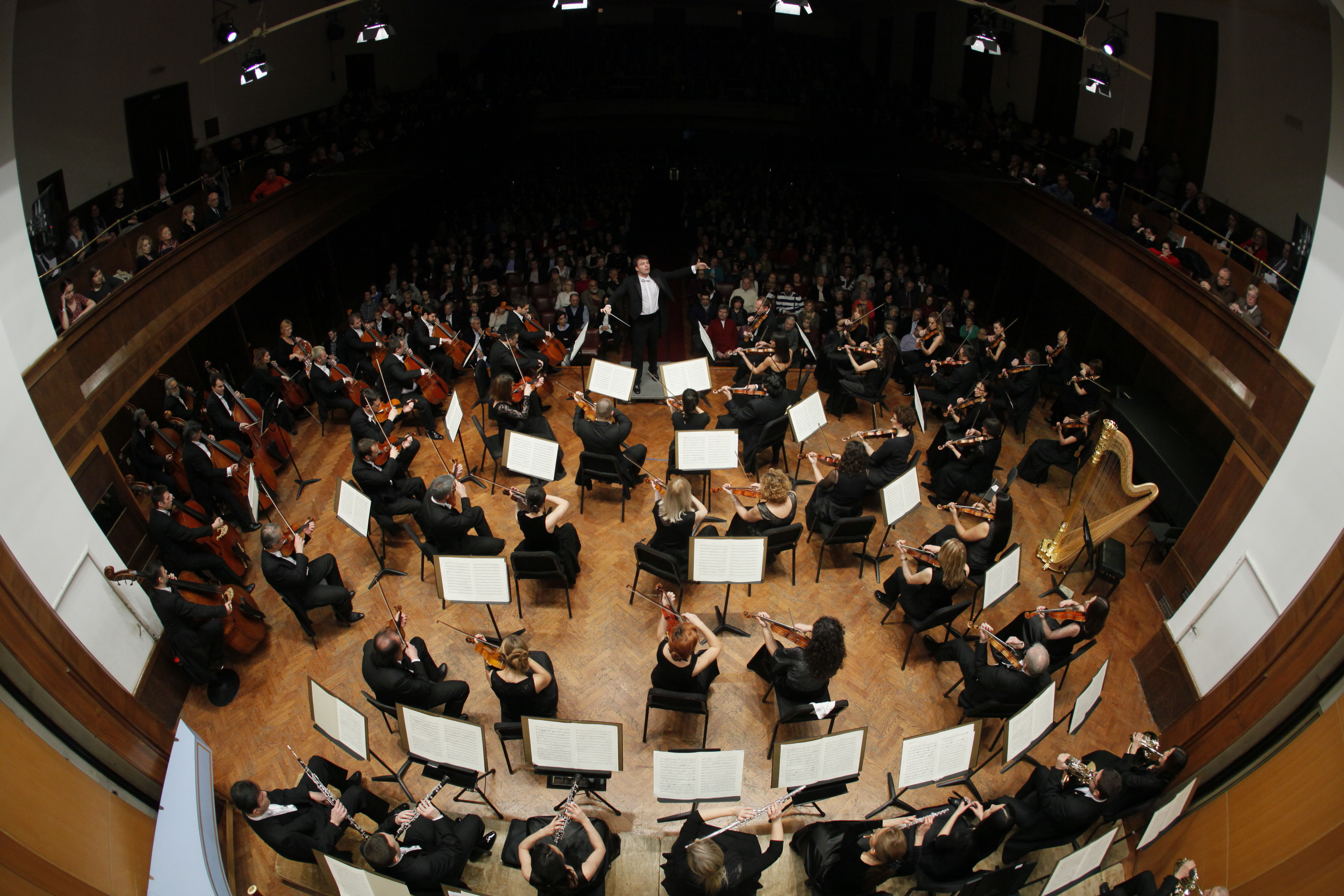
Concert hall of the Belgrade Philharmonic Orchestra

Belgrade has a rich and diverse music scene, from classical and traditional music to contemporary popular genres.

=== Classical and art music ===
The Belgrade Philharmonic Orchestra, founded in 1923, is the leading symphony orchestra in Serbia and the region. The Opera and Ballet of the National Theatre in Belgrade, as well as the Madlenianum Opera and Theatre, cultivate classical opera and ballet repertoire. The Belgrade Music Festival (BEMUS) is the oldest and most significant international festival of classical music in Serbia, founded in 1969. The Faculty of Music Arts is the central higher education institution for music. Numerous choirs, chamber ensembles, and soloists actively contribute to the city's classical music scene.

=== Popular music ===
Belgrade has been and remains a center for various popular music genres.

- New Wave: During the late 1970s and 1980s, Belgrade was one of the main centers of the Yugoslav "New Wave" (Novi talas), with influential bands such as Idoli, Ekatarina Velika, and Šarlo Akrobata.
- Rock music: Beyond New Wave, Belgrade has produced many other significant rock bands and artists, including Riblja Čorba, Bajaga i Instruktori, Partibrejkers, Električni Orgazam, and Van Gogh.
- Hip hop: Today, Belgrade is a center of the Serbian hip hop scene, with artists such as Beogradski Sindikat, Marčelo, and Bad Copy.
- Turbo-folk: During the 1990s, the city was a major center for the turbo-folk music genre.

Belgrade hosts major music festivals like the Belgrade Beer Fest and the Belgrade Jazz Festival.

== Performing arts (theatre and film) ==
=== Theatre ===
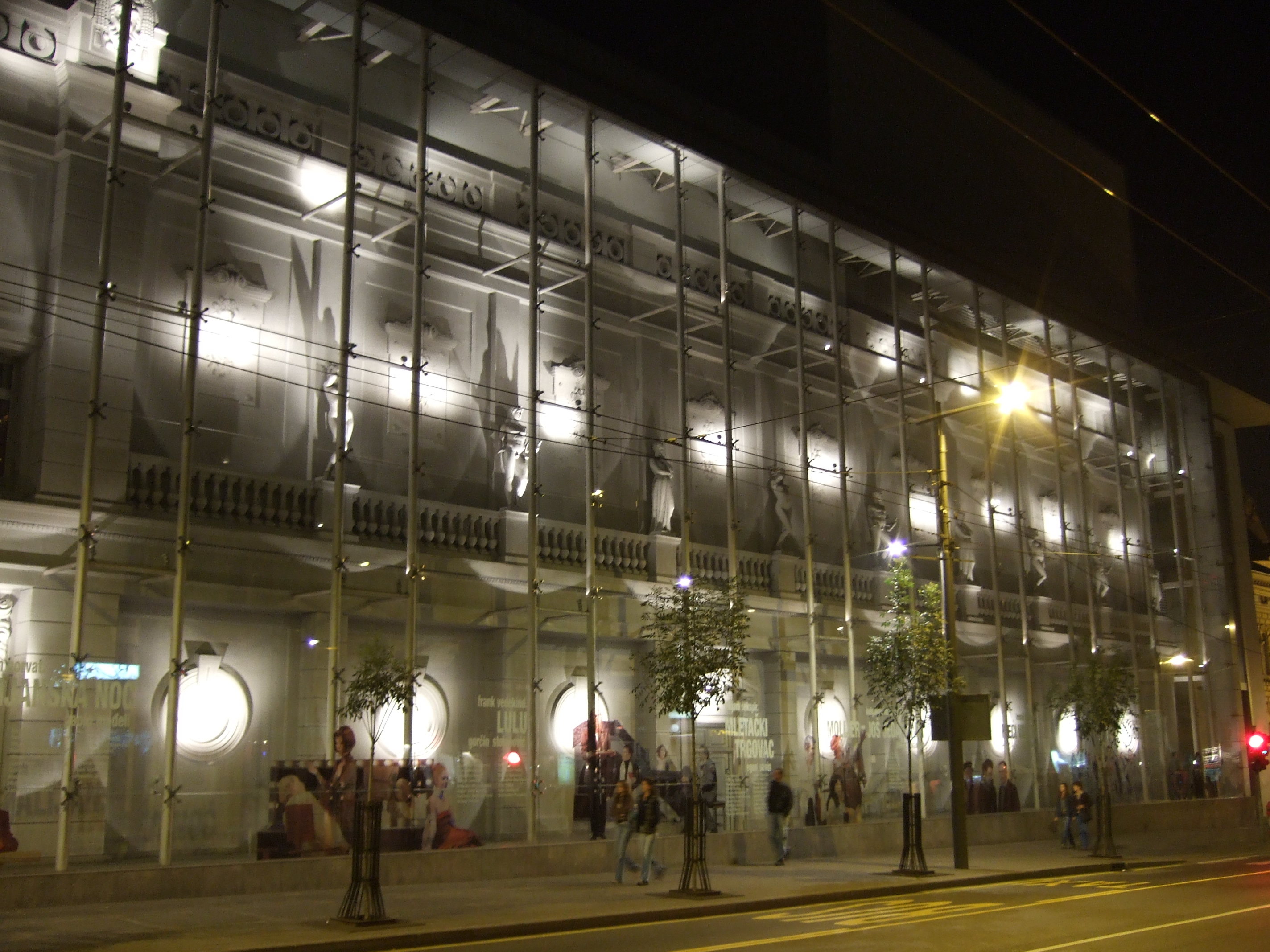
The Yugoslav Drama Theatre in Belgrade

Belgrade has a theatrical tradition and a contemporary scene.

- Key Theatres: The National Theatre (with Drama, Opera, and Ballet ensembles), the Yugoslav Drama Theatre (JDP), Atelje 212, the Belgrade Drama Theatre (BDP), Zvezdara Theatre, and the Terazije Theatre (specializing in musicals and operettas).
- Playwrights: Many significant Serbian playwrights have worked in Belgrade, from Branislav Nušić to contemporary authors like Dušan Kovačević and Biljana Srbljanović.
- Festivals: The Belgrade International Theatre Festival (BITEF) is one of the most important global festivals of new theatrical tendencies.
- Theatre Makers: The city has been a center for prominent directors (e.g., Bojan Stupica, Mira Trailović, Jovan Ćirilov, Dejan Mijač) and numerous generations of actors.

=== Film ===
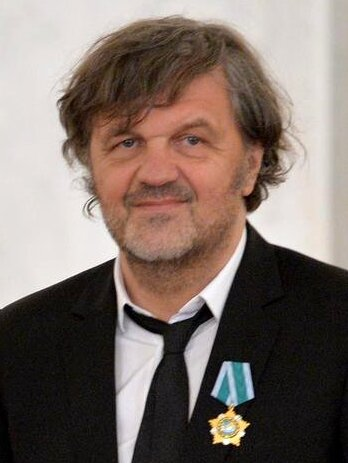
Emir Kusturica, award-winning film director associated with Belgrade

Most of the Serbian film industry is based in Belgrade. The city was also an important center for Yugoslav cinema.

- Directors: Many significant directors have worked or are working in Belgrade, including "Black Wave" authors like Aleksandar Petrović and Dušan Makavejev, as well as Slobodan Šijan, Goran Marković, Goran Paskaljević, and Emir Kusturica, whose film Underground (1995), a Palme d'Or winner at the Cannes Film Festival, was largely set and filmed in Belgrade.
- Festivals: FEST is the most prominent international film festival in Belgrade and Serbia.
- Institutions: The Yugoslav Film Archive (Jugoslovenska kinoteka), with its archive and museum, is the central institution for preserving film heritage. The Film Center Serbia supports domestic film production.

Belgrade has produced numerous celebrated film and theatre actors.

== Museums ==
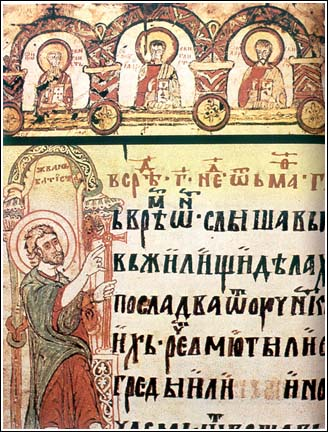
Miroslav Gospel, a medieval manuscript kept in the National Museum of Serbia in Belgrade

Belgrade has a large number of museums covering various fields of art, history, science, technology, and culture. The National Museum of Serbia, founded in 1844, is the oldest museum institution in Serbia and holds over 400,000 items, including the Miroslav Gospel. The Military Museum at Kalemegdan Fortress has rich collections of weapons, military equipment, flags, and documents, including parts of a downed F-117 Nighthawk "stealth" aircraft from the 1999 NATO bombing. The Aeronautical Museum near Nikola Tesla Airport exhibits over 200 aircraft and other items. The Ethnographic Museum (founded 1901) preserves traditional culture of the Balkan peoples. The Museum of Contemporary Art focuses on 20th and 21st-century art from the former Yugoslavia and Serbia. The Nikola Tesla Museum (founded 1952) houses the personal inheritance of the great scientist. Other significant museums include the Historical Museum of Serbia, the Museum of Natural History, the Museum of Applied Arts, the Pedagogical Museum, the Jewish Historical Museum, the Museum of African Art, the Automobile Museum, the PTT Museum, the Museum of Yugoslavia (with the House of Flowers), and the Museum of the City of Belgrade with its numerous legacies and departments (e.g., Princess Ljubica's Residence, Ivo Andrić Museum legacy, Paja Jovanović Museum legacy).

== Libraries and archives ==
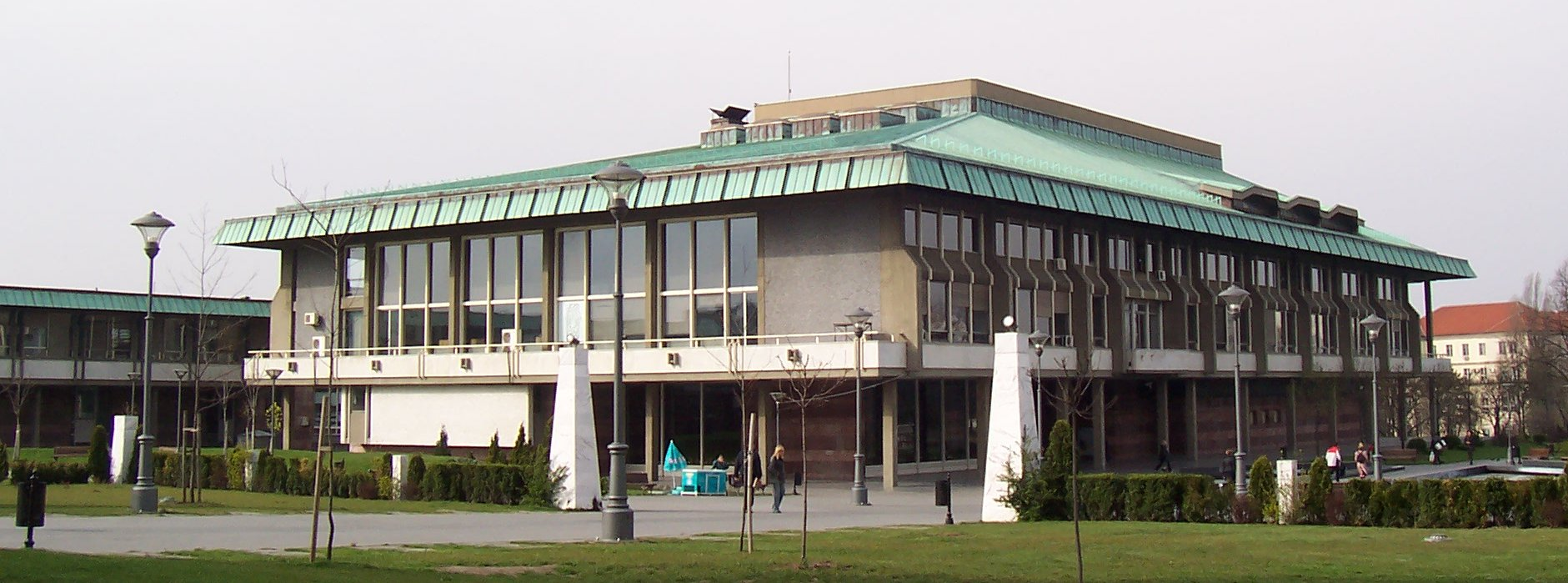
The National Library of Serbia in Belgrade

Belgrade is the seat of Serbia's most important library and archival institutions.

- The National Library of Serbia, founded in 1832, is the central national library.
- The University Library Svetozar Marković is the central library of the University of Belgrade and one of the largest scientific libraries in the Balkans.
- The Belgrade City Library is the largest public lending library in Serbia, with an extensive network of municipal branches.
- The Archives of Serbia holds archival materials of Serbian state bodies and institutions from the earliest times.
- The Archives of Yugoslavia preserves materials created by the bodies and organizations of the Yugoslav state (1918–2006).
- The Historical Archives of Belgrade collects, preserves, and processes archival materials created on the territory of the City of Belgrade.

== Manifestations and festivals ==
Belgrade hosts numerous internationally and domestically renowned cultural manifestations and festivals. In addition to BEMUS (music), BITEF (theatre), and FEST (film), prominent events include:

- The Belgrade Book Fair, one of the largest literary events in Southeastern Europe.
- The Belgrade Beer Fest, a major beer and music festival.
- Museums at Night (Noć muzeja), a popular event where cultural institutions open their doors to visitors in the evening.
- Street of Open Heart (Ulica otvorenog srca), a traditional New Year's Day humanitarian event in the city center.
- Belgrade Summer Festival (BELEF), a multidisciplinary summer festival featuring theatre, music, visual arts, and dance.

== Education in culture and arts ==
Belgrade is the leading educational center in Serbia.

- The University of Belgrade, founded in 1905 (continuing the tradition of the Great School from 1808), is the country's largest and oldest university, with numerous faculties educating professionals in humanities, social sciences, and arts.
- The University of Arts in Belgrade, established in 1957 as the Art Academy (became University of Arts in 1973), comprises the Faculty of Music Arts, Faculty of Fine Arts, Faculty of Dramatic Arts, and Faculty of Applied Arts.

The city also has an extensive network of approximately 195 primary and 85 secondary schools, including specialized art schools (music, ballet, fine arts).

== Media ==
Belgrade is the most significant media hub in Serbia. It is the headquarters of Radio Television of Serbia (RTS), the public broadcasting service, as well as numerous private national and local television and radio stations (e.g., RTV Pink, B92, Prva, Happy TV). Most national daily newspapers (Politika, Večernje novosti, Blic, Danas, Kurir) are published in Belgrade, along with numerous weeklies, magazines, and online portals. The headquarters of the largest news agencies (Tanjug, Beta, FoNet) are also in Belgrade.

== Urban culture ==
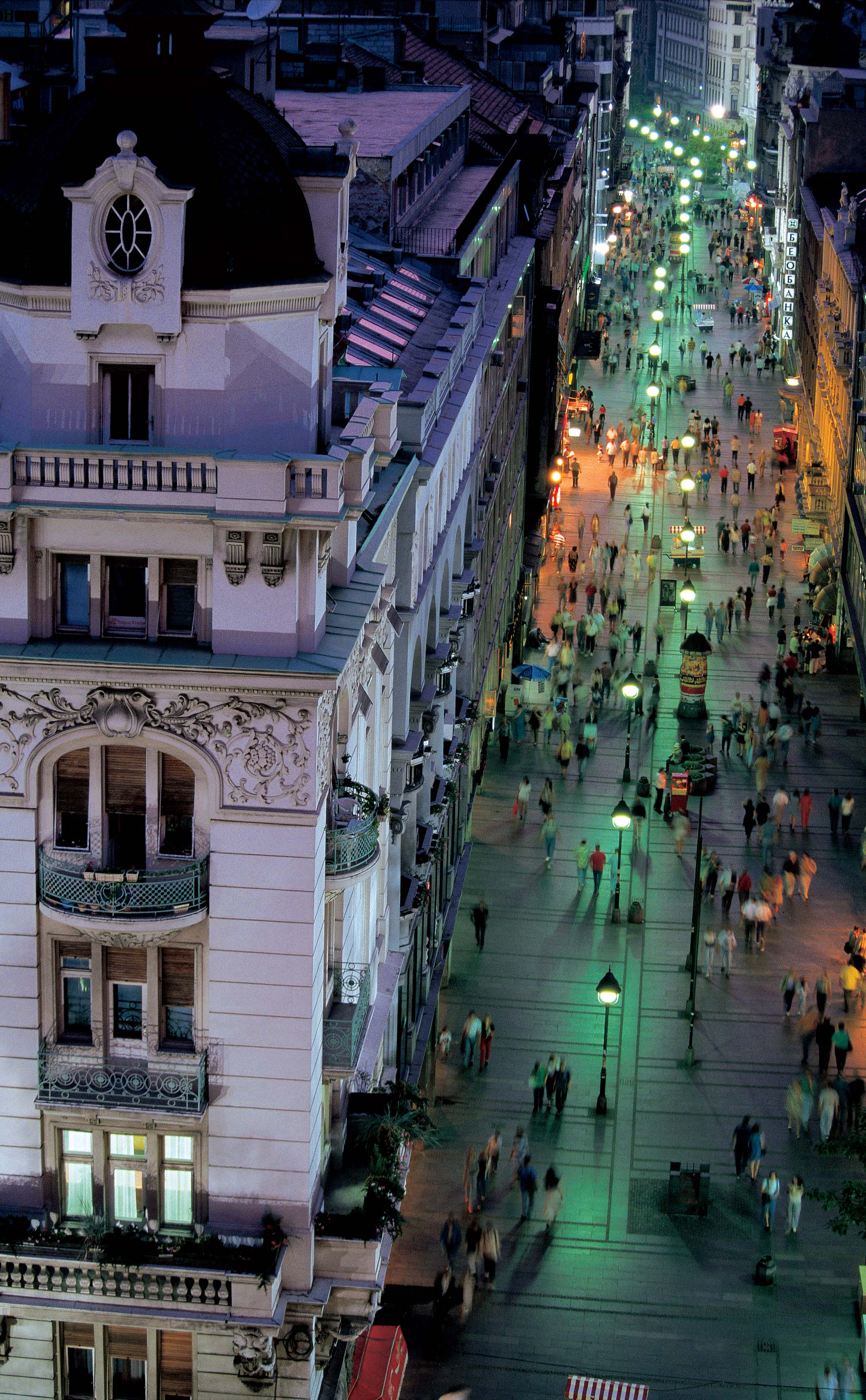
Knez Mihailova Street, Belgrade's main pedestrian and shopping zone

Belgrade is known for its dynamic urban life and specific atmosphere.

=== Nightlife ===
The city has a reputation as a capital offering vibrant nightlife daily, with numerous clubs, bars, and splav (river barges converted into clubs) along the banks of the Sava and Danube rivers, offering various types of music and entertainment until dawn. Well-known venues for alternative music and culture include clubs like Akademija (the club of the Faculty of Fine Arts) and KST (Club of Technical Students), as well as the Student Cultural Center (SKC). Skadarlija, the old bohemian quarter, offers traditional Serbian music and atmosphere.

=== Street art ===
Belgrade has a developed street art scene, with numerous graffiti, murals, and other interventions in public spaces, particularly in neighborhoods like Savamala and Dorćol.

== Gastronomy ==
The gastronomy of Belgrade is part of Serbian cuisine, characterized by heterogeneity and the influences of Mediterranean, Oriental (Turkish), and Central European (Austro-Hungarian) culinary traditions. The city offers a wide selection of restaurants, from those serving traditional Serbian food (grill, roasts, cooked dishes), through kafanas with starogradska (old town) music, to restaurants with international cuisines. Particularly popular are grilled specialties (ćevapi, pljeskavica), sarma, gibanica, kajmak, and ajvar.

== Sport ==
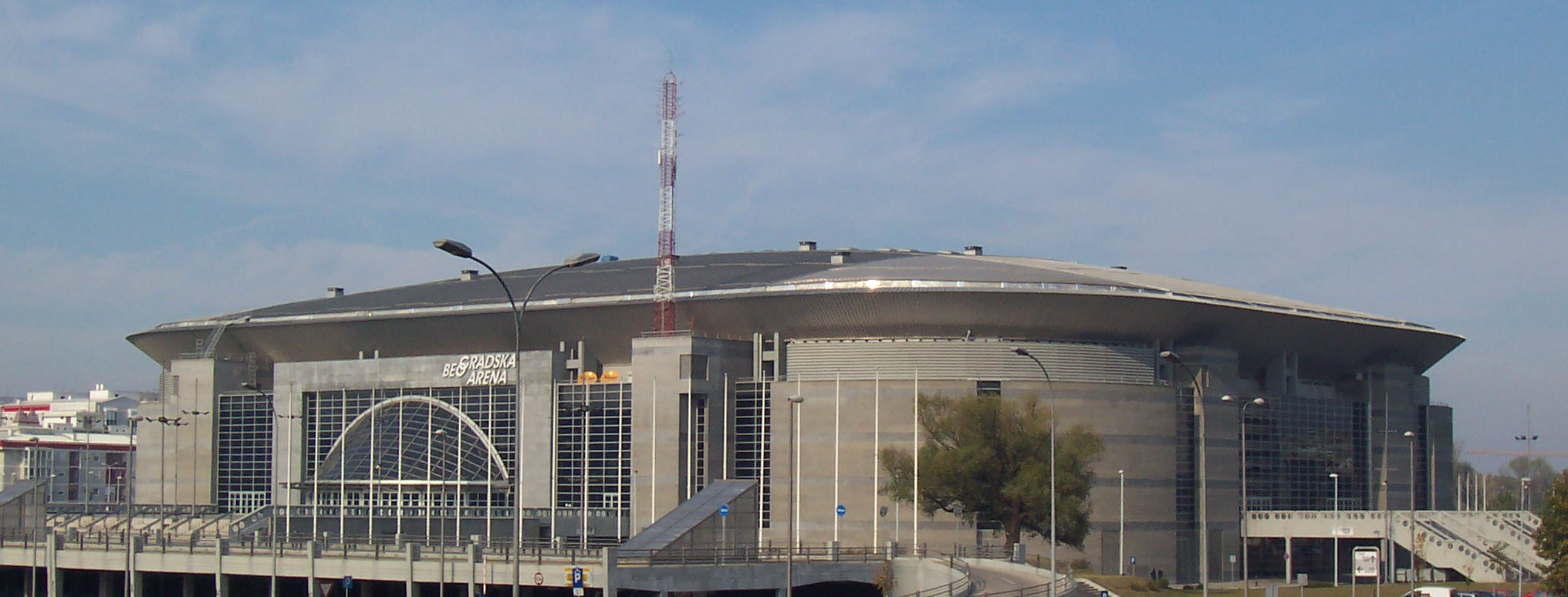
Belgrade Arena

Sport is an important part of Belgrade's culture and daily life. The city is home to Serbia's two largest and most successful sports societies, Red Star and Partizan, whose football and basketball clubs have a large number of supporters. The largest stadiums are Rajko Mitić Stadium (Red Star Stadium) and Partizan Stadium. The Belgrade Arena (Štark Arena) is one of the largest multi-purpose indoor arenas in Europe and hosts numerous sports and music events. Ada Ciganlija is a popular sports and recreational complex. Belgrade has hosted significant international sports competitions, including European championships in basketball, volleyball, water polo, as well as the 2009 Summer Universiade.

== See also ==
- Culture of Serbia
- History of Belgrade
