= Jovan Rašković =

Serbian politician and academic (1929–1992)

- Јован Рашковић
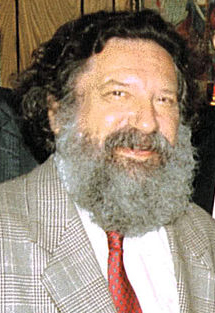
- Rašković in Third Lake in 1990

1st President of the Serb Democratic Party
- In office 17 February 1990 – December 1990
- Preceded by: Position established
- Succeeded by: Milan Babić

Personal details
- Born: 5 July 1929 Knin, Kingdom of Serbs, Croats, and Slovenes (modern Croatia)
- Died: 28 July 1992 (aged 63) Belgrade, Serbia, FR Yugoslavia
- Party: Serb Democratic Party
- Children: Sanda Rašković Ivić
- Education: University of Zagreb
- Profession: Psychiatrist

Jovan Rašković (Serbian Cyrillic: Јован Рашковић, pronounced [jǒʋan rǎʃkoʋitɕ]; 5 July 1929 – 28 July 1992) was a Croatian Serb politician. He was leader of the Serb Democratic Party.

== Early life ==
Rašković was born in Knin in 1929. During World War II in Yugoslavia, after a pogrom by the Ustaše which resulted in the deaths of his relatives, he was exiled to Kistanje in Italian-occupied Dalmatia. Witnessing, in 1941, the psychological effect of genocide on a bereaved man from Kistanje who had lost his family left a strong impact on his worldview.

He passed his secondary school exams in Šibenik, and graduated in Zagreb. He studied medicine at the University of Zagreb, receiving his diploma in 1956 and a degree in psychiatry in 1962. He received a PhD in neuropsychiatry from the university's medical school in 1975.

== Career ==
=== Before the wars ===
In the 1960s, he served as director of Šibenik city hospital and later director of the medical center. He was one of the founders of the Medical Research Institute of Neurophysiology in Ljubljana. Rašković was a member of the Serbian Academy of Sciences and Arts, the Academy of Medical Sciences of Croatia and a number of psychiatry associations in the United States, Czechoslovakia and Italy. He was a university professor in Zagreb and Ljubljana and a visiting professor at the Universities of Pavia, Rome, Houston and London. Rašković split his time between his house in Primošten and his apartment in Šibenik.

Although he was not a member of the Serbian Academy of Sciences and Arts at the time of its drafting, at least one source claimed that he was extensively consulted from his home in Croatia by Serbian nationalist intellectual Dobrica Ćosić when the controversial 1986 SANU Memorandum was being developed. Moreover, later in 1990, Rašković was formally inducted into the organisation.

Sometime in 1990, Rašković published a book entitled Luda zemlja (A Mad Country), in which he fused Freudian psychoanalysis with a Serbian supremacist worldview:

The Croats, feminized by the Catholic religion, suffer from a castration complex. That makes them totally incapable of exercising authority over others. They compensate their humiliation by their great culture. As to the Muslims of Bosnia-Herzegovina and neighboring regions, they are the victims, as Freud might have said, of anal frustrations, which incite them to amass wealth and to seek refuge in fanatic attitudes. Finally, the Serbs, the Orthodox, an Oedipal people, tend to liberate themselves from the authority of the father. From this spirit of resistance, they draw the courage of the warriors, who are the only ones capable of exerting real authority over the other peoples of Yugoslavia. It is no wonder that the situation of complete hatred and paranoia develops in this country.

In this book, he also argued that the lack of collective guilt on the part of Croats for the genocides during World War II, which had left Serbs traumatised, had brought about "asymmetrical memories of recent history," which would bring conflict between the two ethnic groups.

In February 1990, Rašković went into politics and founded and led the Serb Democratic Party (SDS), which took part in the first Croatian democratic elections. He noticed that there was no equivalent party in Bosnia and Herzegovina so he contacted Radovan Karadžić, a colleague, to suggest for him to establish one. The two, both psychiatrists by profession, gave lectures in Bosnia-Herzegovina from the period of 1990–1991, in which they tried to incite "hatred and militancy" among the local Serbs there, working them into a "state of frenzy and paranoia."

=== Onset of violence ===
In August 1990, the "first act of organized violence" to erupt among Croatian Serbs occurred under the leadership of Rašković, when local Serbs confiscated weapons from a Knin police station and murdered the Croatian police stationed there. After consultation with Yugoslav and Serbian president Slobodan Milošević, who promised to supply arms for the Croatian Serbs, the local Serbs militias set up blockades in the Krajina region, signalling the outset of the so-called Log Revolution.

Although the SDS won relatively few seats in the 1990 elections, it quickly began to increase its power, and Rašković was soon perceived as a leader of Serbs by Franjo Tuđman and his new government. That led to direct negotiations between the two about the future of Serbs in Croatia. During one meeting, Rašković remarked, "Serbs were crazy people" who would not listen to him. Tuđman's chief political advisor, Slaven Letica, had the words secretly taped and leaked the transcript to Croatian media to discredit Rašković among his people and then replace him with someone more acceptable to the Croatian government. That backfired, as, instead of rejecting Rašković, many Serbs lost any trust in Croatian government and embraced extremism and then armed conflict.

Later in 1990, Rašković, who was seen as a "moderate" that recognised Croatian sovereignty, but wanted to negotiate in favour of autonomy and national rights for the Serb minority, was removed from power by "more radical, hard-line Serb nationalists" such as Milan Babić, who advocated armed autonomy and went on to create the Republic of Serbian Krajina. For his part, Tuđman, an ardent Croatian nationalist, rejected Rašković's more moderate demands, thus legitimising the rise of more radical Serbian nationalist resistance forces. The most important of these demands was the continued recognition of Serbs as a constituent people of Croatia, which Tuđman's government rejected; in December 1990, a new Croatian constitution was passed which, although it granted cultural autonomy to Serbs, said that Croatia was legally the "national state of the Croats" only.

To make matters worse, Rašković was also receiving pressure from Belgrade, which political scientist Nina Caspersen argued was more instrumental in increasing tensions than Tuđman's hardline stances. To begin, the Serbian government pressured Rašković to reject Tudman's offer of a position in his government. Moreover, Rašković, an anti-communist nationalist, publicly opposed Serbian president Slobodan Milošević, whom he referred to as "a big Bolshevik, a communist, and a tyrant to the tips of his toes." He also tried competing electorally in Serbia against Milošević, whereas the more militant Milan Babić showed unreserved support for Milošević and, in turn, received support from him. To back this up, Caspersen made note of a poll from December 1990 indicating that 86% of Serbs held positive views of Rašković, whereas it was only 54% for Babić. Additionally, the overwhelming majority of SDS's main board still supported Rašković over Babić by February 1991. Taken all together, Caspersen argued that this outside support from Belgrade provided the necessary means of shifting the orientation of Croatian Serbdom from "democratic to non-democratic resources." Soon after Babić founded the more radical SDS Krajina party, Rašković said that "for the first time, I warned that this radical group, which wanted to take over the SDS, is a danger for us, and that war will definitely result if they exacerbate things."

Rašković retired from politics in 1991, after the Plitvice Lakes incident.

Rašković later expressed fear about the collective state of mind of Serbs, saying that "Serb myths have entered the Serb spirit, but with a dose of poison, spite, vengeance, [and] regression," which he believed needed to be "controlled in order to make less poisonous." In early 1992, Rašković gave an apologetic statement on Belgrade television:

I feel responsible because I made the preparations for this war, even if not the military preparations. If I hadn't created this emotional strain in the Serbian people, nothing would have happened. My party and I lit the fuse of Serbian nationalism not only in Croatia, but everywhere else in Bosnia-Herzegovina. It's impossible to imagine an SDP (Serbian Democratic Party) in Bosnia-Herzegovina, or a Mr. Karadžić in power, without our influence. We have driven this people, and we have given it an identity. I have repeated again and again to this people that it comes from heaven, not earth.

== Death and legacy ==
Rašković died in Belgrade from a heart attack on 28 July 1992 at the age of 63. Bosnian Serb leader Radovan Karadžić, who was a friend and colleague, considered Rašković to be "his main role model and inspiration."

He is interred in the Alley of Distinguished Citizens in the Belgrade New Cemetery. In addition, there are streets in Trebinje, Prijedor, Banja Luka and Novi Banovci named in his honor as well.
