= Nonković =

Nonković (Serbian Cyrillic: Нонковић) is a Serbo-Croatian surname. It may refer to:

- Frane Nonković (1939–2023), Yugoslav Croatian water polo player
- Biljana Nonković Balašević (born 1983), Serbian painter
- Vlade Nonković, Serbian former counter admiral and member of General Staff (fl. 1998–99).
- Dušan Nonković, Serb diaspora journalist, recipient of Medal of Humanity (2005).

== Anthropology ==
It is borne predominantly by ethnic Serbs (who are Orthodox Christian). Families with the surname are found in Popovo Valley (in Bosnia and Herzegovina); Kninsko Polje, Žagrović, and Golubić near Knin; Perušić Benkovački, Islam Grčki and Smilčić in Ravni Kotari (in Croatia); Njeguši (in Montenegro). In Croatia, there are about 130 people with the surname, the majority Serbs.

The surname (or patronymic) is attested in 1530, with the mention of a Matko Nikolin Nonković from Kotor who sold a house to Nikola Cuca. In the late 17th century, several hajduks in Herzegovina with the surname are mentioned as participating in the Great Turkish War (1683–99), such as Nikola Nonković and Vule Nonković.

== See also ==
- Ninković, surname
- Nojković, surname

== Sources ==
- Filipović, Milenko S.; Mićević, Ljubo (1959). Popovo u Herzegovini: antropogeografski prikaz. Naučno društvo NR Bosne i Hercegovine.
- Mihić, Ljubo (1975). Ljubinje sa okolinom. Dragan Srnić. pp. 189–191, 196, 795.
