= Đurđe S. Ninković =

Yugoslav hotelier

Djurdje S. Ninković
- Born: Djurdje S. Ninković; 1888; Vinča, Kingdom of Serbia
- Died: 1940 (aged 52); Belgrade, Kingdom of Yugoslavia
- Occupation: Hotelier
- Years active: 1920–1940
- Known for: Being a pioneer of the functional business hotel model in the Kingdom of Yugoslavia
- Children: Two
- Parent(s): Stanislav Ninković (father), farmer, mill owner, Mayor of Vinča
- Awards: Order of the Yugoslav Crown

Djurdje S. Ninković (1888–1940) was a prominent businessman and hotelier in Belgrade, Kingdom of Yugoslavia, in the 1920s and 1930s. At that time Belgrade had very few hotels and Ninković was a pioneer in establishing functional style affordable hotels specifically aimed at business people.

== Hotels ==
In 1930 he commissioned the well known architect Branislav Kojić, who was a proponent of the traditional Serbian national style but also incorporating principles of modernism, to design a new hotel opposite the main Belgrade Glavna railway station and the central Post Office building. The blandly named hotel Pošta (the Post office hotel) on Sava Square, with some 35 guest rooms and a restaurant, was completed and opened in 1931. From adverts in newspapers in 1931 it can be seen that the hotel boasted modern furniture, with hot and cold running water in each room and every other room had a radio, which was a rarity at the time.

In 1937, hotelier Djurdje S. Ninković together with his son-in-law, architect Ivan Savković, commenced the project to build, what was at the time, one of the biggest hotels in Belgrade. On the opposite side of Sava Square architect Savković, who was a proponent of the modernist architectural style, made a utilitarian and functional design for hotel Astoria which was opened for guests on 1 May 1938. It was being advertised as having the most modern facilities of the time.

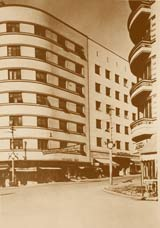
Hotel Astoria 1938 (on right), view from the Milovana Milovanovića Street

Through the 1930s hotelier Ninković was very much involved in all aspects of the hotel industry in Belgrade. Being a governor of the newly established hospitality and hotel studies high school and, on the recommendation of the Chamber of Commerce and Trades in Belgrade, he was appointed by the Ministry of Justice to serve as an honorary judge (počasni sudija) of the Trade Court (Trgovacki sud) in Belgrade.

== Awards ==
He was awarded the Order of the Yugoslav Crown in 1940 for services to the hotel industry by HM King Peter II of Yugoslavia.

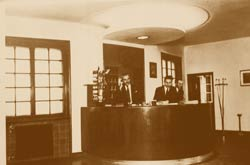
Reception of hotel Astoria 1938 with Đura Ninković (on the left) on the phone

== Legacy ==
The concept of the functional and affordable hotel for increasing travel needs of business people took off in Yugoslavia after the Second World War through increase in rail travel for trade and business. In the 1960s and 1970s the advent of air travel showed that hotelier Ninković had correctly anticipated the development of the affordable business hotel concept. Both Astoria and Pošta are still operating today as hotels. It is a testimony to their strategic position that they are still two of the closest hotels to the main entrance of the Belgrade Glavna railway station. However, the area around the station, known as Savamala, deteriorated in character after the Second World War and became run down as private property was confiscated and enterprising individuals and businesses were replaced by communist state owned concerns. It is only recently since 2001, with the advent of post-communist private capital, that major buildings have been privatised and renovated and the Savamala area is re-establishing its respectability.

Hotelier Ninković's grandson, also named Djurdje Ninković, has been engaged in long term campaigning and litigation for restitution of hotelier Ninković's property which was forcibly nationalized by the Communist Government of Yugoslavia in 1948.
