= Pravdica =

Pravdica is a Croatian surname. Notable people with the surname include:

- Christopher Pravdica (born 1975), American musician and songwriter
- Filip Pravdica (born 1995), Croatian long jumper

== See also ==
- Pravdić
