= Boško Petrović =

Boško Petrović may refer to:

- Boško Petrović (aviator) (1911–1937), Serbian flying ace of the Spanish Civil War
- Boško Petrović (writer) (1915–2001), Serbian writer and translator
- Boško Petrović (footballer) (born 1975), Serbian footballer
