= Sanda Rašković Ivić =

Serbian politician (born 1956)

- Санда Рашковић Ивић
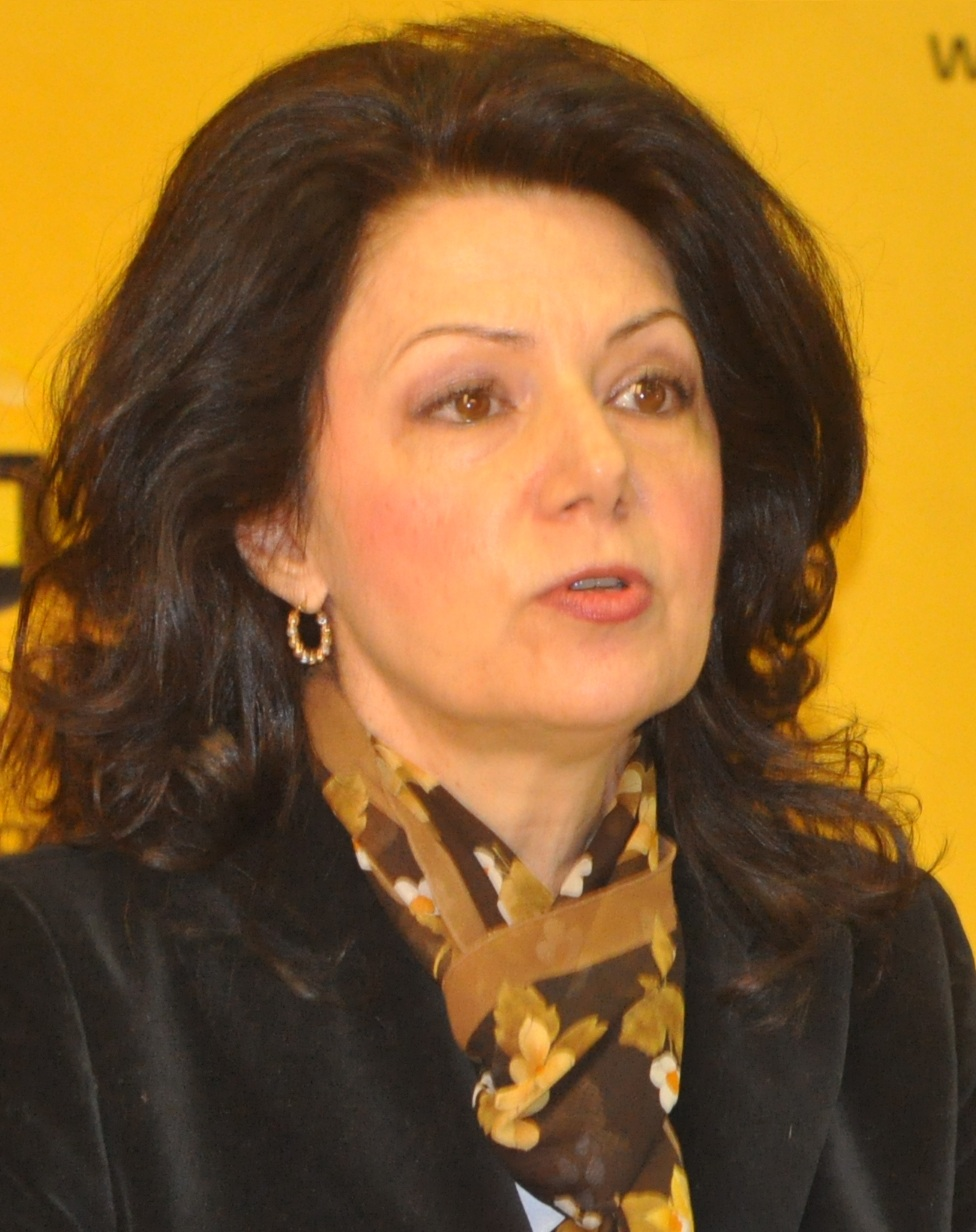

President of the Democratic Party of Serbia
- In office 12 October 2014 – 2 August 2016
- Preceded by: Aleksandar Popović (acting)
- Succeeded by: Dragan Maršićanin (acting); Miloš Jovanović

Serbian ambassador to Italy
- In office 2008–2011

Personal details
- Born: Sanda Rašković; 8 January 1956 (age 70) Zagreb, PR Croatia, FPR Yugoslavia
- Party: DC (–2003); DSS (2003–2016); Independent (2016–2017); NS (2017–)
- Spouses: Ivan Bujas (div. 1990); Aleksandar Ivić (m. 1993; died 2020)
- Children: 3
- Parents: Jovan Rašković (father); Tanja Stipišić (mother)
- Education: Zagreb School of Medicine; Belgrade Faculty of Medicine
- Alma mater: University of Zagreb; University of Belgrade
- Profession: Psychiatrist

Sanda Rašković Ivić (Serbian Cyrillic: Санда Рашковић Ивић, pronounced [sânda râʃkoʋit͡ɕ ǐːʋit͡ɕ]; born 8 January 1956) is a former Serbian politician, psychiatrist and psychotherapist. She was the president of the Democratic Party of Serbia from 2014 to 2016. She has served as one of the vice-presidents of the People's Party since 2017 and is currently serving as a member of the National Assembly of Serbia.

She was previously a commissioner for refugees, the president of Coordination Center for Kosovo and Metohija, and Serbian ambassador to Italy

== Biography ==
She is a daughter of doctors Jovan Rašković and Tanja Stipišić. She is of paternal Serb descent, and maternal Croat and Italian descent. Her maternal grandmother was from Trieste. She finished primary and high school in Šibenik and the School of Medicine of the University of Zagreb in 1980. She passed her examination for psychiatrist in 1986. Sanda is the author of many technical papers of psychiatry and psychotherapy.

Party political offices
Preceded by Aleksandar Popović (Acting)	Leader of the Democratic Party of Serbia; 2014–2016	Succeeded by Dragan Maršićanin (Acting)
