= Aleksandar Pravdić =

Serbian politician

Aleksandar Pravdić (born in Čačak in 1958) is a former Deputy Prime Minister in the Government of Serbia (2001-2004).

== Biography ==
He graduated from the University of Belgrade Faculty of Economics and until 2000 was employed as an economist in the Health Center in Gornji Milanovac.

He is a long-standing member of the Democratic Party of Serbia and has held elected positions within the party as Member of the General Committee of the DSS several times. He also served as the vice-president of DSS and was elected as Member of the Federal Assembly of the Federal Republic of Yugoslavia in 2000, when he moved to Belgrade.

Since 2005, Mr Pravdić has been the government appointed CEO of Galenika the biggest pharmaceuticals company in Serbia, which is still government owned. He was given the award as the "best manager in Serbia" for 2007 because under his leadership Galenika has markedly improved its business performance. He is married with two children.

He is currently a member of the Advisory Council of the DSS.
