= New Democratic Party of Serbia =

Political party in Serbia

New Democratic Party of Serbia Нова Демократска странка Србије
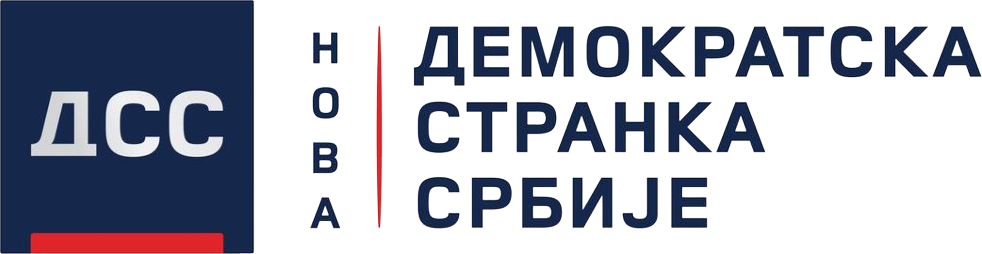
- Abbreviation: NDSS; DSS (formerly)
- President: Miloš Jovanović (Note: Jovanović announced his resignation as president of the party on 26 October 2026, a day after the parliamentary election.)
- Vice-Presidents: Dejan Šulkić; Zoran Sandić; Predrag Marsenić; Siniša Atlagić; Uroš Janković
- Founder: Vojislav Koštunica
- Founded: 26 July 1992; 34 years ago
- Split from: Democratic Party
- Headquarters: Braće Jugovića 2a, Belgrade
- Ideology: National conservatism
- Political position: Right-wing
- European affiliation: European People's Party (formerly)
- International affiliation: Alliance of Democrats; International Democrat Union (formerly)
- Alliance: National Democratic Alternative
- Colours: Blue
- National Assembly: 0 / 250
- Assembly of Vojvodina: 4 / 120
- City Assembly of Belgrade: 0 / 110

Website
- novidss.rs

The New Democratic Party of Serbia (Note: Serbian: Нова Демократска странка Србије, romanized: Nova Demokratska stranka Srbije, [nôːʋa demǒkratskaː strânka sr̂bije]) (NDSS), known as the Democratic Party of Serbia (DSS) until 2022, is a national-conservative political party in Serbia. It has been led by Miloš Jovanović since 2016; he announced his resignation on 26 October 2026, after the party failed to enter the National Assembly in the 2026 parliamentary election.

DSS was formed in 1992 as a conservative split from the Democratic Party (DS) and played a key role in the opposition during the 1990s. It was part of the "Together" coalition and later a founding member of the Democratic Opposition of Serbia (DOS). Its first leader, Vojislav Koštunica, was elected president of Yugoslavia in 2000 and held the post until 2003. DSS left the DOS government in 2001 and remained in opposition until the 2003 parliamentary election, after which it formed a government with other centre-right parties, with Koštunica as prime minister. It returned to opposition in 2008, after it was unable to form a government. The party declined in the 2010s and failed to cross the threshold in the 2014 parliamentary election, after which Koštunica resigned as party leader. He was succeeded by Sanda Rašković Ivić, under whom DSS re-entered the National Assembly in 2016 in a coalition with Dveri. Rašković Ivić was ousted after the election and was succeeded by Jovanović.

A former member of the European People's Party, it maintained a centre-right and moderately conservative image until the early 2010s, when the party shifted to a more right-wing and Eurosceptic position. Since 2021, it has led the National Democratic Alternative (NADA) coalition, which won seats in the 2022 and 2023 elections. In 2026, it ran as "Authentic Right" with the Monarchists and won less than 1% of the vote.

== History ==
=== 1992–2000 ===
The Democratic Party of Serbia (DSS) was founded in 1992 by a breakaway nationalist faction of the Democratic Party (DS), which advocated involvement in the Democratic Movement of Serbia (DEPOS).

Founding members of the party were Vojislav Koštunica, Vladeta Janković, Đurđe Ninković, Draško Petrović, Mirko Petrović and Vladan Batić. The founding assembly was held on 26 July 1992 and elected Vojislav Koštunica as its first president. The first party assembly was held on 5 December 1992 and adopted the party's first manifesto.

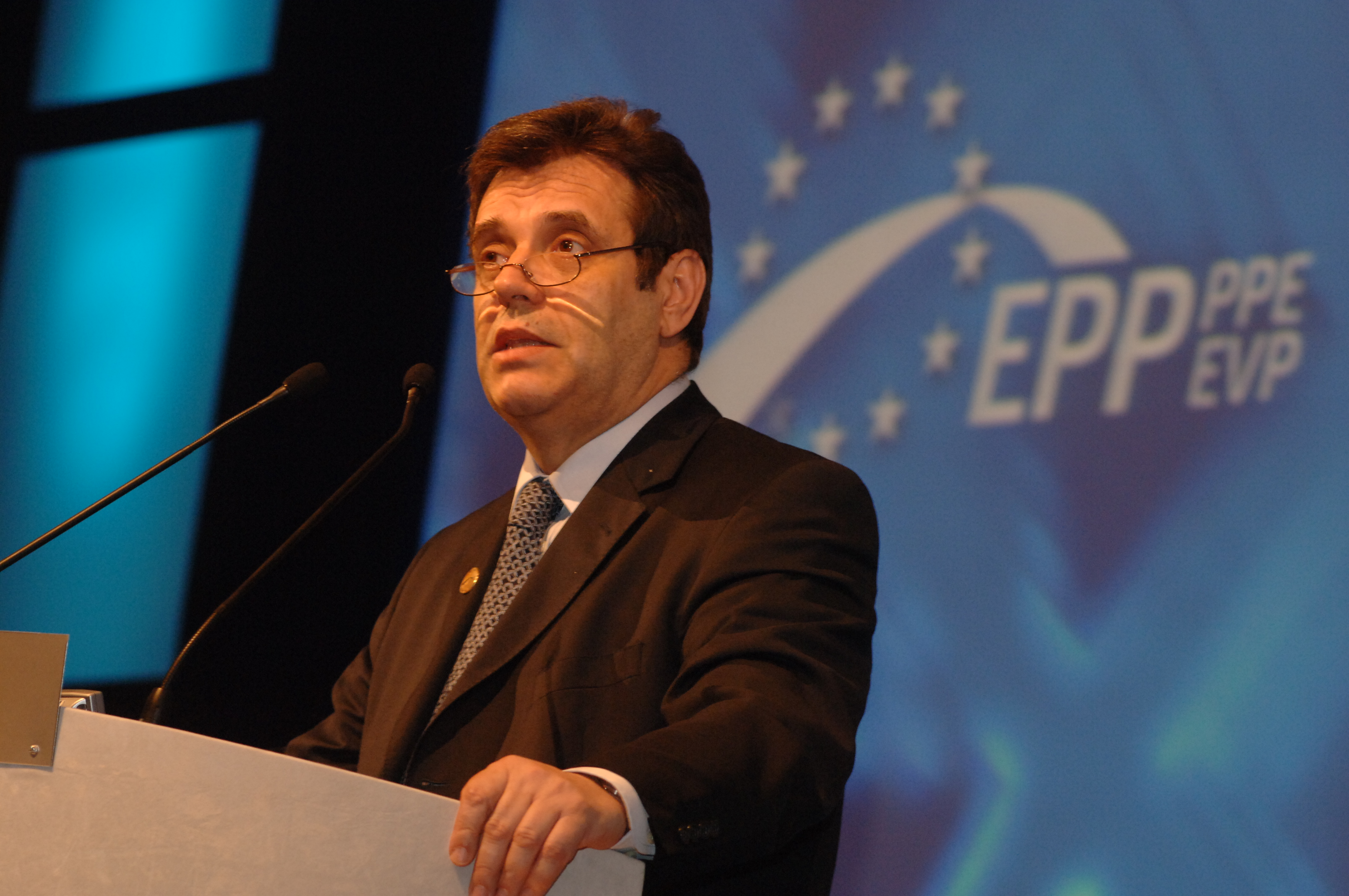
Vojislav Koštunica, founder and the first president of the party

The DSS first competed in the December 1992 parliamentary elections. As part of DEPOS, the DSS received 18 seats in the National Assembly of Serbia, which grew to 20 after non-party-aligned members of DEPOS decided to leave the Parliament. Soon, similar differences of opinion over ways in which to fight the ruling Socialist Party of Serbia and the DSS's belief in Serbian nationalism led to a division in DEPOS too. The DSS left the coalition in mid-1993.

Snap parliamentary elections were held on 19 December 1993, in which DSS ran independently and won seven seats. This was a period of the party's political stagnation as most nationalist votes went to the Serbian Radical Party. It did not have enough seats to significantly influence matters in Serbia and was left without representation in the Federal Assembly.

In 1996, the opposition Zajedno (Together) coalition was formed. DSS entered the 1996 federal parliamentary elections as part of the coalition and won four seats in the Federal Assembly.

=== 2000–2008 ===
The DSS was a founding member of the Democratic Opposition of Serbia (DOS), whose presidential candidate, DSS leader Vojislav Koštunica, defeated Slobodan Milošević in the 2000 Yugoslav presidential election held on 24 September 2000 winning 50.24% of the vote.

In the December 2000 Serbian parliamentary election, the Democratic Opposition of Serbia won 64.7% of the popular vote, securing 176 seats in the National Assembly. The DSS was allocated 45 seats. In the ensuing Democratic Opposition of Serbia coalition government, DSS had very little influence with just two cabinet-level ministerial posts, that of Deputy Prime Minister (held by Aleksandar Pravdić) and Minister of Health (held by Obren Joksimović) as well as very few second tier posts of Deputy Minister. The DSS was unhappy with the direction of the DOS Government policy and split from the coalition in late 2001.

In the 2003 parliamentary election, the DSS won 17.96% of the popular vote, translating into 53 seats in the parliament. Of these 53 seats, three went to the People's Democratic Party (NDS), one to the Serbian Liberal Party and one to the Serbian Democratic Party (SDS).

In 2004 NDS left the coalition with DSS, leaving it with 50 seats in the National Assembly. However, in 2005 both the NDS and the SDS merged into the DSS, bringing its size to 52 seats in the National Assembly.

The DSS won 47 seats in coalition with New Serbia in the 2007 parliamentary election, receiving 667,615 votes, or 16.83% of the popular vote. DSS itself received 33 seats in the parliament, and formed a group together with New Serbia, the Serbian Democratic Renewal Movement and United Serbia.

The leader of the DSS since its foundation, Vojislav Koštunica, was the Prime Minister of Serbia between March 2004 and July 2008 heading up two coalition governments. The first coalition government between March 2004 and July 2007 in coalition with Serbian Renewal Movement and G17 Plus. The second coalition government between July 2007 and July 2008 in coalition with the Democratic Party and G17 Plus.

=== 2008–2014 ===
In the early 2008 parliamentary election held in May 2008 following the self-proclaimed declaration of independence by the Serbian province of Kosovo, the DSS won 30 seats in the National Assembly in coalition with New Serbia. It won 480,987 votes, or 11.87% of the popular vote. In coalition with New Serbia 2008–10, it formed the second largest opposition block in the Serbian parliament.

Since 2008 the DSS has positioned itself as a staunch defender of the premise that Kosovo should remain within Serbia (in some shape or form) and that further negotiations must take place to determine a workable political outcome regarding Kosovo and Serbia. Because of this approach, the DSS is against Serbia joining the EU if in return it is bound to acknowledge the legitimacy of the self-proclaimed independent Kosovo.

The party has become increasingly nationalist and eurosceptic since the independence of Kosovo. In 2012, Koštunica stated that the EU was destroying Serbia and that Serbia should give up on EU membership. The party subsequently left the European People's Party in February 2012.

The party competed independently in the 2012 parliamentary elections in May 2012 and received 7.32% of the popular vote (273,532 votes), winning 21 seats.

=== 2014–2021 ===
In 2014, Koštunica, the party's founder and first president, left the party over its abandonment of the idea of political neutrality. Subsequently, Slobodan Samardžić, Dragan Jočić, Vladeta Janković and Dejan Mihajlov also announced their departure in response to differences of opinion over the course of DSS.

=== 2021–present ===
On 26 January 2021, DSS and the Movement for the Restoration of the Kingdom of Serbia (POKS) signed an agreement on joint action and agreed on a joint political-program platform called the National-Democratic Alternative. In early May, the National-Democratic Alternative was transformed into a pre-electoral coalition. On 24 May, the 14th party assembly was held in which Jovanović was re-elected as the president of the party, while Dejan Šulkić, Zoran Sandić, and Predrag Marsenić were elected as vice-presidents. DSS changed its name to New Democratic Party of Serbia following the 15th assembly on 29 May 2022. In April 2026, POKS left the NADA coalition and formed its own parliamentary group.

In the 2026 snap parliamentary election, NDSS ran together with the Monarchists under the name "Authentic Right", with Jovanović as ballot carrier. According to preliminary results from the Republic Electoral Commission, with 96.9% of polling stations processed, the list won 38,286 votes (0.9%), well below the 3% electoral threshold, leaving NDSS without seats in the National Assembly for the first time since 2020. On election night, Jovanović took full responsibility for the result and congratulated the Student List on its victory. The following day, he announced that he was resigning as party president and withdrawing from public life.

== Political positions ==
Initially aligned on the centre-right on the political spectrum, it shifted to the right in the early 2010s. A national-conservative party, it is strongly opposed to the accession of Serbia to the European Union. It has been also described as conservative, nationalist, and populist. It was historically supportive of Western integration and European Union, and was a member of the European People's Party until 2012.

Together with the People's Party, Serbian Party Oathkeepers, and Dveri, it signed a joint declaration for the "reintegration of Kosovo into the constitutional and legal order of Serbia" in October 2022.

In the Parliamentary Assembly of the Council of Europe, DSS was associated with the European People's Party until 2012, after which it became a member of the European Democrat Group until 2014.

== List of presidents ==
#	President		Birth–Death	Term start	Term end
1	Vojislav Koštunica	An image of Vojislav Koštunica in 2001	1944–	26 July 1992	19 March 2014
2	Sanda Rašković Ivić	An image of Sanda Rašković Ivić at Medija centar	1956–	12 October 2014	2 August 2016
3	Miloš Jovanović	An image of Miloš Jovanović in 2023	1976–	21 December 2016	Incumbent

=== Acting leaders ===
Ref:

Name	Birth–Death	Term start	Term end
Aleksandar Popović	1971–	19 March 2014	12 October 2014
Dragan Maršićanin	1950–	2 August 2016	21 December 2016

== Electoral performance ==
=== Parliamentary elections ===
National Assembly of Serbia
Year	Leader	Popular vote	% of popular vote	#	# of seats	Seat change	Coalition	Status
1992	Vojislav Koštunica	797,831	17.98%	▲3rd	18 / 250	▲18	DEPOS	Opposition
1993	Vojislav Koštunica	218,056	5.29%	▼5th	7 / 250	▼11	–	Opposition
1997	Vojislav Koštunica	Election boycott			0 / 250	▼7	–	Extra-parliamentary
2000	Vojislav Koštunica	2,404,758	65.69%	▲1st	45 / 250	▲45	DOS	Government 2000–01
2000	Vojislav Koštunica	2,404,758	65.69%	▲1st	45 / 250	▲45	–	Opposition 2001–04
2003	Vojislav Koštunica	678,031	17.96%	▼2nd	53 / 250	▲8	DSS–SLS	Government
2007	Vojislav Koštunica	667,615	16.83%	▼3rd	33 / 250	▼20	DSS–NS–JS–SDPO	Government
2008	Vojislav Koštunica	480,987	11.87%	3rd	21 / 250	▼12	DSS–NS	Opposition
2012	Vojislav Koštunica	273,532	7.32%	▼4th	21 / 250	0	–	Opposition
2014	Vojislav Koštunica	152,436	4.38%	▼5th	0 / 250	▼21	–	Extra-parliamentary
2016	Sanda Rašković Ivić	190,530	5.19%	▼6th	6 / 250	▲6	DSS–Dveri	Opposition
2020	Miloš Jovanović	72,085	2.32%	6th	0 / 250	▼6	Metla 2020	Extra-parliamentary
2022	Miloš Jovanović	204,444	5.54%	▲4th	7 / 250	▲7	NADA	Opposition
2023	Miloš Jovanović	191,431	5.16%	4th	7 / 250	0	NADA	Opposition
2026	Miloš Jovanović	39,503	0.90%	4th	0 / 250	▼7	AD	Extra-parliamentary

View source data.

=== Presidential elections ===
President of Serbia
Year	Candidate	1st round popular vote		% of popular vote	2nd round popular vote		% of popular vote	Notes
1992	Milan Panić	2nd	1,516,693	34.65%	—N/a	—	—	Supported Panić, an independent candidate
Sep 1997	Election boycott							Election annulled due to low turnout
Dec 1997	Election boycott							
Sep–Oct 2002	Vojislav Koštunica	1st	1,123,420	31.56%	1st	1,991,947	68.38%	Election annulled due to low turnout
Dec 2002	Vojislav Koštunica	1st	1,699,098	59.28%	—N/a	—	—	Election annulled due to low turnout
2003	Election boycott							Election annulled due to low turnout
2004	Dragan Maršićanin	4th	414,971	13.47%	—N/a	—	—	
2008	Velimir Ilić	3rd	305,828	7.57%	—N/a	—	—	Supported Ilić
2012	Vojislav Koštunica	4th	290,861	7.79%	—N/a	—	—	
2017	Aleksandar Popović	10th	38,167	1.06%	—N/a	—	—	
2022	Miloš Jovanović	3rd	226,137	6.10%	—N/a	—	—	

== Positions held ==
Major positions held by members of the party:

President of FR Yugoslavia	Years
Vojislav Koštunica	2000–2003
Prime Minister of Serbia	Years
Vojislav Koštunica	2004–2008
President of the Assembly of Serbia and Montenegro	Years
Zoran Šami	2004–2006
President of the National Assembly of Serbia	Years
Dragan Maršićanin	2001; 2004

== Notable members ==
- Vojislav Koštunica
- Aleksandar Popović
- Slobodan Samardžić
- Aleksandar Pravdić
- Dragan Jočić
- Miloš Aligrudić
- Radomir Naumov
- Dragan Maršićanin
- Predrag Bubalo
- Vladeta Janković
- Draško Petrović
- Mirko Petrović
- Đurđe Ninković
- Milan Parivodić
- Vladan Batić
- Bora Đorđević
- Dušan Prelević
- Nenad Popović
- Branislav Ristivojević

== See also ==
- Politics of Serbia
- List of political parties in Serbia
