= Mihailo Petrović =

Mihailo Petrović or Mihajlo Petrović may refer to:

- Mihailo Petrović Alas (1868–1943), Serbian mathematician and inventor
- Mihailo Petrović (footballer) (born 1957), Serbian footballer and coach
- Mihajlo Petrović (pilot), Serbian aviator (1884–1913)
- Mihailo Petrović (basketball) (born 2003), basketball player

== See also ==
- Mihailo Petrović-Njegoš (1908–1986), Prince of Montenegro
