= Draško Petrović =

Serbian politician and businessman

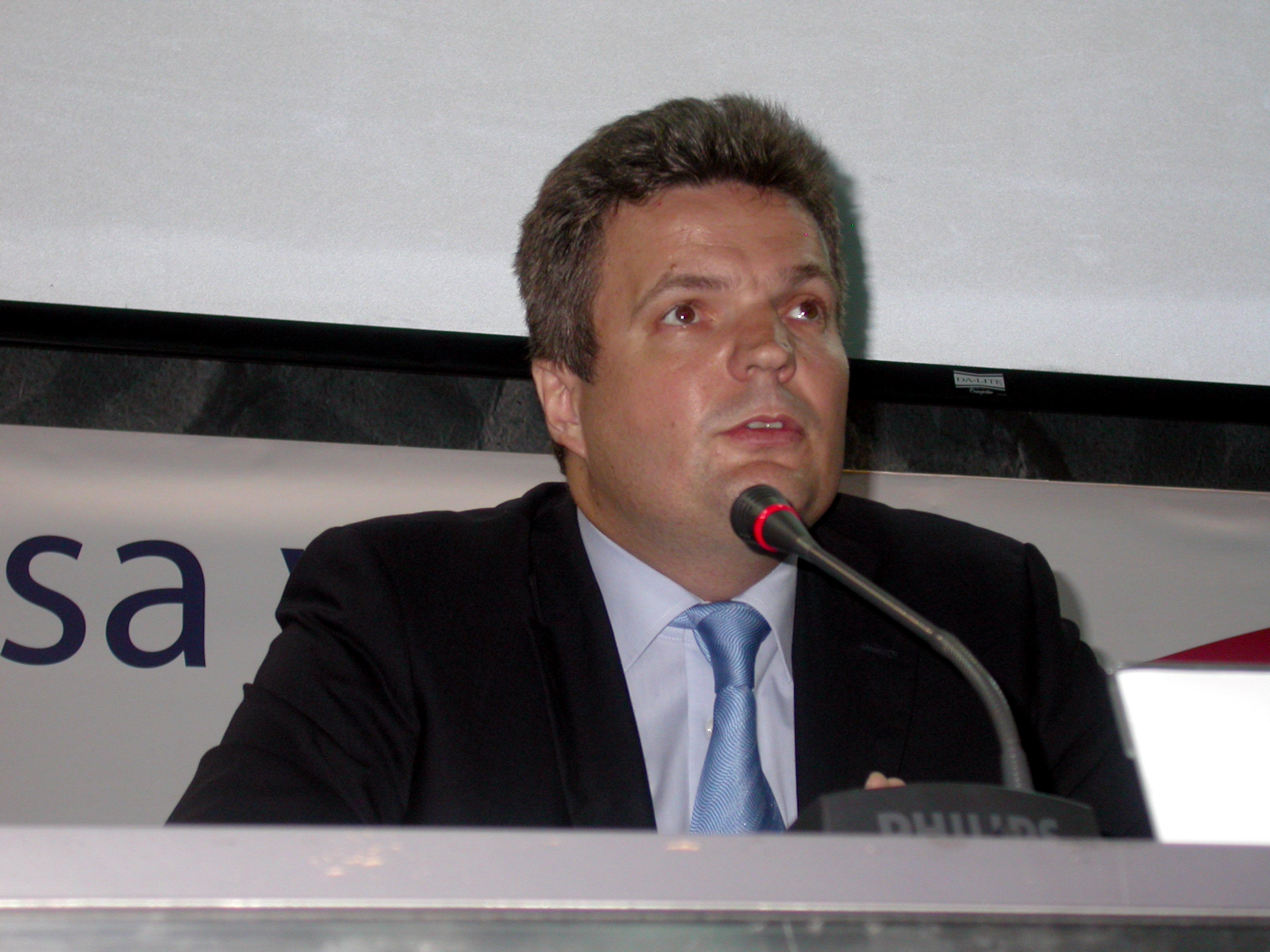
Draško Petrović

Draško Petrović, MSc (Serbian Cyrillic: Драшко Петровић; born 1965) is a Serbian politician and businessman.

== Education ==
Petrović graduated from the University of Belgrade's Law School before going on to obtain a master's degree from the Faculty of Transport at the same university.

== Career ==
=== Political career ===
In May 1990, Petrović became one of the founding members of the Democratic Party's (DS) Youth Wing. In July 1992, he was amongst the group that left DS and led by Vojislav Koštunica founded the Democratic Party of Serbia (DSS). Between 1992 and 1997 he was a Member of the Serbian Parliament on the DSS list as part of the DEPOS coalition.

=== Business career ===
From December 2000 until February 2008, Petrović was the CEO of Telekom Srbija, the biggest telecommunications company in Serbia. He was one of the longest serving CEOs of a state controlled company in Serbia and gained a reputation as an exceptional manager. He was succeeded at the post by Branko Radujko. Since March 2009 Draško has been appointed to the Democratic Party of Serbia (DSS) Economic Advisory Committee.
