= Mirko Petrović (politician) =

Serbian businessman and politician

Mirko Petrović (Serbian Cyrillic: Мирко Петровић; born 1965) is a Serbian businessman, sports executive and former politician. He was the CEO of one of the largest Serbian companies, the Dunav Insurance Company.

== Biography ==
He was a member of the Founding Committee of the Democratic Party in December 1989. He was the youngest Member of Parliament of Serbia, elected on the Democratic Party list in December 1990, and was an elected member of the Executive Committee and the General Committee of the Democratic Party (1990–92).

He then left the Democratic Party with the pro-DEPOS coalition wing and was one of the founders of the Democratic Party of Serbia (DSS) in July 1992. He was elected Chairman of the DSS Executive Committee between 1992 and 1996 and was elected the Deputy Chairman of the DSS (1996-1998). He was an MP in the National Assembly of Serbia on the Democratic Party of Serbia list between 1992 and 1997.

In December 2000 he was appointed the Federal Secretary for Legislation within the Government of Yugoslavia. After the dissolution of Yugoslavia into the State Union of Serbia and Montenegro he became the General Manager of the Legal Service to the Council of Ministers of Serbia and Montenegro.

Between February 2004 and February 2009 he was the CEO of the Dunav osiguranje insurance company, the largest insurance company in Serbia. In 2009 he was a member of the Democratic Party of Serbia (DSS) Economic Advisory Committee. Between 2010 and 2014 he was one of the directors of the National Bank of Serbia. In the summer of 2014 the Serbian Government appointed him as CEO of the Dunav Insurance Company for the second time.

Sporting positions
Preceded by Vuk Jeremić	President of the Tennis Federation of Serbia; 2015–present	Succeeded by Incumbent
Preceded by Živorad Anđelković	President of KK Crvena zvezda 2005–2008	Succeeded by Slobodan Vučićević
