= Branislav Kojić =

Branislav Đ. Kojić (1899-1987) was a Serbian architect, ruralist and painter.

== Biography ==
He was born on 5 June 1899 to a family of teachers in Smederevo, Serbia.

Kojić's early schooling was completed in Belgrade. In 1915, he found himself in France as a war refugee. He entered the French lycée in Poitiers, and later moved to the southern city of Nice, completing his studies there in 1917. He then moved north and enrolled in the École Centrale des Arts et Manufactures in Paris, where he was awarded a degree in architecture in 1921. He then obtained a position in the Ministry of Infrastructure in Belgrade and received his architectural license in 1926. Also, in 1926 he decided to design a unique family house for him and his wife who was also an architect and an interior decorator. In 1928, with his wife Danica, he established a bureau of certified architects. In the same year, he founded the Group of Architects of the Modern Direction, which together with him also included Milan Zloković, Jan Dubovi, and Dušan Babić.

Over the course of his long career, he built more than 100 buildings, some of which are now landmarks of Belgrade and Serbia, namely the Cvijeta Zuzorić Pavilion.

He was one of the first Serbian modernist architects who was influenced by art deco.

In 1950, he became a full professor at the Faculty of Architecture, University of Belgrade, at the Department of Designing Commercial and Industrial Buildings. Five years later he became a Corresponding Member, and in 1963 a regular member of SANU (Serbian Academy of Sciences and Arts. He retired in 1965. Kojić died in 1987 and is buried in the Alley of the Greats at Novo Groblje in Belgrade.
