= Kuridža's Rebellion =

Peasant rebellion in 1704 against taxation

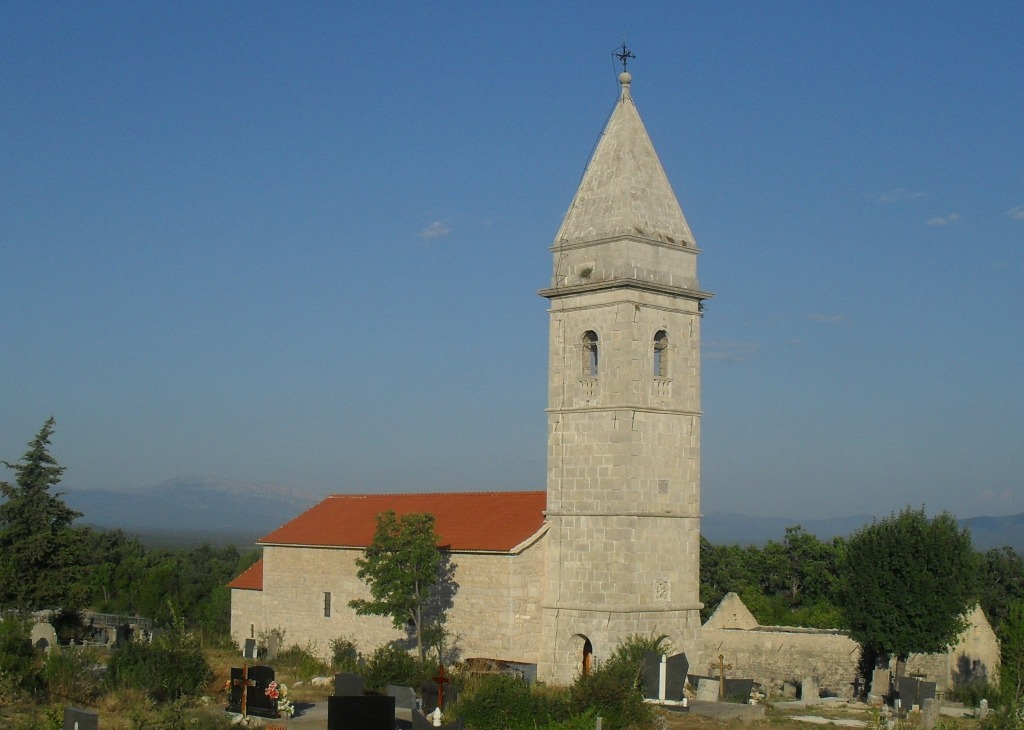
- The Serbian Orthodox church in Biovičino Selo, where rebel leader Petar Jagodić was the parish priest.
| Date | 1704 |
| Location | Venetian Dalmatia (now the Dalmatian hinterlands, Croatia) |
| Result | Rebellion suppressed |

Belligerents
| Orthodox peasants | Republic of Venice |

Commanders and leaders
| Petar Jagodić; Ilija Nanić; Matija Žabetić and 67 others | Marino Zane |

Strength
| 7,000 | |

Kuridža's Rebellion (Croatian: Kuridžina buna, Serbian: Куриџина буна/Kuridžina buna) was a rebellion against the Republic of Venice due to taxation on newly conquered territory, which included a large peasant Orthodox Christian (Serb) population, led by Serbian Orthodox priest Petar Jagodić - "Kuridža" (1666–1749) in Bukovica and Ravni kotari (in the Dalmatian hinterland of Croatia) that took place in 1704.

The Venetian government implemented a tax of a tenth of yield on all lands that were conquered from the Ottoman Empire with the Great Turkish War (1683–99). With special decrees or investments, lands were assigned to natural and legal persons, with regular payment of an annual tenth collected by tenants. The tenth (Serbian: desetina) was introduced in Venetian Dalmatia during the Morean War around 1690.

Serbian Orthodox priest Petar Jagodić organized the poor population in a rebellion against Venetian taxation. Breaking out in Bukovica, it eventually expanded into Ravni kotari. Apart from Kuridža, Žegar chieftain Ilija Nanić and Biograd chieftain Matija Žabetić were also involved. Despite Kuridža's calling to the population of the Knin, Drniš, Skradin and Šibenik areas to rise up, the rebellion did not expand eastwards from the Krka river. The rebels attacked the tax collectors, and also those who did not join the rebellion. Food imports from the Zadar hinterlands to the cities were banned, and money was collected from the people for the needs of further rebellion. Venetian provveditore generale (general-governor) of Dalmatia, Marino Zane, was at the time of the outbreak at Split. He ordered his deputy, the captain of Zadar, to make threats of the most severe punishment and invite the rebels to stop violence and present their problems to the authorities. Responding to the invitation, some 7,000 armed rebels under the leadership of some seventy village chieftains arrived outside Zadar and called the Kotari colonel and count Posedarski, and the serdars Radasović, Smiljanić and Spingaroli to negotiate at Crno. After the talks, Zane received a report from the serdars, after which he sent them back to threaten the rebels with the most severe punishments. The Venetian government had insufficient armed forces in Dalmatia to suppress the rebellion; Zane through calling the rebel chieftains individually and gradually to negotiate in Split, where these were given various promises, won overall chieftains except Kuridža, Nanić and Žabetić, who retreated to Lika. Zane ended his office as governor of Dalmatia in 1705, succeeded by Justinian da Riva. Kuridža, from exile, contacted governor Riva and requested him to hear the exiles. After receiving the three leaders, they were allowed to return home and were left in peace. However, the next governor Vincenzo Vendramino issued for the arrest of Kuridža in 1706 and threw him in jail for the next decades. Nanić and Žabetić were pardoned, most likely due to Venice needing them for future wars with the Ottomans. Kuridža died shortly after his release in old age.

The events are included in the historical novel Most uzdisaja (Bridge of Sighs) by Yugoslav author Mirko Žeželj. A poem dedicated to him is included in Put Morlaka (2013).

== See also ==
- Janko Mitrović (1613–1659), Morlach leader
- Stojan Janković (1636–1687), Morlach leader
- Ilija Perajica, Morlach leader
- Stanislav Sočivica, Venetian rebel
- Sinobad
- Cvijan Šarić
- Petronije Selaković
- Bajo Pivljanin
- Grujica Žeravica
- Vukosav Puhalović
- Ilija Smiljanić
- Petar Smiljanić
- Vuk Močivuna
- Juraj Vranić
- Tadije Vranić
- Matija Žabetić
- Ilija Nanić

== Annotations ==
1. Petar Jagodić Kuridža (Serbian Cyrillic: Петар Јагодић Куриџа; ca. 1666–4 April 1749) was a Serbian Orthodox priest, the parish priest seated at the Orthodox church of Biovičino Selo. He was born in the village of Bilišane (now in Obrovac, Croatia). His nickname is derived from kaur-hodža, a Turkish derogatory term for Christian priests.

== Sources ==
Books

- Bajić, Nataša (2007). Tetralogija našeg porekla: zavičajni zbornik Bukovice, Severne Dalmacije, Mokrog Polja i jedne porodice. N. Bajić. ISBN 978-86-910399-0-5.
- Barriot, Patrick; Crépin, Eve (1995). On assassine un peuple: les Serbes de Krajina. l'Age d'Homme. pp. 19–. ISBN 978-2-8251-0674-7.
- Desnica, Boško (1991). Stojan Janković i uskočka Dalmacija: izbrani radovi. Srpska književna zadruga. pp. 248–. ISBN 978-86-379-0251-5.
- Hrabak, Bogomil (1953). Smiljanići od Zadra sokoli. Prosveta. pp. 60–.
- Jačov, Marko (1984). Венеција и Срби у Далмацији у XVIII веку. Просвета. pp. 14–.
- Kostić, Lazo M. (1990). Sporne teritorije Srba i Hrvata. Dosije. p. 102. ISBN 978-86-81563-11-3.
- Lalić, Sredoje (2005). Сеоба срба у Руско царство половином 18. века. Српско-украјинско друштво. pp. 53–. ISBN 9788690249930.
- Mandić, Ljupče (2010). Књига о Кистањама. Vol. 1. ISBN 978-86-83809-61-5.
- Mayhew, Tea (2008). Dalmatia Between Ottoman and Venetian Rule: Contado Di Zara, 1645–1718. Viella. pp. 86, 246–248. ISBN 978-88-8334-334-6.
- Mrđa, Nikolaj (1989). Kosovska narodna čitanka 1989: Dalmatinsko Kosovo. Dalmatinska eparhija SPC, Odbor za proslavu Šestogodišnjice kosovske bitke i mučeničkog prestavljanja sv. Kneza Lazara kosovskih mučenika.
- Protić, Milisav D. (1970). Dalmatinski episkop Simeon Končarević i njegovo doba: Spomenica o 200-godišnjici njegove smrti (1769–1969). Srpska pravoslavna Eparhija dalmatinska. pp. 10–.
- Radojčić, Jovan S. (2009). Срби западно од Дунава и Дрине: А-З. Прометеј. ISBN 978-86-515-0315-6.
- Samardžić, Radovan (1986). "Куриџина буна". Istorija srpskog naroda: pt. 1. Srbi u XVIII veku. Srpska knjiiževna zadruga. pp. 24–.
- Veselinović, Rajko L. (1966). Istorija srpske pravoslavne crkve sa narodnom istorijom. Sv. Arh. Sinod Srpske pravoslavne crkve. ISBN 9788672950199.
- Žeželj, Mirko (2004). Most uzdisaja. Knin; Belgrade: Зора; Удружење Срба из Хрватске. ISBN 978-86-83809-13-4.
  - Medić, Mile (2004). "Буна и ропство попа Петра Јагодића Куриџе". Most uzdisaja. pp. 5–17.
- Владић-Крстић, Братислава (2006). Традиционална култура Срба у Српској Крајини и у Хрватској. Етнографски музеј. ISBN 978-86-7891-029-6.

Journals

- Aleksandar Petrov; Dragiša Vitošević (1990). Prilozi za istoriju srpske književne periodike. Vol. 4. Matica srpska. ISBN 978-86-7095-012-2.
- Desnica, Boško (November 1935). "Једна непозната буна и један незнани мученик". Магазин сјеверне Далмације. Сплит: 47–57.
- Računica, Aleksije (2003). "Разлози сеобе Срба из Далмације у Руско царство током 18. вијека" (PDF). Сеоба Срба у Руско царство половином 18. века: 52–65.
- Almanah (PDF). Zagreb: Savez udruženja pravoslavnog sveštenstva SR Hrvatske. 1971.
- Martyrdom of the Serbs. Serbian Eastern Orthodox Diocese for the United States of America and Canada. 1943. pp. 6–.
- Series Historia et sociologia. Zgodovinsko društvo za južno Primorsko. 2001.
- Balkan Studies. Institute for Balkan Studies. 1974.
