= Ilija Perajica =

Ilija Peraica (Italian: Elia Peraizza, 1685), was a Venetian Dalmatian harambaša (bandit leader), with the title of serdar, one of the commanders of the Morlach troops that participated in the Great Turkish War.

== Life ==
According to Venetian documents, his large family (clan) was listed as Morlachs. The clan inhabited large territories of Dalmatia, mostly centered on Zadar and Šibenik. They had their own parochial constitution (according to the document from 1611 first mentioned and listed by the Parish Zmino in the register of the priest Bonaventure Biloglava from 1679 and 1686). Venetian documents claim the "people of Peraizza" having 400 men-at-arms at the moment but were able to mobilize about 1,400 more.

Peraica escaped from a Turkish prison and in 1685, with 1,600 soldiers and people from the Cetina district, started an uprising. He collaborated with the Republic of Venice against the Turks, thus changing the entire course of the Morean War. earning the title of the "sardar" and Venetian recognition of his rule over the liberated territory.

Recent research indicates that in autumn 1685 provveditore generale Pietro Valier gave a large part of land around Zadar and Šibenik to "the new Morlach subjects from Lika and their harambasas Nakić (Nachich) and Peraica (Peraiza) although he doubted their intentions and had previously conducted long negotiations with them. (...)". Still, according to Venetian documents, Peraica was given rule to share with fellow hajduk Stojan Janković.

He died while fighting Ottomans at Rogoznica (1685).

== Peraizza family name ==
Notably, another Peraizza, Francesco (Frano Peraica) was an official Venetian representative in Split around 1675. There might be confusion over the family name as it was written in four different ways in different documents (Peraizza, Peraiza, Perajica, Peraica) and by different governments. Today several variants of the name can still be found in Dalmatia.

== See also ==
- Morlachs
- Morlachs (Venetian irregulars)
- Vuk Mandušić (fl. 1648), military commander in Venetian service
- Stojan Janković (1636–1687), Morlach leader
- Stanislav Sočivica, Venetian rebel
- Sinobad
- Cvijan Šarić
- Petronije Selaković
- Bajo Pivljanin
- Grujica Žeravica
- Vukosav Puhalović
- Ilija Smiljanić
- Petar Smiljanić
- Vuk Močivuna
- Juraj Vranić
- Tadije Vranić
