= Janko Mitrović =

- Born: 1613
- Died: 1659 (aged 45–46); Cetina
- Military career
- Allegiance: Republic of Venice
- Service years: 1645-1659
- Rank: harambaša
- Unit: Morlach Venetian irregular group
- Conflicts: Cretan War (1645–1669)

Janko Mitrović (Serbian Cyrillic: Јанко Митровић; 1613–1659) was a harambaša (Ottoman for "bandit leader"), and the commander of the Morlach army, in the service of the Republic of Venice, from 1648 until his death in 1659. He participated in the Cretan War (1645–69), alongside Ilija Smiljanić, as the supreme commanders of the Venetian Morlach troops, of which he is enumerated in Croatian and Serb epic poetry (as Janko of Kotari, Јанко од Котара). His son, Stojan Janković, followed in his father's footsteps.

== Life ==
Janko was the son of Mitar (born c. 1585), whose family hailed from the villages of Zelengrad or Žegar in the area of Bukovica. Janko had brothers Jovan, Stjepan, Pavle, and Andrija, and probably was among the youngest brothers. Vukadin Mitrović was also a harambaša in Venetian service, possibly another brother, or a cousin.

Mitrović in 1646 was recorded as a defender of Šibenik, and in 1649 was rewarded with a monthly payment of 4 ducats. Stojan, who was Janko's eldest son, began fighting alongside him and Ilija Smiljanić early on, in the Cretan War (1645–69). Ilija, as the more experienced, was named serdar in 1648 after his father, serdar Petar Smiljanić had died. In 1648, when the Ottoman army took their village, the Mitrovići and 70 other Žegar families settled in the small village of Budin near Posedarje, under Venetian control. In January 1654, with 100 horsemen and 150 other soldiers prevented Ottoman's destruction of Posedarje for which was rewarded by the authorities. After the death of Filip Smiljanić, in 1656 was named as a serdar. Under his command were people of Ražanac, Vinjerac, Ljubač, Posedarje, Novigrad, Krmpoćani, as well controlled two cols at Old Obrovac

In February 1659, near the Cetina river, both leaders Janko and Ilija Smiljanić succumb to wounds after battling the Turks. Janko was buried on 28 February 1659 in the Catholic church of St. Elias in Zadar, which was until the mid-18th century part of the parish of the Zadar Cathedral, in which death registers were kept at that time. Janko's wife was Antonija, and they had three sons, Stojan, Ilija and Zaviša, and a daughter Ana. According to one document, stating that they had many people of the same confession faithful to the Roman Church, it is argued that they were Roman Catholics.

== Notes ==
1. Based on 1930s work Kotarske narodne pjesme by Stjepan Grčić was argued the consideration that Mitrovići originate from Žegar, however, modern days Croatian historians argues that this probably was a wrong translation of Venetian documents which said of and toward Žegar as an area and not village, which included parts of Pozrmanja, Bukovica, and Zelengrad. Mitrovići never lived in Žegar. According to latest theory, based on tradition recorded by Andrija Kačić Miošić, Mitrovići were a branch of Kačić noble family, whose member Gašpar was a grandson of Mitar who lived in Vrana (branch called Kačić-Mitrović), and as Janković's family was related to the same place by Miošić, hence the branch was called Mitrovići. This theory is supported by the fact the area was mostly inhabited by a Catholic population, and the Mitrović's family was therefore declared Catholic by some sources. On the contrary other historic sources speak of the Mitrović family being of Serb Orthodox heritage. This is also backed up with the fact that the Mitrović family was Serbian Orthodox and Janko's son Stojan in 1675 commissioned the building of a Serbian Orthodox Church in the name of Saint George (Đurđevdan was slava of family of Stojan Janković). This church was built on the families estate in village Islam Grčki. According to another thought, Mitar and eponymous founder of the family, had come from the Dinara mountain, and therefor most probably was not Croatian.

== See also ==
- Vuk Mandušić (fl. 1648), military commander in Venetian service
- Stojan Janković (1636–1687), Morlach leader
- Ilija Perajica, Morlach leader
- Stanislav Sočivica, Venetian rebel
- Sinobad
- Cvijan Šarić
- Petronije Selaković
- Bajo Pivljanin
- Grujica Žeravica
- Vukosav Puhalović
- Ilija Smiljanić

Military offices
Preceded by Ilija Smiljanić	Morlach commander Republic of Venice; 1645-1659	Succeeded by Stojan Janković
