= Gusić family =

Croatian noble family

Gusić
- Croatian & Hungarian noble family
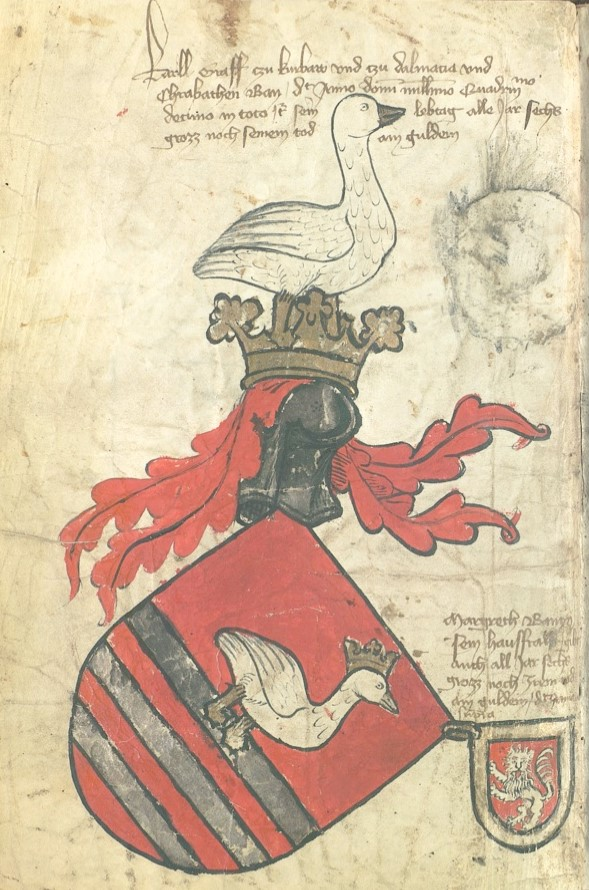
- Coat of arms from Wiener handschrift (1410)
- Country: Vassal to Kingdom of Croatia (1102–1526); Vassal to Kingdom of Hungary (1102–1526)
- Etymology: Guska (Croatian): "goose"
- Founded: 11th century
- Titles: Župan, Knez, Comes, Count, Graf, Baron, Ban
- Traditions: Roman Catholic
- Estate: List: Posedarje, Krbava
- Cadet branches: List: Posedarski, Kurjaković, Turanski, Izačić, Oštriharić, Krčelić

The Gusić family, also known as Gušić, was one of the twelve noble tribes of the Kingdom of Croatia, mentioned in the Pacta conventa. They originated from the hinterland of Biograd in the medieval Luka and Sidraga županijas, where they are recorded at least since the 11th century. Their main regions of influence were Krbava and Gacka, where they often served as župans and knezes at least since the early 13th century. In the 14th century branched Posedarski who seated in Posedarje, and Kurjakovići who as magnates managed to gather much wealth and have high official positions at the Hungarian royal court as well two of their members became Ban of Croatia. As experienced warriors, they actively participated in the Croatian–Ottoman and late Ottoman–Venetian Wars. Direct descendants of the tribe with the surname Gusić, and possibly Gušić, (Note: It is unclear whether people with the surname variation Gušić descend from the Gusić tribe as the surname is present in Montenegro, possibly from the Rovčani tribe. The relationship to Dobrašin Gušić (1412), and Miobrat Gušić (1424) from Popovo in Herzegovina who served nobleman Grgur Nikolić, is also unknown.) live even today in Croatia and Slovenia.

== Etymology ==
The family name Gus(-ić) most probably derives from the Slavic guska (goose). They possibly got it from a goose which is displayed on their family coat of arms, or rather the coat of arms was chosen to describe their already existing family name. Vladimir Mažuranić noted it is similar to the name of a prominent Hungarian noble Guz or Gus from 1096 and derived it from gusa ("marauding", "banditry", "brigandage"). According to minor theory by B. Gušić, it derives from tribes of Guduscani and župa "Gūtzēkă" (possibly Gacka). In the sources they are referred as de generatione Gussichorum, de genere Gusich, de genere Gussich, de genere Gussichorum, de genere Gussithorum, Dussigh, Gusich, Gusichy, Gusigh, Gusik, Gusiki, Gussich, Gussichi, Gussichius, Gussigh, Gusych, Gwzych, natione Gussikiorum. The family name can be found in the toponyms of Gusić polje ("Gusić field"), where is Gusić jezero ("Gusić lake"), above which once stood Gusić-grad ("Gusić fort"), probably near Brlog.

== Coat of arms ==
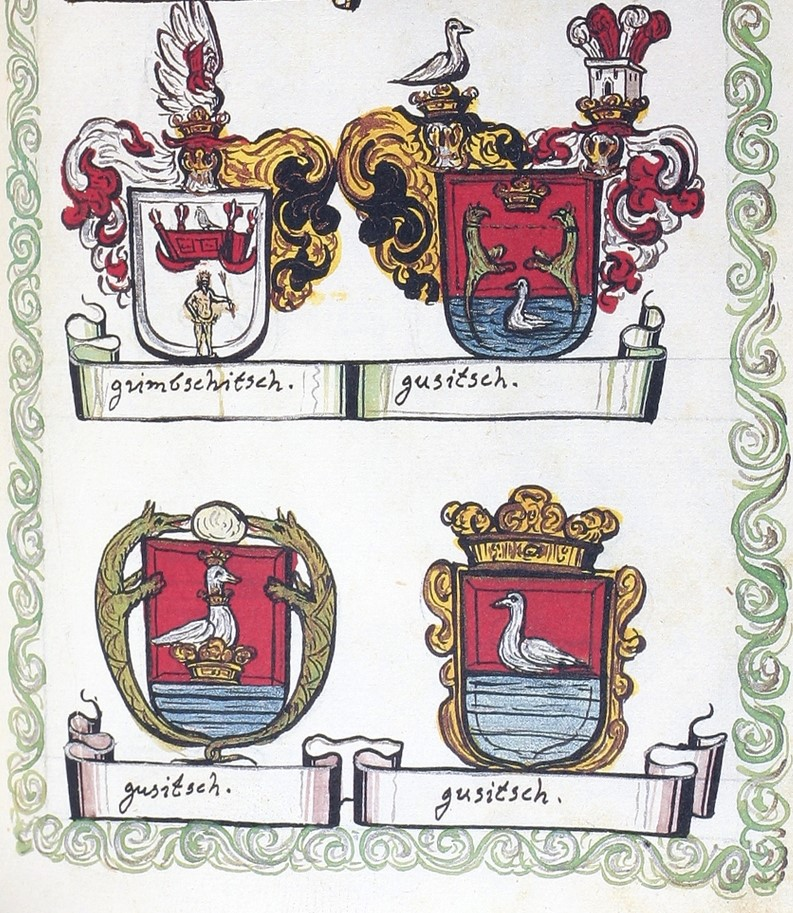
The family's coat of arms (top right, bottom), from Opus insignium armorumque (1687–1688) by Johann Weikhard von Valvasor.

Their heraldry appeared at least in 1278 (or 1367), and is one of the oldest Croatian coat of arms with a signature of a noble family. The faint trace of the seal of Gregorii comitis Corbauienssis had an image of a shield with a goose and outside of it two dragons. According to heraldist Bartol Zmajić, initially it probably had a red shield on which are three horizontal silver bars and on the top of it a crowned goose. These characteristics as a symbol of ancestry can be found in the coat of arms of younger noble families Izačić and Oštriharić.

The earliest depiction of Kurjaković's coat of arms is from German armorials Wiener handschrift, where is included in 1410 COA of Graff Karl Kurjaković the Ban of Dalmatia and Croatia, and Livro de Arautor written and painted by an anonymous Portuguese herald between 1416–1417, where is included COA of Graff Thomas Kurjaković. According to them the coat of arms was red with three or four silver diagonal-horizontal bars, on the first upper bar standing a goose, sometimes gold-reinforced and crowned. The helmet is silver, the mantle is red, with ornamental having a standing goose, sometimes crowned, on a golden crown. In the first had a small chain link with a certain alliance coat of arms with a lion, and there was a shaved wreath-shaped sign with possibly a dragon. The family's heraldry is also described in the Jörg Rugen's Wappenbuch from 1493–1499, as belonging to the Graff von Krawaten. In 1492 and 1527, Kurjaković's also on their seal had a goose inside a shield, with the one from 1492 more detailed having three bars and on the upper, a crowned goose facing right with a crown around a neck.

Due to this marriage relationships, the coat of arms of both Kurjaković and Lapčan family was united and by female line became part of the Austrian-Bavarian noble family of Sinzendorf since the 17th century. Since 1646 the coat of arms can be also found engraved at University of Padua as a memory of Nikola Posedarski's University's studying. Several variations of the coat of arms of Carniolan noble branch, and as part of complex COA of noble families Sizendorf and Saleburg, featured in Opus insignium armorumque (1687–1688) by Johann Weikhard von Valvasor. One of the variations, with two dragons outside the shield and inside it a goose with a crown on head, neck, and feet, was described by Samuel Timon in 1736 and allegedly was on the tombstone of Ivan Karlović (died 1531). The Gusić family coat of arms also featured on the left side of COA of the former Lika-Krbava County (1881–1920) of Kingdom of Croatia-Slavonia.

== History ==
They originally had estates in the hinterland of Biograd in the medieval Luka and Sidraga županija, specifically Kličević, Ceranji, Gušići, Obrovac, and Domakovci. Historians Vjekoslav Klaić and Ferdo Šišić considered they originated from the region of Krbava. Anachronistic is Roman origin from Titus Manlius Imperiosus Torquatus, a thesis argued by Miklós Istvánffy and Pavao Ritter Vitezović.

The first members of the tribe can be followed since the mid-11th century. It is considered that the first known member is Prvaneg, župan of Luka, recorded in the 1060 document of the King Peter Krešimir IV of Croatia, whose office finished before 1066–1067. He had several sons, among whom were Pribina and Jakov Gussichi. Pribina was a member of the Benedictines Monastery of St. Ivan of Rogovo in Biograd, and the gifted lands in Kamenjane by King Krešimir IV in 1070–1074 Pribina gave to the Monastery. His brother Jakov sold some lands in Sidraga to the abbot of the Monastery between 1085–1095. Prvaneg's contemporary was Jure, whose son Thasa probably had a court title of tepčija, and a palace in Raštani which ceded to the Monastery of St. John as well to it sold some estates in Jelčani. It is also recorded Pribineg who sold some estates near the city walls to the Monastery, while his son Andrija between 1070–1076 a vineyard. The Monastery also received some lands from certain Nassemir Gussichius.

According to the anonymous chronicler of Split, probably from the 14th century and recorded by a 17th-century historian from Zadar, Šimun Ljubavac, after the death of King Demetrius Zvonimir of Croatia emerged anarchy. At the time some members of the family already lived in Krbava, where Petar Gusić welcomed Petar de genere Cacautonem who was an envoy of the city of Split to surrender it to Hungarian king Stjepan (actually Ladislaus I of Hungary). They both went to the king, where they presented themselves as "White Croats" (Creates Albi), and offered him rule over Split and Croatian Kingdom, which he accepted and went up to the Gvozd Mountain when returned due to Tatars intrusion. The legend has many mistakes which are contrary to historical sources. With unknown correlation, to the same period is also dated the event which involved župan Paulum de genere Gussithorum, one of the twelve noblemen mentioned in Pacta conventa (1102) who negotiated with Coloman, King of Hungary.

In the sources, they mentioned again at the end of the 12th century regarding land deals of Monastery of St. Kuzma and Damjan near Tkon on Pašman island and Monastery of St. Krševan in Kamenjane. Several of them, including Stjepan, Toliš, Radoš, and Dominik built the church of St. Petar in Bubnjani near Tinj. Comes Slovinja, son of Boricius Gussich (1187), is mentioned in the 1188 royal document of Béla III of Hungary, by which were confirmed estates of Rogovo, Vrbice, and Kamenjane which were given by Croatian Kings Krešimir IV and Zvonimir. It is considered that he became knez of Krbava region between 1207–1222, and owned estate Grabovnik which sold to Hemin from the tribe of Lapčan. His son Dražen in 1181 was also a župan, and a function of pristav when Skradin's bishop Mihajlo awarded the Monastery of St. Dimitrije and Toma seized lands in Bubnjani, while settlement Biljane was owned by Ivan of Juraj. In 1207, Slovinja with brother Grubeša, Radoslav and Dragoslav sons of Stjepan, Iraceo Binboli son of Toliša, Juraj of Radoš, Nikola and Prodanek of Dominik, gave consent to the Monastery of St. Dimitrije and Toma to cede church St. Petar in Bubnjani to the Monastery of St. Kuzma and Damjan.

From a part of the tribe who stayed in the hinterland of Zadar, in 1318 is recorded knez Jakov de Hatugh. In the 1322 document by Mladen II Šubić of Bribir are recorded Stjepan and Stojislav, sons of Bogdan Gusić. The honourable knez of Nin between 1384–1394 was Budislav Gusić with an estate in Papratnik. In the second half of the 15th century are recorded many individuals in Posedarje and Zadar. The last known Gusić in the region of Zadar was Matija (1528) from Sali and Jeronim (1530) from the city of Zadar.

Their mention in the Krbava region is considered as a partial migration from the original place of origin. In the second half of the 13th century, the title of knez of Krbava was held by Matija and Bartol, sons of Slovinja's brother Grubiša. In 1250, Ladislav of Jakov received in estate village Gomiljane and Radoslavova Vas in Bužani županija by the King Béla IV of Hungary, however due to the desolation of Gomiljane Ladislav gifted the settlement in 1258 to Bogdan Lapčan because of loyal service. Additionally, for the good service, Ladislav was gifted by Béla IV with six estates in Krbava and two estates in other two Croatian županijas. Ladislav's sons Gvid, Desina and Pribislav had a dispute with cousin knez Kurjak who deprived them of their possessions but were returned by Paul I Šubić of Bribir. In the 14th century, the tribe came apart into several branches, of whom most powerful was magnate Kurjaković family (see below). At the time of Kurjaković's rule in Krbava seemingly other members from the tribe are not recorded in the sources, possibly indicating that Kurjaković's subjugated them or have gone elsewhere. In between the 14th and 16th century, they are mentioned in the hinterland of Zadar, Nin, Obrovac and Posedarje. Under the pressure of Kurjaković's, and later Ottoman Empire conquest, part of the tribe moved to Gacka županija in the 15th century, where built Gusić-grad ("Gusić fort").

In 1468, Ivan Gusić from the tribe of Mogorović was gifted with some estates in Paprčane and Tršćane for military service by Pavao Kurjaković. Some of them probably became members of Mogorović noble family. According to sources, at least since the 1480s they were vassals of the magnate Frankopan family. In the first half of 1500s, Kristofor Gusić married Katarina, sister of knez Petar Kružić. Both Kristofor and his father Ivan Gusić helped Kružić, with Ivan being vice-captain of Senj. In 1566, certain Andrija Gusić or Vladišić de Turan died at Siege of Szigetvár. Allegedly his son was Gašpar Gusić, who was the župan of Zagreb County, the lord of Turanj (de Turan) and podban ("vice Ban"), dividing the estates of brothers Gašpar and Gabrijel Šubić Peranski in 1556. When the Ottoman forces conquered Gusić-grad in 1575, part of lords migrated to Senj and Carniola. Reportedly some members until the 18th century were the captains of the military captaincy of Senj, commanders of Otočac, and commanders of infantry regiment of Ogulin. The baron branch was divided into two families in the 18th century, and to the tribe possibly belonged noble families Izačić, Oštriharić, and Krčelić.

=== Notable members ===
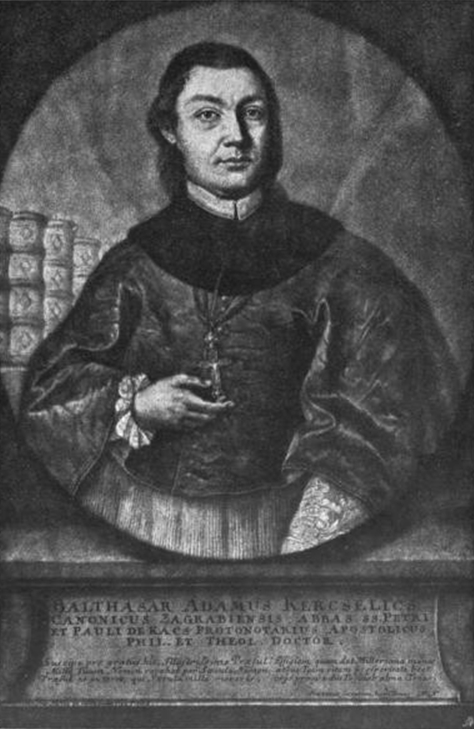
Baltazar Adam Krčelić (1715–1778), Croatian historian.

- Seifried Gusič (1709–1794), Slovenian baron, president of Academia Operosorum Labacensium, and humanist.
- Baltazar Adam Krčelić (1715–1778), Croatian historian, theologian, and lawyer.
- Ivan Rupert Gusić (18th century–1821), Croatian member of Benedictines and later secular priests of Archdiocese of Zagreb, was one of the Bible translators into Kajkavian literary language during the period of bishop Maksimilijan Vrhovac.
- Grgo Gusić (1821–1894), Hungarian-Croatian folk poet and professor.
- Branimir Gušić (1901–1975), Croatian otolaryngologist, anthropogeographer and ethnologist, a regular member of JAZU, founder of the Academy's Commission for Karst Studies, Chairman of the Committee for the Folk Life and Traditions (1955–75) and founder of the Ethnology Institute of JAZU.
- Marijana Gušić (1901–1987), Croatian ethnologist and mountaineer, Director of the Ethnographic Museum, Zagreb (1946–65) and Ethnographic Institute of JAZU (1963–75).
- Dora Gušić (1908–1998), Croatian piano and pianist pedagogues, recipient of Vladimir Nazor Life Achievement Award (1980).
- Juraj Gusić (1919–1994), Croatian religious writer and a publicist.
- Tomislav Gusić (1931–present), Croatian painter, graphically and artistically formatted editions of Dubrovnik Summer Festival and Vatroslav Lisinski Concert Hall (1967–1985).
- Ivan Gušić (1938–present), Croatian geologist and palaeontologist, a regular member of HAZU (1999) and professor emeritus (2009).
- Damir Gušić (1969-present) Network Architect in UK.

== Posedarski branch ==
In 1194, the nobles Albus Slavogost and Dragoslav of Krbava, received a grant by Béla III of Hungary with estates in Posedarje. In 1219, the grant was confirmed by King Andrew II of Hungary, and Slavogost is again mentioned in 1249 and 1251 grants by Ban Stjepan and King Béla IV of Hungary. From him originated the branch. Since the 14th century the family branch started calling themselves as Posdearski ("of Posedarje"), and have gained some estates in the city of Zadar. In 1396, Stjepan son of Petar Posedarski bought for 3,000 florins Kačina Gorica, Suhovare, Grgurice and Krnica from Mihovil Kačić.

The power of the family of Possidaria or de Posedarya, was based on a rich economy and military, which lasted until the end of the 18th century. They were influential to the formation and command of an elite Croatian cavalry unit called as Cro(v)ati a cavallo or Cavalleria Croata which was used since the 15th century by the Republic of Venice in resistance against the Ottoman army forces. Since the 15th century they actively fought as vassals of the Republic of Venice against the Ottomans, especially in the hinterland of Zadar. Venetians called them into military service with high military title of colonel who commanded over all the officers, serdars, and harambašas, even replaced Venetian Provveditore Generale.

In the 15th century, in 1495 count Juraj Posedarski of captain Petar helped Tomo Mogorović saving his brother Martin Mogorović from the Ottoman slavery by selling part of own estates, and was defending Obrovac when it fell to the Ottomans in 1527. In the 16th century, in 1541 Vid Posedarski was a commander of Croatian cavalrymen in Venetian forces, as well commander of Croati a cavallo of the fraternity of St. Jeronim. Later captains and commanders of the cavalry unit were Frane (1561, 1571; deceased 1588), Gašpar (1587–89; deceased 1613), Juraj (1594; deceased c. 1625), Petar (1594), Marko (1608), Šimun (1645; deceased 1652), Frane (1643; deceased c. 1666), Pavao (1709), Ivan Petar (1716), and Petar (1730-1760s; deceased 1771).

During the Cretan War (1645–1669) and Morean War (1684–1699) between the Republic of Venice and Ottoman Empire, the most prominent was count and colonel Frane of Gašpar Posedarski. He was appointed as the army commander of that area by Provveditore Generale in Dalmatia, Leonardo Foscolo, and fought alongside Morlach leaders like Petar Smiljanić, Vuk Mandušić, Stjepan Sorić and others. He participated in defence and conquest of Novigrad (1646–1647), liberation of Klis Fortress (1648), and died 1670. He was mentioned in several epic verses of Razgovor ugodni naroda slovinskog (1756) by Andrija Kačić Miošić, where is described as a "mighty knight". His brother Juraj was a captain and count, who as a warrior and commander of the Morlach army participated in the liberation of Učitelja Vas, Islam Latinski and Ravni Kotari. After his death in 1679, the commander became Stojan Janković, while his son Frane of Juraj became the governor of Nin as well the new colonel of Venetian forces. Frane died in 1717, with the last male descendant being his son count Petar Posedarski, the governor and colonel who led the seigniory from 1730 until his death in 1771.

The last direct descendant was the princess Domenika, daughter of Petar Posedarski, who married nobleman Josip Benja, with all the estates then owned by the noble family Benja-Posedarski from Zadar whose rights were confirmed by the government in Vienna in 1822. However, since the late 19th century due to agrarian reforms and especially 1940s, they have lost ownership over the estates. The branch perished with counts Antun (dec. 1952) and Darinka Benja Posedarski (née Pavličević, dec. 1975) who did not have any descendants.

=== Notable members ===
- Stjepan Posedarski (15th-16th century), a humanist, chaplain and envoy of Ivan Karlović, who in his work wrote about the difficulties Croats faced after the Battle of Krbava Field (1493) with the anti-Ottoman sentiment, specifically in his Oratio (1519) to Pope Leo X.
- Martin Posedarski (mid-16th century-1601), a count who since 1590 lived in Senj, participated in the Battle of Klis (1596) and dissatisfied with Venetian military policy against Ottomans permanently joined Uskoks from Senj as their military commander. In 1599 with 500 soldiers and 17 Uskok ships in the port of Rovinj captured 9 Venetian Galleys, because of which was executed by Austrian general Josip Rabatta in 1601.
- Frane Posedarski (died 1670), count and colonel who fought during the Cretan War (1645–1669).

== Kurjaković branch ==
The branch's founder Kurjak was mentioned for the first time in 1298 as comes Curiacus de genere Gussich, whose descendants in the 14th century started calling themselves as "Kurjaković" (de Coriach, de Curiaco, Curiacovich). Due to estates region they were also known as comes Corbavie. As mentioned before, Kurjak tried to deprive another Gusić's branch of their possessions. The genus branched by his sons Budislav, Pavle and Grgur, who during the 14th century were vassals of Paul and Mladen II Šubić of Bribir, and during Kurjak's lifetime they acquired Krbava županija as heirdom. They built and acquired several forts, and by mid-15th-century had control between Lika and Dalmatia, as well estates in Bosnia, Slavonia, Istria, Slovakia and Hungary. From the family branched among others Zakanjski, Čekliški, Mrsinjski named after the property, and Karlović after Karlo Kurjaković.

Between 1316 and 1322, during the time of several revolts between noble families of Šubić, Frankopan, Babonić, Nelipić, as well Stephen II, Ban of Bosnia and some Dalmatian coastal towns, they sided with Nelipić's against Šubić's from Bribir and others. Budislav managed to be Podestà of Šibenik (1320–21). In 1338, led by Grgur, they conventionally accepted the supreme authority of King Charles I of Hungary, but it was official only when Louis I of Hungary pressured them in 1345. At the end of the 14th century, Budislav's son Butko or Budislav, helped Sigismund to restore Mary, Queen of Hungary in 1387, and possibly was Ban of Croatia (1393–1394). Due to his support to Sigismund, later crowned pretender to the Hungarian-Croatian throne, Ladislaus of Naples took them away Ostrovica županija and fortress of Novigrad, but they maintained a very significant influence in the Hungarian-Croatian Kingdom.

Ivan of Nikola performed the duties of the Master of the Queen's and King's steward irregularly between 1388–1418, Karlo in 1408 became Master of the treasury, and they were among the founding members of Order of the Dragon. At the time, the Republic of Venice impeded regular traffic along the coast which negatively influenced their main seats at Obrovac and Karlobag. In the mid 15h century, Toma son of Pavle built fortress Ripač on the river Una in 1442, and his son Grgur fort Kličevac near Benkovac in 1453. However, their estates were on the way of Ottoman Empire conquest. In the 1490s, count Karlo opposed the coronation of Vladislaus II of Hungary, while in 1494 his widow Doroteja Frankopan paid yearly tribute to the Ottomans. Their son, Ivan Karlović who was the Ban of Croatia between 1521–1524 and 1527–1531, was the last male descendant of the family. He was present at the Election in Cetin (1527) when Croatian nobles elected Ferdinand I Habsburg as new King of Croatia. By inheritance contract from 1509 with Nikola III Zrinski, who married his sister Jelena, the vast estates went to the Zrinski family.

=== Notable members ===
- Grgur Kurjaković (14th century), Count of Krbava with brother Budislav, knight of the royal court with estates in Hungary.
- Budislav or Butko Kurjaković (14th century–1401), Count of Krbava, for help in saving Queen Mary named by her Court's Palatine in 1387, possibly Ban of Croatia in 1393 until 1394.
- Karlo Kurjaković, Ban of Croatia from 1409 until 1411, Hungarian Master of the treasury, among the founding members of Order of the Dragon.
- Ivan Karlović (1485–1531), Ban of Croatia between 1521 and 1524, and from 1527 until 1531.

== See also ==
- Croatian nobility
- Twelve noble tribes of Croatia
- List of noble families of Croatia
