= Cvijan Šarić =

Dalmatian Serb harambaša

Cvijan Šarić (Serbian Cyrillic: Цвијан Шарић; fl. 1652–1668) was a Dalmatian Serb harambaša (senior hajduk commander) in the service of the Republic of Venice, part of the Morlach army that fought in the Cretan War (1645–69) alongside other notable fighters such as Janko Mitrović and Ilija Smiljanić. He was a Serbian Orthodox priest.

== Biography ==
Šarić was an ethnic Serb, part of the Morlach community in Dalmatia. It is said that he was from the Šibenik frontier. He was a Serbian Orthodox priest. He held the rank of serdar. He is known by the title harambaša (bandit leader).

Around 1666, Šarić had a crucial influence on the Morlachs. In 1668, Šarić asked the Venetian provveditore of Venetian Dalmatia and Albania, on behalf of all the Orthodox Morlachs, to stop the local Catholics from harassing their bishop Kiril and throwing garbage near the Orthodox church. On 3 October 1668, the Venetian governor issued a statement and threatened a Mihovil Kapuan with a fine of 500 ducats for his involvement in the harassment of bishop Kiril. At this time there was great pressure on the Orthodox population of Venetian- and Habsburg-controlled territories to convert or become Uniate with the Catholic Church. Another request was turned in to the Dalmatian governor dated 1 November 1669, signed by a number of chiefs in Venetian service, including Šarić.

He is mentioned in Serbian epic poetry. There were several other Morlach chiefs surnamed Šarić, such as Milin Šarić, etc.

== See also ==
- Vuk Mandušić (fl. 1648), military commander in Austrian service
- Bajo Pivljanin
- Vuk Močivuna
- Vid Žeravica
- Todor Kladić
- Morlachs
- Morlachs (Venetian irregulars)
- Stojan Janković (1636–1687), Morlach leader
- Stanislav Sočivica, Venetian rebel
- Sinobad
- Petronije Selaković
- Grujica Žeravica
- Vukosav Puhalović
- Ilija Smiljanić
- Petar Smiljanić
- Juraj Vranić
- Tadije Vranić

== Annotations ==
Name: He was also known as Cvitko (Цвитко Шарић), and his surname has also been scarcely rendered Šarinić (Шаринић) and Šorić (Шорић)

== Sources ==
- Marko Jačov (1990). Srbi u mletačko-turskim ratovima u XVII veku. Sveti arhijerejski sinod Srpske pravoslavne crkve. pp. 58, 114–117.
