= Stojan Janković =

Commander of irregular troops in the Venetian army

Stojan Janković Mitrović
- Стојан Јанковић Митровић
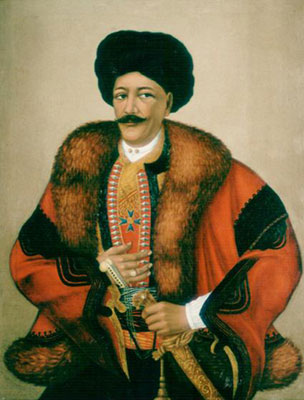
- Portrait, oil painting
- Born: 1636; Near Bukovica, Republic of Venice
- Died: 23 August 1687 (aged 50–51); Županjac, Bosnia Eyalet, Ottoman Empire
- Military career
- Allegiance: Republic of Venice
- Service years: 1669–1687
- Rank: capo principale; harambaša (bandit leader); serdar
- Unit: Morlach troops
- Conflicts: Cretan War (1645–1669); Morean War (1684–1699)

Stojan Janković Mitrović (Serbian Cyrillic: Стојан Јанковић Митровић; also known as Stoian Jancovich Mitrovich, Stoian Mitrovich, Stoiano Mitrovich; about 1636 – 23 August 1687) was the commander of the Morlach troops in the service of the Republic of Venice, from 1669 until his death in 1687. He participated in the Cretan and Great Turkish War, as the supreme commander of the Venetian Morlach troops, of which he is enumerated in Croatian and Serbian epic poetry. He was one of the best-known uskok/hajduk leaders of Dalmatia.

== Life ==
=== Origin ===
Stojan was born in ca. 1636, somewhere in the mountainous Bukovica region in northern Dalmatia, modern-day Croatia, presumably in the village of Žegar, or Zelengrad. The village itself lied above the Žegar field, from where the population had long "jumped into" (i.e. guerilla warfare) the Dinara, the Venetian-Ottoman border for centuries. His father was harambaša Janko Mitrović (1613–1659), another renowned anti-Ottoman rebel in Venetian service, noted commander of the Morlach army in the Cretan War (1645–1669). Stojan had two brothers (Ilija and Zaviša Janković) and a sister Ana. The family of Stojan Janković belonged to Serb Orthodox community and their family slava was Đurđevdan.

=== Cretan War and peacetime ===
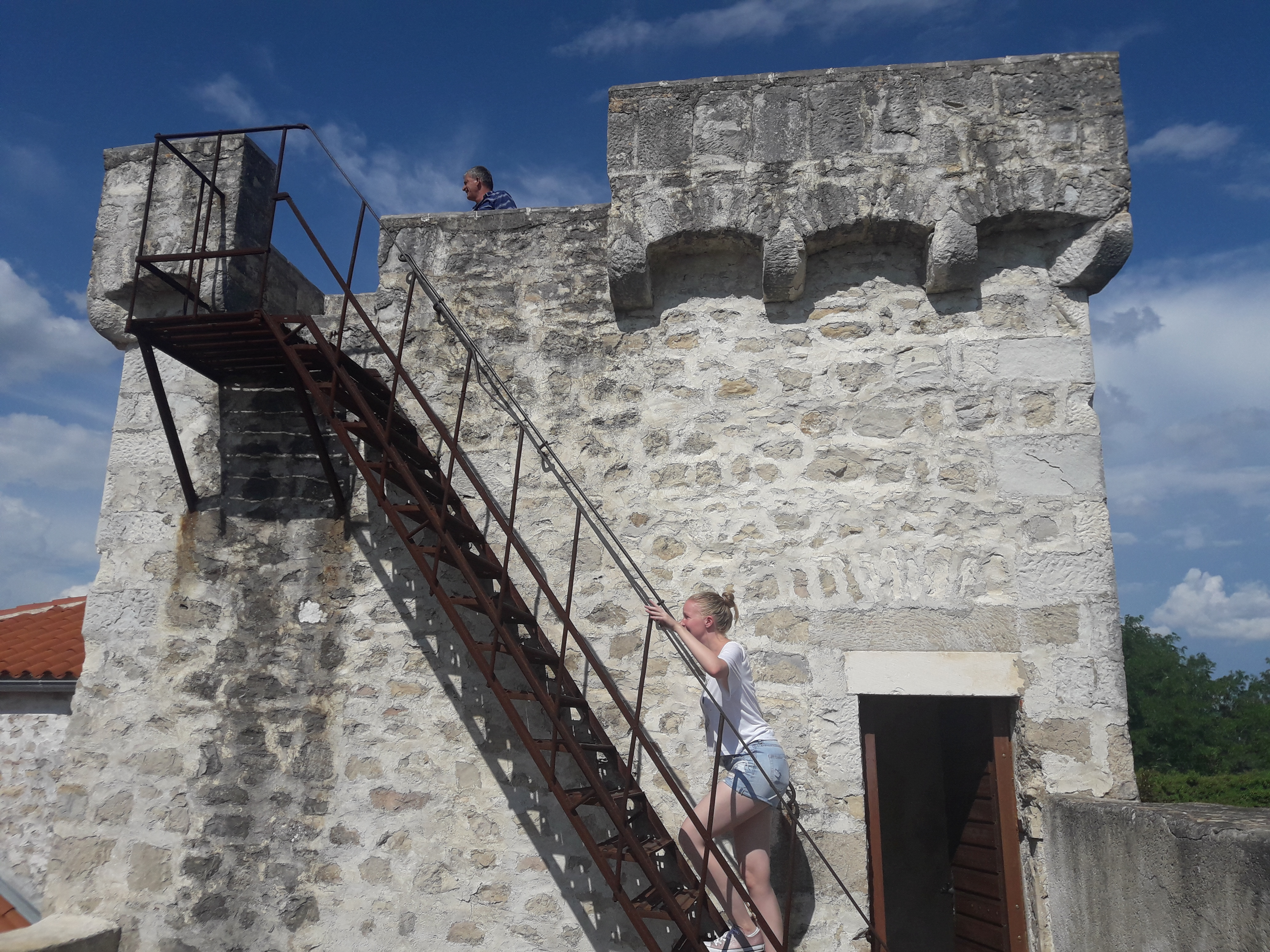
The Kula Jankovića (Janković Tower), a fort in which Stojan Janković and his descendants lived. It is now owned by the Desnica family.

Stojan began fighting alongside his father and Ilija Smiljanić early on as a fifteen year old, in the Cretan War. Ilija, as the most experienced, was named serdar in 1648 after his own father, Petar Smiljanić had died. In 1650, Stojan begins to receive a payment of 4 ducats, in 1653 the pay is raised to 6. In February 1659, at the Cetina river, both leaders Janko and Ilija Smiljanić succumb to wounds after battling the Turks. The same year, the well experienced 23-year-old Stojan is chosen as leader by the band. As a leader, he constantly takes part in battles in the Frontier. He was known to have defeated several Turkish contingents, and even himself slew the commanders, among which are notable: Ali-beg Durakbegović, Redžep-aga Filipović, aga Velagić, aga Pajalitović and Ibrahim-aga Kovačević. In 1666, during fighting near Obrovac, at the Cetina River, where agas Atlagić, Čengić and Baraković fell, he was captured by the Ottomans and spent 14 months in Constantinople as a slave, before escaping and returning home. For his deeds, he was awarded a title and an estate in Ravni Kotari.

In the peacetime between the Cretan and Great Turkish War, he was ordered to suppress anti-Ottoman operations in Venetian territory, while in the meantime his brother Ilija left Venetian service and began fighting the Ottomans - this resulted in the brief interrogation of Stojan at Venice.

In 1669-1670, Venice awards him 29 ducats monthly, and among other gifts he received a golden ring of St. Mark (becoming a knight of the Order of Saint Mark), and his two sons became captains. He was also given a part of Islam Grčki (where was built Kula Jankovića), but lost it in 1671 with new border negotiations of Mahmud Pasha and Giann Battista. A truce ensured 1670-1684. In 1671 was named as the commander of Ostrovica Fortress. After the death of count Juraj Posedarski, in 1681 became the capo principale di Morlacchi, transl. "commander-in-chief of the Morlachs", with a monthly pay of 25 ducats. In 1683, his brother Ilija, whom the Venetians failed to implement into their military and since 1680 was banished from Venetian territories because did not respect the Venetian-Ottoman temporary peace on the boundary, instigated a revolt in Dalmatia against the Ottomans, in collaboration with uskoks of Senj revolted with the Venetian and Ottoman Morlachs with the center in Ostrovica. Because of that, Stojan and Zaviša were captured in September of the same year by the Venetians, but Stojan was freed in November. Then the governor-general Lovre Donà helped Stojan, Smoljan Smiljanić, Sorić from Zemunik, and Ivan Drašković to stop the revolt.

=== Morean War (Great Turkish War) ===
In 1684, he returned to the battlefield, liberating Sinj, Lika and Krbava by 1686. In 1685, helped to free Gračac and Sinj, participated in operations around Zadvarje, Vrgorac, Čitluk and Ljubuški. In the summer, Stojan with count Franjo Posedarski had brought 300 families with him from Lika to Dalmatia, In July 1686, with Smoljan Smiljanić, commanded 5,000 infantrymen and 1500 horsemen when successfully attacked Livno and Glamoč. In the same year, he was allowed to form an overseas military unit in Levant under command of his son Colonel Nikola, as well forming a cavalry unit of Croats (compagnia de Crouati a cavallo) under command of the other son Konstantin. He is credited for the return of the Franciscan order to Sinj, because of which several times charged to Prozor-Rama where were under pressure by Orthodox priests and Ottoman government. During the siege of Herceg Novi, he went with one part of the troops and pillaged the outskirt of Ottoman Tomislavgrad (Duvno), Livno and Glamoč, where he was killed on 23 August 1687. Venetians wrote of him having "bigger heart than mind", and his name was famous among Turks and Christians, especially among those of "old faith", ie. Orthodox.

== Family ==
He was married twice, first to Vika with whom he had three children, sons Alojz (Alviža, given from the name of godfather Alvisa Contarini, son of governor-general Petar Contarini), Nikola (died 1687 in Levant, or 1688) and daughter Stošija (Anastazija). He murdered Vika because of alleged jealousy for possible love scam. In 1676 he married second wife Antonia Rezzi (or Reci) of Greek Catholic faith from Zadar, and had sons Josip, Konstantin (d. 1692), Slobodan (d. 1866), Janko (d. 1685), Marko (d. 1686), and daughters Marija (d. 1686) and Magdalena (d. 1684). Six of his children, as well his sister Ana, were recorded in the register of the dead of the Catholic župa of Zadar Cathedral, implying the family was of Catholic faith.

Stojan was awarded a fortification (castle) which had been in the possession of a Turkish landlord named Jusuf Aga Tunić in Islam Grcki, after one of his military victories. This became the Janković family home and in 1675 he commissioned the building of a Serbian Orthodox Church here in the name of Saint George (Đurđevdan was slava of family of Stojan Janković). The estate was named "Kula Janković" and Stojan made a legal undertaking that it could not be alienated either by marriage, testament or other reason to keep it in the Janković family.

His sons Nikola and Konstantin died in their military service, and as his descendants did not have any children his branch soon died out. His brother's Ilija (died poisoned in 1692, or 1694) branch also didn't have grandchildren. His sister Ana married to Dmitar Nikolić from Bay of Kotor and had daughter Ana. Brother Zaviša had sons Stojan, Ilija and daughter Jelena. All members of the family received the titles of count by the Doge of Venice Sebastiano Mocenigo in 1705 as the heritage of merit of the father Janko and the godfather Stojan. However, Stojan and serdar Ilija died without direct male descendants and the whole estate was inherited by Jelena who married Venetian colonel Teodor Dede, Orthodox Greek from Heraklion. As according to the original 1670 investiture the estate could not have been alienated by marriage, testament, or other, Teodor took the surname Mitrović, the transfer of the surname, nobility and estate was confirmed by Doge Alvise Pisani in 1739, hence creating a branch of Venetian counts Dede Mitrović. The last count was Ilija Dede Mitrović (great-great-grandson, b. in Zadar 1818, d. in Trieste 1874), whose daughter Olga married Vladimir Desnica, father of Serb writer Boško (1886-1945), and grandfather of Vladan Desnica (son of Uroš Desnica). Boško in his archival research had open inclinations toward Serbdom resulting in uncritical translation of Venetian documents (Morlachs became Serbs, family Mitrović became Janković, ignored the mention of Croatian language and name), influencing Serbian historiographical viewpoint which considers Morlachs and Uskoks almost exclusively as Serbian and Serbs.

== In folk tradition ==
- He is enumerated in Serbian epic poetry (Ropstvo Janković Stojana, Janković Stojan i Smiljanić Ilija, Janko kapetan i turski sužnji, Ženidba Janković Stojana etc.), as well work Razgovor ugodni naroda slovinskog (1756) by Andrija Kačić Miošić. The poem Ženidba Janković Stojana (translated by Élise Voïart) was used by Alphonse de Lamartine for the writing of La chute d'un ange (1838).
- He is also enumerated in Muslim (Bosniak) folk poems.

== See also ==
- Kula Jankovića, family estate, fortification in Ravni Kotar
- Vuk Mandušić (fl. 1648), military commander in Venetian service
- Ilija Perajica, Morlach leader
- Stanislav Sočivica, Venetian rebel
- Sinobad
- Cvijan Šarić
- Petronije Selaković
- Bajo Pivljanin
- Grujica Žeravica
- Vukosav Puhalović
- Ilija Smiljanić
- Petar Smiljanić
- Vuk Močivuna
- Juraj Vranić
- Tadije Vranić

== Notes ==
1. Name: His given name was Stojan, his father was Janko Mitrović, hence Stojan Janković. His grandfather was Mitar, hence Stojan Mitrović. According to the contemporary naming culture, his name was Stojan Mitrović Janković. In Serb epic poetry, his name is written as Janković Stojan. He is also mentioned in contemporary Venetian sources as Knight Janko (chevalier, sr. kavalir Janko).

Military offices
Preceded by Janko Mitrović	Commander-in-chief of the Morlach army under Republic of Venice; 1669-1687	Succeeded by
