= Stanislav Sočivica =

Serbian hajduk (brigand)

Stanko Sočivica
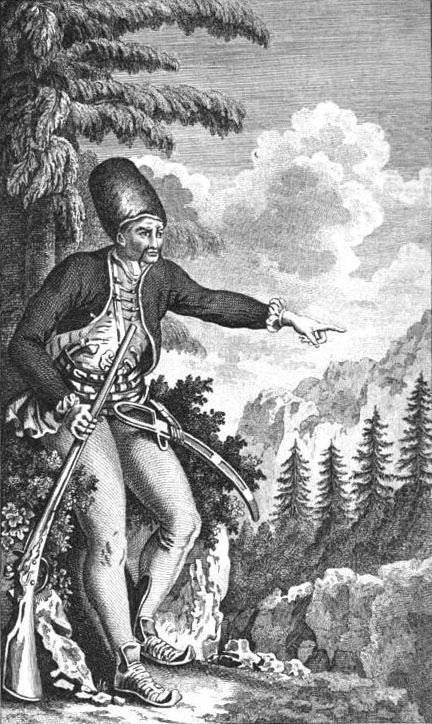
- Engraving of Sočivica (1779)
- Born: c. 1715; Simijova, Sanjak of Herzegovina (now Bosnia and Herzegovina)
- Died: after 1777; Habsburg monarchy
- Military career
- Allegiance: Hajduks (1745–75); Habsburg Monarchy (fl. 1775–77)
- Rank: harambaša
- Unit: Pandurs (fl. 1775–77)

Stanislav "Stanko" Sočivica (c. 1715 – fl. 1777) was a Serbian hajduk (brigand) active in the Ottoman territories in western Balkans (sanjaks of Herzegovina, Bosnia and Montenegro). Born in a village close to Bileća, his family owned a farm subject to a harsh Ottoman bey family. After murdering the beys and taking their collected taxes, the family subsequently relocated to Venetian Dalmatia from where Sočivica and his brothers began their brigandage. After decades of brigandage, and the capture of his wife and children, he retired to the Habsburg monarchy, where he was appointed commander of the Pandurs by Emperor Joseph II himself, in 1775.

== Life ==
=== Origin and early life ===
Sočivica was born in c. 1715 in the village of Simijova northwest of Bileća in the Sanjak of Herzegovina (Ottoman Empire). Ivan Lovrić (fl. 1756–77) wrote the biography of Sočivica, while his life story was mentioned by Alberto Fortis (1741–1803), based on Sočivica's own narrative. He was of normal stature, had a long face, and blue eyes. His father, Vuk, was a farmer, whose land was owned by an infamous family of rich Turks, the Umetalčić, who were very harsh towards the family: they not only constantly insulted them, but also beat them severely. Stanko, a turbulent and ferocious person, plotted with his three brothers against their masters, but their father who was mild and pacific advised them not to act, for several years. Two of his brothers were named Ilija and Nikola.

The three Umetalčić brothers, having headed from Poplat (Berkovići) to nearby Vranjska to collect haraç (tax), had by chance decided to lodge at the Sočivica farm, carrying with them a purse of 18,000 sequins that they had collected on the way. Stanko convinced his two brothers that this was a chance for vengeance, and enrichment, and persuaded them to murder the three guests. They then had them buried in a deep ditch by the farm.

After the murders, the family did not flee; in retaliation, the Pasha of Trebinje and the captain of the guards arrested up to 50 Christians, some of whom were executed, the other made slaves, but no suspicion fell on the brothers. In about a year, however, there were some doubts; Stanko's rashness, and the sum of money they suddenly had, forced them to leave their home and decamp. Their father died on the way.

=== Imotski ===
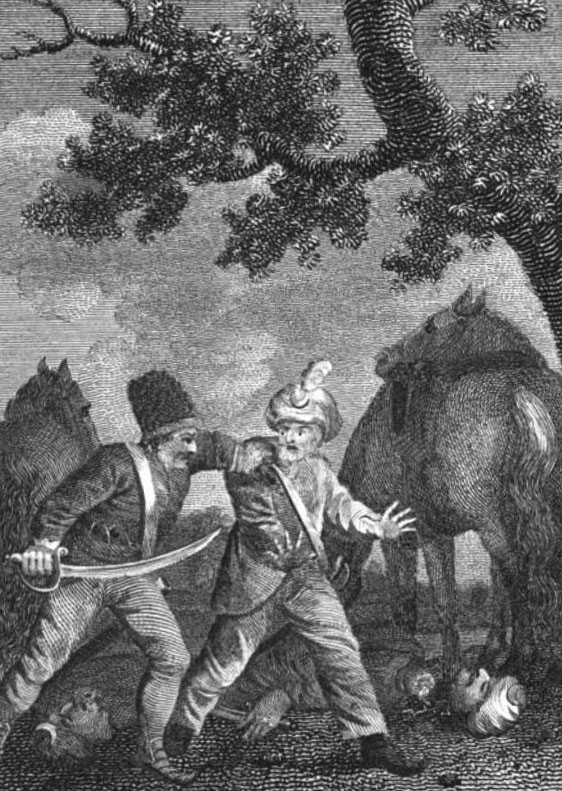
Sočivica killing a Turk.

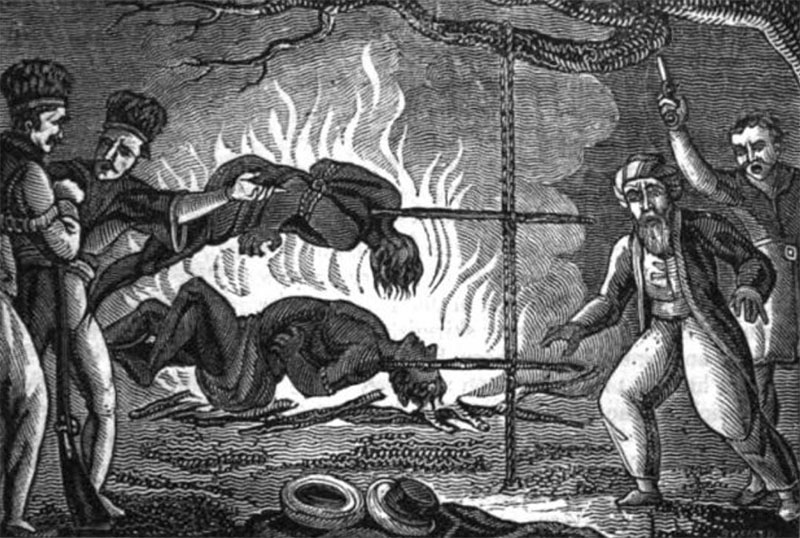
Sočivica's men roasting Turk prisoners.

The family arrived in Imotski, which at the time was under the sovereignty of the Republic of Venice (Venetian Dalmatia), and built a house and opened up a shop with excellent and expensive merchandise, with the Ottoman money, in 1745. The merchant life did not suit Stanko's activeness, thus, he and an entourage of 10 men turned to Montenegro, where they by the course of the summer massacred 40 Turks. It is thought that he never committed an offence against subjects of Venice or Austria, but entirely directed his fury against the Turkish people.

After several expeditions, joined by one of his brothers, he returned to Imotski where he resided for 9 years, working in the trade established by his family. He made excursions from time to time, and assassinated Turks. One of his brothers was in the band together with distinguished hajduk Lazar Pecirep. Stanislav Sočivica and Lazar Pecirep were the most distinguished hajduks of their time.

=== Murder of his brother ===
Sočivica's brother, who had accompanied him on his expeditions, joined the most furious hajduks (brigands) in the country, and became a blood brother (pobratime) with an Orthodox Morlach, who, in spite of the brotherhood, got him drunk and delivered him to the Pasha of Travnik where he was tortured to death. After hearing of his brother's death, Sočivica immediately went to the house of the blood brother, where he was received by his father. The father told a story in a manner posing his son as entirely innocent, and when the blood brother appeared he displayed great kindness, then went out under the pretence of seeking the finest lamb in his flock to treat Sočivica; his real intention was to deliver him to the Turks stationed in Duvno, 19 km from the house. As the blood brother had not yet returned, the house retired to rest, all except Stanko. He was tormented with bad feelings, and rose from his bed in search for a light, but could find none throughout the house. Suspicion and rage arose, and he sought his arms, but could not find them, and he called loudly, but to no answers. He went to the bedside of the father, demanding his arms. The father, who expected his son returning with Turks, sought to gain time by equivocating, Sočivica then rashly crushed his head with a small axe, then went to an old female servant, who complied with him. As soon as he regained his arms, he left the house and lurked at a distance, to watch the event and ascertain the blood brother's treachery, of which he soon gained proof of. Sočivica then assembled a few friends, surrounded and set the house on fire. 17 people died in the flames, and a woman who attempted to escape was shot together with her infant in her arms. From this time on, the Ottomans pursued Stanko with maximum rancour, and Sočivica in the meantime multiplied his murders and robberies.

In August 1754, the same year when he had burnt the house, he narrowly escaped the pursuit of a party of Croats, who were out in search of him, and concluding that he was no longer safe in Venetian territory, he sent for his family to join him in Karlowitz (Sremski Karlovci), to which he travelled to by foot.

=== Karlovci ===
As he was pursued on every side, he retired with his family to Sremski Karlovci, in the Military Frontier of Habsburg Austria (modern Serbia). He lived an innocent life there for 3 years, together with his two brothers, wife, son and daughter.

An undisclosed person betrayed him into the hands of the same Pasha that killed his brother, and his wife and children were later captured in the same manner. The three Sočivica brothers were imprisoned at a fort beyond Udbina, at the Ottoman–Venetian–Austrian frontier, and then escorted by 100 cavalrymen before the Pasha of Travnik, to be relocated to the prison in Travnik. They were given two choices, conversion into Islam, or impalement, accepting the former. His two brothers were released, and one of them was bestowed the title of aga, while Stanislav, known for his public antagonism towards the Ottomans, remained imprisoned. His two brothers took the first opportunity to flee the Ottomans, upon which the enraged Pasha annulled the conversion of Stanislav, who had been given the name Ibrahim, and ordered for a more strained imprisonment with constant overwatch. His new strategy was to tell the guards of buried treasures, and that he would show the Pasha the locations in return of privileges that he had before his brothers' escape. For a month, Sočivica took the guards to different locations where he had either kept a sum of money, or places where he claimed he had mistaken. On 26 November 1758 Sočivica and his family, which had been lured to meet up with Sočivica as a free man, were brought before the Effendi. He later managed to escape during the journey. As his family members were still prisoners, he negotiated for their release with the Pasha, but in vain. As all methods failed, he resorted to write to the Pasha:

I am informed, O pasha of Bosnia, that you complain of my escape; but I put it to yourself, what would you have done in my place? Would you have suffered yourself to be bound with cord like a miserable beast, and led without resistance by men, who, as soon as they arrived at a certain place, would in all probability, have put you to death? Nature impels us to avoid destruction, and I have only acted in obedience to her laws.

Tell me, pacha, what crime have my wife and children committed, that, in spite of law and justice, you should retain them like slaves? Perhaps you hope to render me more submissive; but you cannot surely expect that I shall return to you, and hold forth my arms to be loaded with fresh chains. No; you do but deceive yourself, and render me more terrible than before. Hear me then, pacha: you may exhaust on them all your fury, without producing the least advantage. On my part I declare, I will wreak my vengeance on all the Turks, your subjects, who may fall into my hands; and I will omit no means of injuring you. – For the love of God, restore to me, I beseech you, my blood. Obtain my pardon from my sovereign, and no longer retain in your memory my past offences. I promise that I will then leave your subjects in tranquillity, and even serve them as a guide when necessary.

If you refuse me this favour, expect from me all that despair can prompt. I will assemble my friends, carry destruction wherever you reside, pillage your property, plunder your merchants; and from this moment, if you pay no attention to my entreaties, I swear that I will massacre every Turk that falls into my hands.

The Pasha did not give much attention to the letter, and Stanko exerted himself in accomplishing the vow he made. He devastated the country, showing proof of his heroism; so much that the people were forced to request the pasha for help from the devastation, by sending back his wife and children. The Pasha, however, was unrelentless, and Stanko could only free his family with force and strategy.

=== Late years ===
Sočivica's men captured a Turk who had earlier helped one of his brothers to escape, and the brother, in opposition to the chief and the rest of the band, was anxious to return the favour. Although the Turk was destined to die, the grateful brother, while Stanko was at prayers, set him free. The other hajduks were outraged, and one of his nephews even punched him; the brother then drew a gun and killed him on the spot. Sočivica expelled his brother, and after the funeral of his nephew, felt such a humiliation that he decided to retire.

However, his habits were not so easily changed. After a short retirement he suddenly resumed the banditry, plundering on the highway. After his many massacres and robberies, he only had a possession of 600 sequins, which he confided to a friend and a cousin, however, both ran off with the money.

Later, in 1775, Emperor Joseph II, while passing by Grazach, where Sočivica resided, wished to see him. Joseph II brought him and interrogated him, and made him repeat the main events of his life, then gave him a considerable sum of money and appointed him the harambaša of the Pandurs. He lived at Grazach in 1777, at the time when his biography was first written. In 1800, it was not known whether he was dead.

== Family ==
Stanko managed to have his wife and son released from captivity in Ottoman Travnik, and had them brought to the Serbian Orthodox Dragović monastery, in Venetian territory, where a monk taught his son how to read and write.

== Legacy ==
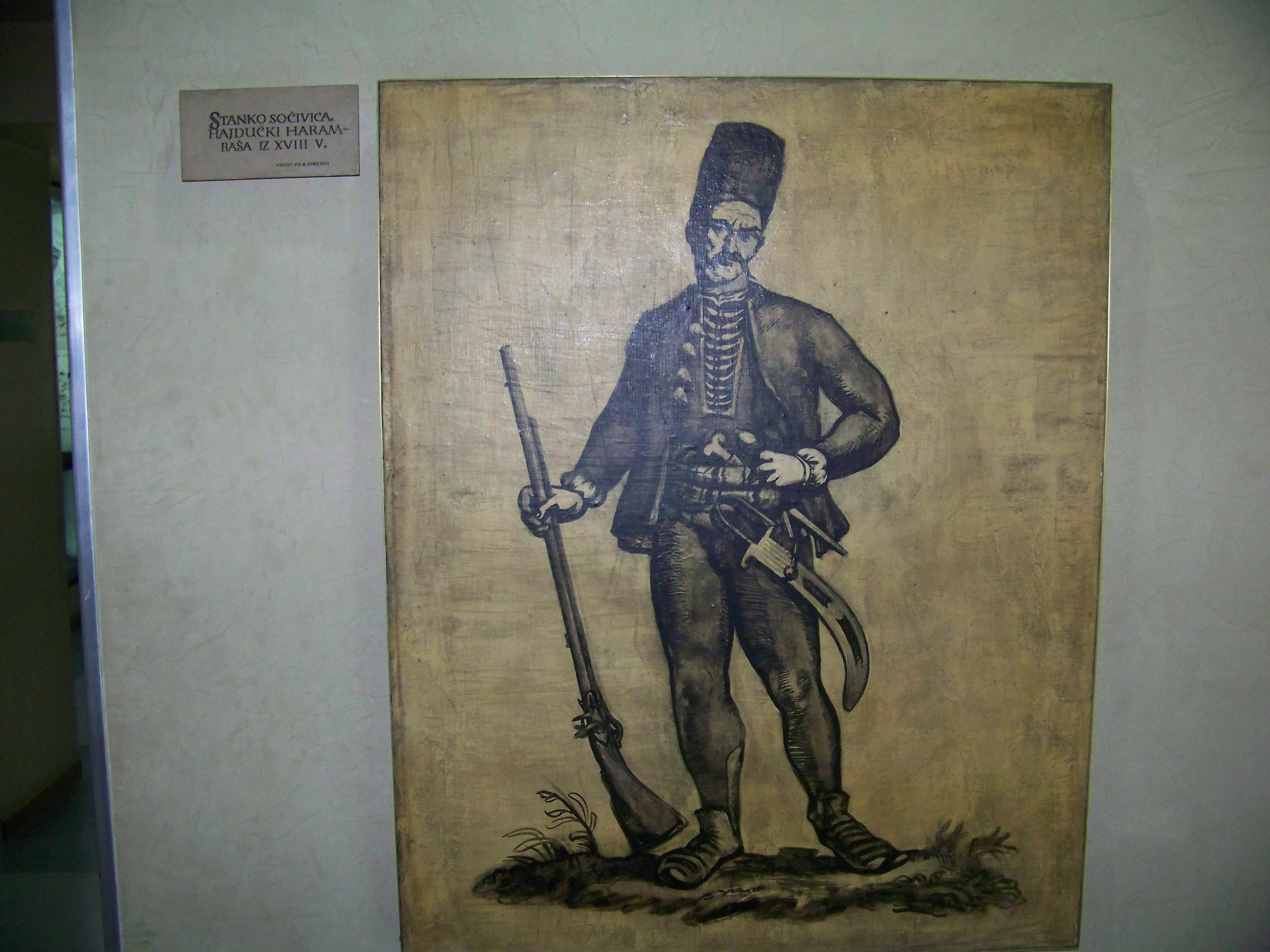
Painting of Sočivica at the Military Museum (Belgrade).

His life was the subject of a book by Dalmatian writer Ivan Lovrić (1776). He was known in Morlach folk poetry. He was also mentioned in The Mountain Wreath by Petar II Petrović-Njegoš.

== See also ==
- Lazar Pecirep, a member of one of Stanko's brothers' bands, and acclaimed hero of Herzegovina and Montenegro.
- Morlachs
- Morlachs (Venetian irregulars)
- Vuk Mandušić (fl. 1648), military commander in Venetian service
- Stojan Janković (1636–1687), Morlach leader
- Sinobad
- Cvijan Šarić
- Petronije Selaković
- Bajo Pivljanin
- Grujica Žeravica
- Vukosav Puhalović
- Ilija Smiljanić
- Petar Smiljanić
- Vuk Močivuna
- Juraj Vranić
- Tadije Vranić

Military offices
Preceded by ?	Commander of the Pandurs (Habsburg irregular militia) fl. 1775–77	Succeeded by ?

== Annotations ==
1. His name was Stanislav Sočivica (Serbian Cyrillic: Станислав Сочивица, Italian: Stanislao Socivizca), known in historiography also with the diminutive Stanko (Станко Сочивица). His father was Vuk, hence, according to naming culture, his surname was Vuković. In some cases, his name has been given as Stanislav Petrović or Stanislav Radović. His surname, sočivica, means "lentils".

== Sources ==
Primary

- Lovrić, Ivan (1776). Osservazioni di Giovanni Lovrich sopra diversi pezze del Viaggio in Dalmazia del signor abate Alberto Fortis: coll'aggiunta della Vita di Soçivizça.
- Fortis, Alberto (1778) [1774]. Viaggio in Dalmazia [Journey to Dalmatia]. London.
- Marc Chapuis (1777). Histoire De Socivizca Fameux Brigand De La Nation Des Morlaques Appélés Monténégrins; Qui s'est rendu formidablé de nos jours aux Turcs des frontiéres du comté de Zara. Aujourd'hui Arambassa des Pandoures en Autriche. Société Typographique.

Secondary

- Watson, J. (1804). "Adventure of Socivizca". The gleaner; or, Entertainment for the fire-side. pp. 14–25.
- Bronson, E.; et al. (1809). Select Reviews. Hopkins and Earle. pp. 351–353.
- Samardžić, Radovan (1986). Istorija srpskog naroda: pt. 1. Srbi u XVIII veku. Srpska knjiiževna zadruga.
- Savez udruženja folklorista Jugoslavije (1970). Narodno stvaralaštvo: Folklor. Naučno delo. pp. 166–.
- Миодраг Стојановић (1984). Хајдуци и клефти у народном песништву. Српска академија наука и уметности, Балканолошки институт. pp. 67, 119, 143. "Сочивица"
- Mihić, Ljubo (1975). Ljubinje sa okolinom. Dragan Srnic.
