= Vukosav Puhalović =

Vukosav Puhalović (Serbian Cyrillic: Вукосав Пухаловић; fl. 1665–69) was a Serb hajduk commander active in the Ottoman territories of Herzegovina and southern Dalmatia during the Venetian–Ottoman war (1645–69). The hajduks, Ottoman subjects, crossed into Venetian territory from where they "jumped into" Ottoman territory. These guerilla forces closely cooperated and were recruited by the Republic of Venice to defend the Venetian–Ottoman frontier during the war. He was a comrade of acclaimed Bajo Pivljanin.

Puhalović was among the most notable hajduk leaders during the Cretan War. In early April 1669 Pivljanin and Puhalović took great loot in Herzegovina. The next month Puhalović raided Ottoman territory crossing Konavle, and returned with five heads and eleven captured Ottoman noblemen from Novi. In December 1669 Antonio Priuli brought from Perast to Venice hajduk leaders including Pivljanin, Grujica Žeravica, Puhalović and buljubaša Milošević. Earlier, in June, the Venetian provedditore issued the termination of the "chiefs that protect the Kotor area", the first three mentioned, and had them included in the list of soldiers having the right of pay and bread. He had the rank of harambaša ("bandit leader").

Vukosav Puhalović is known from Serbian epic poetry.

== See also ==
- Morlachs
- Morlachs (Venetian irregulars)
- Vuk Mandušić (fl. 1648), military commander in Venetian service
- Stojan Janković (1636–1687), Morlach leader
- Janko Mitrović
- Stanislav Sočivica, Venetian rebel
- Sinobad
- Cvijan Šarić
- Petronije Selaković
- Bajo Pivljanin
- Grujica Žeravica
- Ilija Smiljanić
- Petar Smiljanić
- Vuk Močivuna
- Juraj Vranić
- Tadije Vranić
- Petar Jagodić
- Matija Žabetić
- Ilija Nanić

== Sources ==
- Filološki fakultet (1956). Prilozi za književnost, jezik, istoriju i folklor. Vol. 22–23. Državna štamparija Kraljevine Srba, Hrvata i Slovenaca.
- Samardžić, Radovan; Veselinović, Rajko L.; Popović, Toma (1993). Radovan Samardžić (ed.). Istorija srpskog naroda. Treća knjiga, prvi tom: Srbi pod tuđinskom vlašću 1537-1699. Belgrade: Srpska književna zadruga.
- Dabić, Bojan (2011). "Историја српског народа у периоду од XVI до XVIII века". Филозофски факултет Универзитета у Београду.
