= Grujica Žeravica =

Grujica Žeravica (Serbian Cyrillic: Грујица Жеравица; fl. 1665–69) was a Serb hajduk commander active in the Ottoman territories of Herzegovina and southern Dalmatia during the Venetian–Ottoman war (1645–69). The hajduks, Ottoman subjects, crossed into Venetian territory from where they "jumped into" Ottoman territory. These guerilla forces closely cooperated and were recruited by the Republic of Venice to defend the Venetian–Ottoman frontier during the war. He was a comrade of acclaimed Bajo Pivljanin.

Žeravica hailed from Banjani, in the Sanjak of Herzegovina (now in western Montenegro). A 1665 appeal of hajduk leaders to Venice was signed by Bajo Pivljanin and Grujica Žeravica. In December 1669 Antonio Priuli brought from Perast to Venice hajduk leaders including Pivljanin, Žeravica, Vukosav Puhalović and buljubaša Milošević. Earlier, in June, the Venetian provveditore issued the termination of the "chiefs that protect the Kotor area", the first three mentioned, and had them included in the list of soldiers having the right of pay and bread. He had the rank of harambaša ("bandit leader").

Grujica Žeravica is known from Serbian epic poetry.

== See also ==
- Morlachs
- Morlachs (Venetian irregulars)
- Vuk Mandušić (fl. 1648), military commander in Venetian service
- Stojan Janković (1636–1687), Morlach leader
- Stanislav Sočivica, Venetian rebel
- Sinobad
- Cvijan Šarić
- Petronije Selaković
- Bajo Pivljanin
- Vukosav Puhalović
- Smiljanić family

== Sources ==
- Filološki fakultet (1956). Prilozi za književnost, jezik, istoriju i folklor. Vol. 22–23. Državna štamparija Kraljevine Srba, Hrvata i Slovenaca.
- Samardžić, Radovan; Veselinović, Rajko L.; Popović, Toma (1993). Radovan Samardžić (ed.). Istorija srpskog naroda. Treća knjiga, prvi tom: Srbi pod tuđinskom vlašću 1537-1699. Belgrade: Srpska književna zadruga.
- Dabić, Bojan (2011). "Историја српског народа у периоду од XVI до XVIII века". Филозофски факултет Универзитета у Београду.
