= Morlachs =

Term for a Christian community

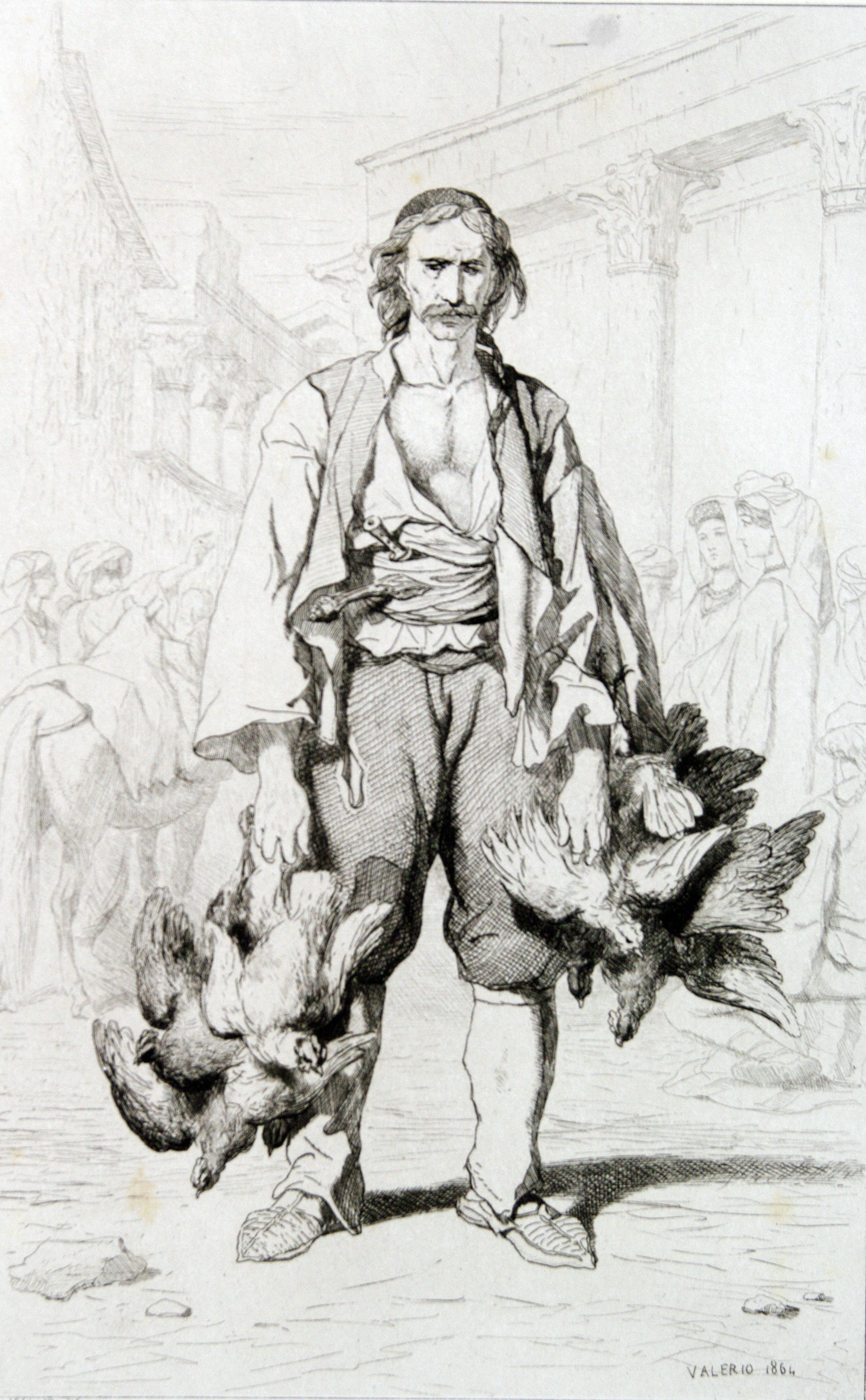
Morlach peasant from the Split region (of modern Croatia). Théodore Valerio (1819–1879), 1864.

Morlachs (Serbo-Croatian: Morlaci, Морлаци; Italian: Morlacchi; Romanian: Morlaci) is an exonym used for a rural Christian community in Herzegovina, Lika and the Dalmatian Hinterland. The term was initially used for a bilingual Vlach pastoralist community in the mountains of Croatia from the second half of the 14th until the early 16th century. Then, when the community straddled the Venetian–Ottoman border until the 17th century, it referred only to the Slavic-speaking people of the Dalmatian Hinterland, Orthodox and Catholic, on both the Venetian and Turkish side.

The exonym ceased to be used in an ethnic sense by the end of the 18th century, and came to be viewed as derogatory, but has been renewed as a social or cultural anthropological subject. As the nation-building of the 19th century proceeded, the Vlach/Morlach population residing with the Croats and Serbs of the Dalmatian Hinterland espoused either a Croat or Serb ethnic identity, but preserved some common sociocultural outlines.

== Etymology ==
The word Morlach is derived from the Italian Morlacco (pl. Morlacchi), used by the Venetians to refer to the Vlachs from Dalmatia since the 15th century. The name Morovlah appears in Dubrovnik records in the mid-14th century, while in the 15th century, the abbreviated form Morlah, Morlak or Murlak is found in both Dubrovnik and Venice archives. Two main theories have been put forward to explain the origin of the term.

The first one has initially been proposed by the 17th-century Dalmatian historian Johannes Lucius, who suggested that Morlach would have been derived from the Byzantine Greek Μαυροβλάχοι, Maurovlachoi, meaning "Black Latins" (from Greek: μαύρο, mauro, meaning "dark", "black"), that is "Black Vlachs". Lucius based his theory on the Doclean Chronicle, which he published and promoted. He explained that the choice made by the Venetians to use this name was made to distinguish the Morlachs from the White Latins, who would have been the inhabitants of the former Roman coastal cities of Dalmatia. This theory has had a strong echo in Romanian historiography, and Romanian scholars such as Cicerone Poghirc and Ela Cosma have suggested that the term "Morlachs" also meant "Northern Vlachs", derived from the Indo-European practice of indicating cardinal directions by colors. Petar Skok suggested that while the Latin maurus is derived from the Greek μαύρος ("dark"), the diphthongs au > av indicates a specific Dalmato-Romanian lexical remnant.

The other theory, mostly suggested by Croatian historiography of the previous centuries, states that Morlachs means "Vlachs near the sea", from the Serbo-Croatian more ("sea"), and vlah ("vlach"). The first reference to this theory comes from the 18th-century priest Alberto Fortis, who wrote extensively about the Morlachs in his book Viaggio in Dalmazia ("Journey to Dalmatia", 1774).

== Origin and culture ==
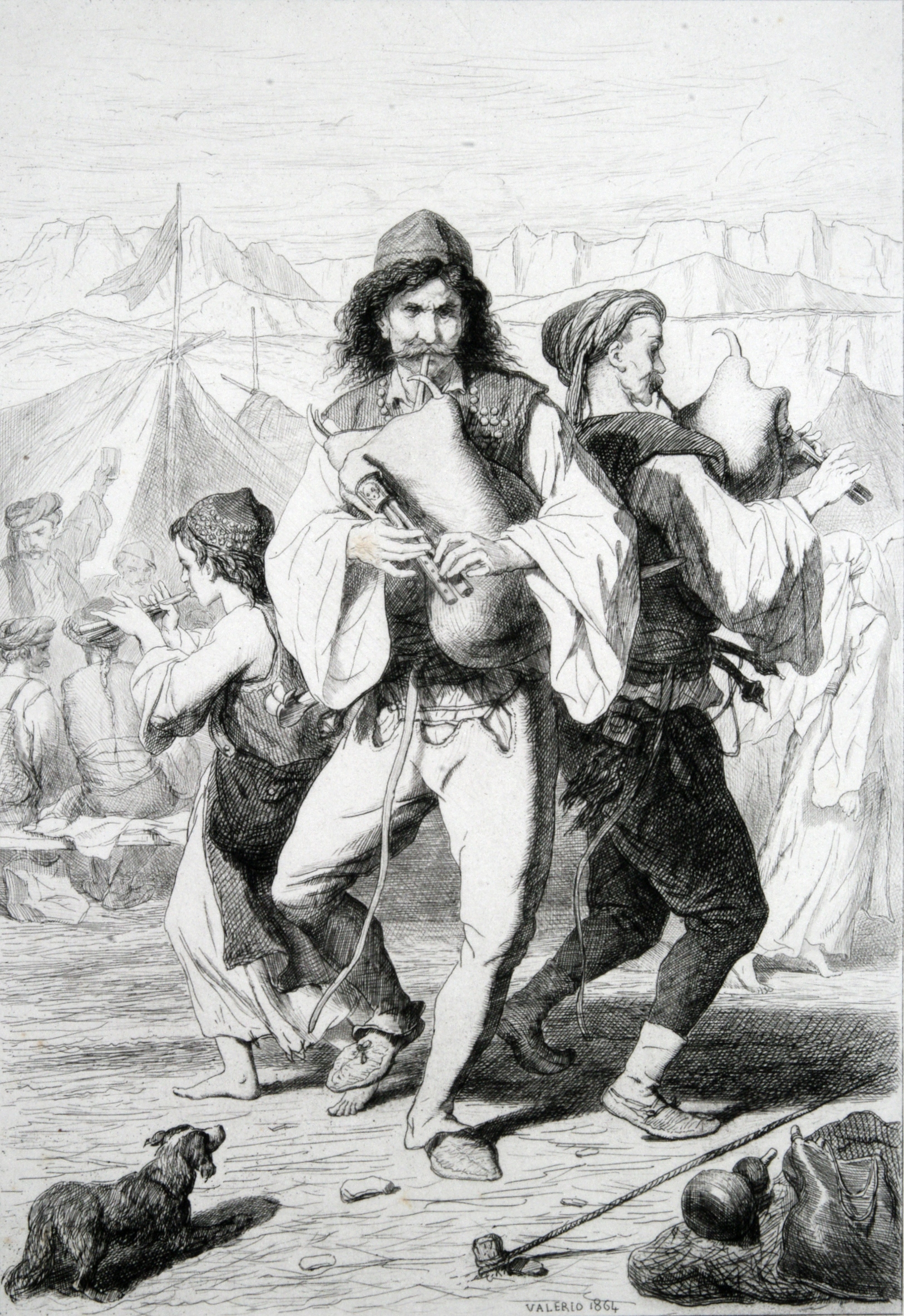
Morlach musicians from Salona (in modern Croatia), Théodore Valerio, 1864

The Morlachs are first mentioned in Dalmatian documents from the 14th century, but after the Ottoman conquest of Bosnia in 1463 and especially from the 16th century onwards, "Morlach" was used by the Venetians to refer usually to the Ottoman population from the Dalmatian hinterland, across the border from Venetian Dalmatia, regardless of their ethnic, religious or social belonging. While their name could imply some relation to the Romance-speaking Vlachs, travel accounts from the 17th and 18th century attest that the Morlachs were linguistically Slavs. The same travel accounts indicate that the Morlachs were mostly of the Eastern Orthodox faith, though some were also Roman Catholic. According to Romanian historian Dana Caciur, in Venetian eyes the Morlach community could represent a mixture of Vlachs, Croats, Serbs, Bosnians and other people as long as they shared lifestyle.

They made their living as shepherds and merchants, as well as soldiers. They neglected agricultural work, usually did not have gardens and orchards besides those growing naturally, and had for the time old farming tools, Lovrić explaining it as: "what our ancestors did not do, neither will we". Morlach families had herds numbering from 200 to 600, while the poorer families around 40 to 50, from which they received milk, and made various dairy products.

Contemporary I. Lovrić said that the Morlachs were Slavs who spoke better Slavic than the Ragusans (owing to the growing Italianization of the Dalmatian coast). Boško Desnica (1886–1945), after analysing Venetian papers, concluded that the Venetians undifferentiated the Slavic people in Dalmatia and labeled the language and script of the region as "Illirico" (Illyrian) or "Serviano" ["Serbian", particularly when referring to the language of the Morlachs or Vlachs in Dalmatia]. Language, idiom, characters/letters are always accompanied by the adjective Serb or Illyrian, when it is a matter of the military always is used term "cavalry (cavalleria) croata", "croato", "militia (milizia) croata" while the term "Slav" (schiavona) was used for the population. Lovrić made no distinction between the Vlachs/Morlachs and the Dalmatians and Montenegrins, whom he considered Slavs, and was not at all bothered by the fact that the Morlachs were predominantly Orthodox Christian. Fortis noted that there was often conflict between the Catholic and Orthodox Morlachs. Croatian Roman Catholic bishop Mile Bogović concluded based on records of that time that the entire population along the Ottoman-Venetian border in Dalmatia was designated Morlachs, the only difference within the community was religious affiliation.

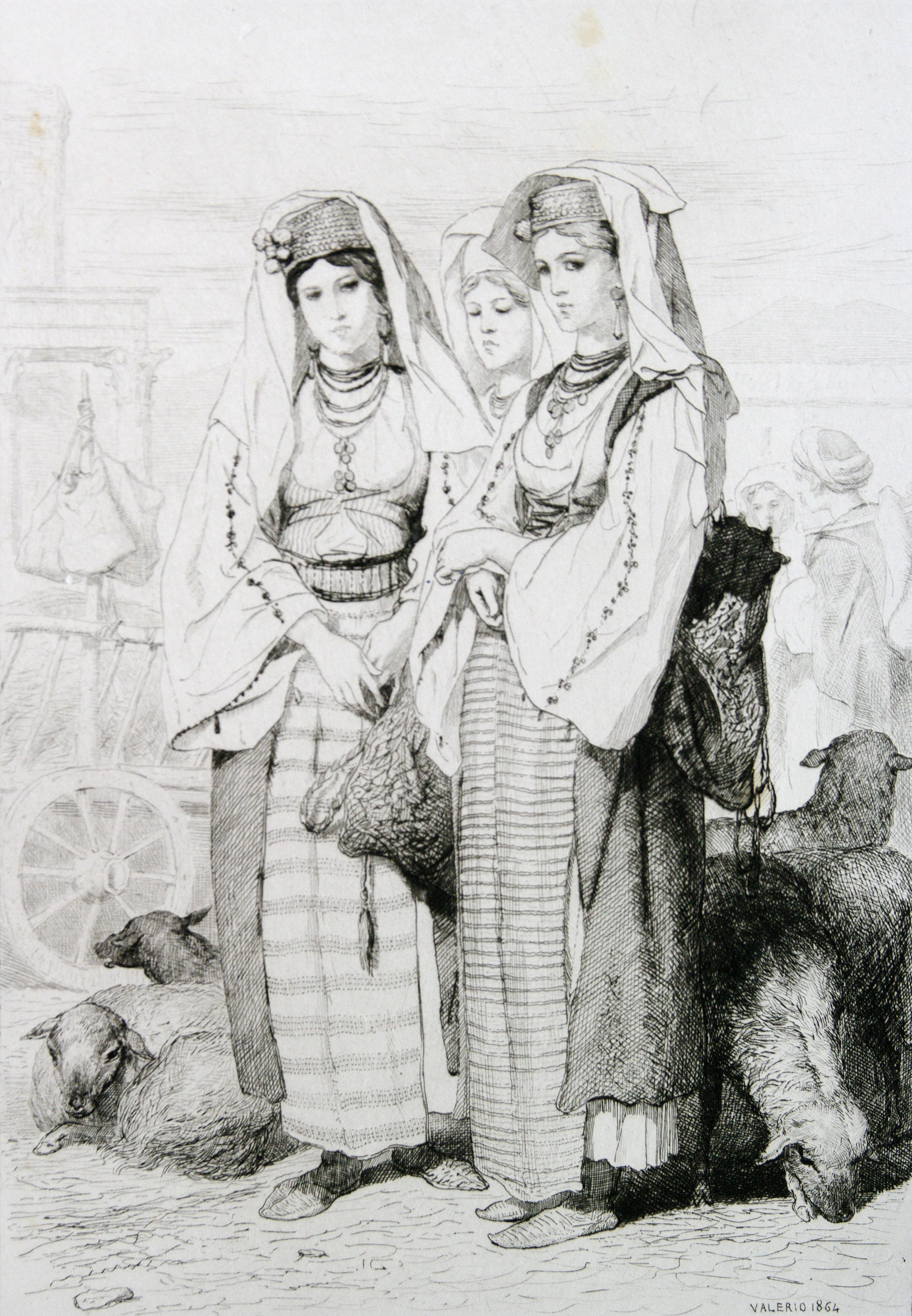
Morlach peasant women from around Spalato (in modern Croatia), 1864

In his book, Viaggio in Dalmazia, Fortis presented the poetry of the Morlachs, publishing several specimen of Morlach songs. Fortis spotted the physical difference between Morlachs; those from around Kotor, Sinj and Knin were generally blond-haired, with blue eyes, and broad faces, while those around Zadvarje and Vrgorac were generally brown-haired with narrow faces. They also differed in nature. Although they were often seen by urban dwellers as strangers and "those people" from the periphery, in 1730 provveditore Zorzi Grimani described them as "ferocious, but not indomitable" by nature, Edward Gibbon called them "barbarians", and Fortis praised their "noble savagery", moral, family, and friendship virtues, but also complained about their persistence in keeping to old traditions. He found that they sang melancholic verses of epic poetry related to the Ottoman occupation, accompanied with the traditional single-stringed instrument called gusle. Fortis gave translation of folk song Hasanaginica at the end of his book. Manfred Beller and Joep Leerssen identified the cultural traits of the Morlachs as being part of the South Slavic and Serb ethnotype. Fortis' work started a literary movement in Italian, Ragusan and Venetian literature: Morlachism, dedicated at the Morlachs, their customs and several other aspects of them.

== History ==
=== Early history ===
The use of Morlachs is first attested in 1344, when Morolacorum are mentioned in lands around Knin and Krbava during the conflict between the counts of the Kurjaković and Nelipić families. The first mention of the term Morlachs is simultaneous with the appearance of Vlachs in the documents of Croatia in the early 14th century; in 1321, a local priest on the island of Krk granted land to the church ("to the lands of Kneže, which are called Vlach"), while in 1322 Vlachs were allied with Mladen Šubić at the battle in the hinterland of Trogir. According to Mužić in those early documents there is no identifiable differentiation between the terms Vlach and Morlach. In 1352, in the agreement in which Zadar sold salt to the Republic of Venice, Zadar retained part of the salt that Morlachi and others exported by land. In 1362, the Morlachorum, settled, without authorization, on lands of Trogir and used it for pasture for a few months. In the Statute of Senj dating to 1388, the Frankopans mentioned Morowlachi and defined the amount of time they had for pasture when they descended from the mountains. In 1412, the Murlachos captured the Ostrovica Fortress from Venice. In August 1417, Venetian authorities were concerned with the "Morlachs and other Slavs" from the hinterland, who were a threat to security in Šibenik. Authorities of Šibenik in 1450 gave permission to enter the city to Morlachs and some Vlachs who called themselves Croats who were in the same economic and social position at that time.

According to historian Fine Jr., the early Vlachs probably lived on Croatian territory even before the 14th century, being the progeny of romanized Illyrians and pre-Slavic Romance-speaking people. (Note: Among surnames held to be of Romance roots, according to Božidar Ručević, editor of Rodoslovlje, are Abras(ević), Anzul(ulović), Bandul(a), Barut, Basar(ić), Basta(sić), Bazina, Beara, Bokul(ić), Botun, Brbat, Brbatović, Bulat, Bumbak, Buza(j), Buzancic, Dančul(o), Domin, Drakul(ić), Džakul(a), Gavela, Kacan, Katul(ić), Kekez, Kožul(j), Mamula, Marul(ić), Mastela, Matavulj, Sanader, Šerbula, Štedul, Šugar, Šuker, Vatav, Vrsal(o), Žužul. Croatian linguist Petar Šimunović (1933–2014) identified surnames with Romance word roots in the Croatian onomasticon.) Kosovan historian Zef Mirdita (1936–2016) regarded pastoralism as specific to ethnic Romance Vlachs. (Note: He views pastoralism as specific for Vlachs as seen in the third chapter of eight book in Alexiad, 12th-century work by Anna Komnene, where along Bulgars are mentioned tribes who live a nomadic life usually called Vlachs. The term "Vlach" was found in many medieval documents, often mentioned alongside other ethnonyms, thus, Zef Mirdita claims that this was more an ethnic than just a social-professional category. Although the term was used for both an ethnic group and pastoralists, P. S. Nasturel emphasized that there existed other general expressions for pastors.) According to Croatian historian Ivan Mužić (1934–2021), the Romance Vlachs who practiced shepherding first inhabited the Velebit-Dinara and then descended in the 14th and 15th centuries into the valleys and mixed with the agricultural Croats, losing their Romance language. Mužić believed that a part of them still spoke Romance or were bilingual in the 15th century, while he viewed the Istro-Romanians (those of Lake Čepić in Istria, and Krk) as descendants of this Velebit-Dinara group. He also claimed that Croats of the Dinara, Svilaja, Promina, below the Velebit, in Bukovica and in Moseć adopted shepherding and became "Morlachs" upon the Ottoman rule in the region, by this time the Romance language having been lost in the area and the only "Vlach" element being pastoralism, with the joining of martolos organization finalizing it. In the 15th century Ćićarija was settled by migrants from southeast of Velebit, and in the period of 1555–1650 Istria was settled by migrants from Venetian Zadar area, both communities today still speaking the Shtokavian-Chakavian dialect with Ikavian accent. There were shepherds from Bukovica that tended on Velebit and were Slavic-speaking but counted sheep in Romance in the 1970s and 1980s. (Note: The "Vlach" or "Romanian" traditional system of counting sheep in pairs do (two), pato (four), šasto (six), šopći (eight), zeći (ten) has been preserved in some mountainous regions of Dalmatian Zagora, Bukovica, Velebit, and Ćićarija according to Jelka Vince-Pallua (1992). Recordings of individual cases were made in the 1970s and 1980s among Bukovica shepherds on the Velebit.)

The Istro-Romanians, and other Vlachs (or Morlachs), had settled Istria (and mountain Ćićarija) after the various devastating outbreaks of the plague and wars between 1400 and 1600, reaching the island of Krk. In 1465 and 1468, there are mentions of "Morlach" judge Gerg Bodolić and "Vlach" peasant Mikul, in Krk and Crikvenica, respectively. In the second half of the 15th century the island of Krk was settled by mostly Catholic Croatian Vlachs migrating from the area of southern Velebit and Dinara, together with some Eastern Romance-speaking population. The Venetian colonization of Istria (and Ćićarija) occurred not later than the early 1520s, and there were several cases when "Vlachs" returned to Dalmatia. According to Italian philologist Alvise Andreose, the Istro-Romanians may be a residual branch of the maurovalacchi Romance shepherds "that were mentioned in Bosnia, Serbia and Croatia in the Late Middle Ages" and mentioned in Istria in the 15th and 16th centuries.

=== 16th century ===
Although the first Ottoman invasion of Croatia took place in the early 15th century, the threat to Dalmatian towns began only after the conquest of Bosnia in 1463. During the Ottoman–Venetian war of 1499-1502, a considerable demographic shift took place in the Dalmatian hinterland, leading to the abandonment of many of the region settlements by their previous inhabitants. During the years following the Ottoman conquest of Skradin and Knin in 1522, local Ottoman rulers started to resettle the depopulated areas with their Vlach subjects. Referred to as Morlachs in the Venetian records, the newcomers to Šibenik hinterland (Serbo-Croatian: Zagora) came from Herzegovina and among them, three Vlach clans (katuns) predominated: the Mirilovići, the Radohnići, and the Vojihnići.

At the same time, the Austrian Empire established the Military Frontier, which served as a buffer zone against Ottoman incursions. Thus, other Vlachs, Slavicized Vlachs and Serbs fled the Ottomans and settled in this area. As a consequence, Vlachs (Note: "Vlachs", referring to pastoralists, since the 16th century was a common name for Serbs in the Ottoman Empire and later. Tihomir Đorđević points to the already known fact that the name "Vlach" didn't only refer to genuine Vlachs or Serbs but also to cattle breeders in general. In the work About the Vlachs from 1806, Metropolitan Stevan Stratimirović states that Roman Catholics from Croatia and Slavonia scornfully used the name "Vlach" for "the Slovenians (Slavs) and Serbs, who are of our, Eastern confession (Orthodoxy)", and that "the Turks in Bosnia and Serbia also call every Bosnian or Serbian Christian a Vlach" (T. Đorđević, 1984:110).) were used by both the Ottomans on one side, and Austria and Venice on the other.

From the 16th century onwards, the name "Morlach" became specifically used by the Venetians to refer the any inhabitant of the hinterland, as opposed to those of the coastal towns, in an area stretching from the north of Kotor to the Kvarner Gulf region. In particular, the area around the Velebit mountain range was largely populated by Morlachs, to the extent that the Venetians called it Montagne della Morlacca ("mountain of the Morlachs"), while they used the name Canale della Morlacca to designate the Velebit Channel.

Between the end of the War of Cyprus in 1573 and the start of the Cretan War in 1645, trading relations between the Venetian Republic and the Ottoman Empire improved significantly. As the border region between the two, Dalmatia became a dynamic center of these relations. In particular, Morlachs from the hinterland played an important role in trade, bringing corn, meat, cheese and wool to towns like Šibenik, and buying fabrics, jewelry, clothing, delicacies and, above all, salt. During this period, a significant number of Morlachs immigrated to the Venetian side near Šibenik, either temporarily or permanently. These migrations were mainly in search of employment as soldiers or servants, or through "mixed" marriages. Most of these Morlach migrants came from the areas of Zagora, Petrovo Polje, the Miljevci plateau and the Cetina valley.

In 1579, several groups of Morlachs immigrated and requested to be employed as military colonists. Initially, there were some tensions between these immigrants and the established Uskoks. In 1593, provveditore generale (Overseer) Cristoforo Valier mentioned three nations constituting the Uskoks: the "natives of Senj, Croatians, and Morlachs from the Turkish parts".

=== 17th century ===
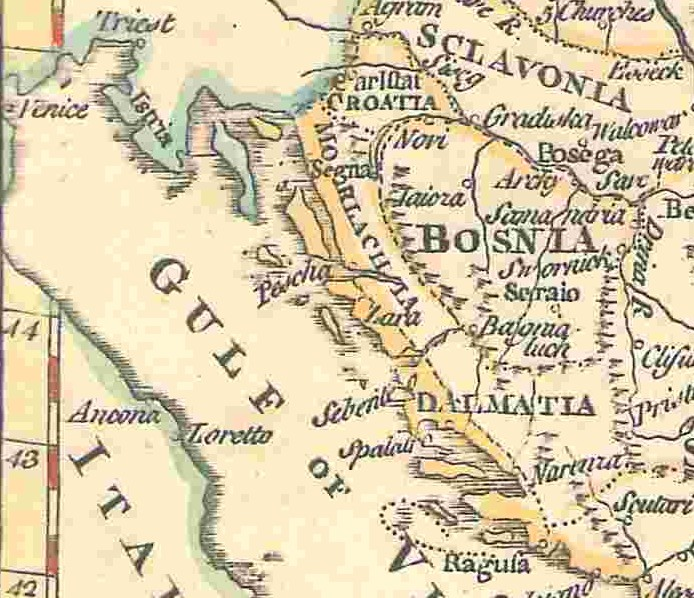
"Morlachia" in the 17th century, map by Thomas Jefferys (1785).

At the time of the Cretan War (1645–69) and Morean War (1684–99), a large number of Morlachs settled inland of the Dalmatian towns, and Ravni Kotari of Zadar. They were skilled in warfare and familiar with local territory, and served as paid soldiers in both Venetian and Ottoman armies. Their activity was similar to that of the Uskoks. Their military service granted them land, and freed them from trials, and gave them rights which freed them from full debt law (only 1/10 yield), thus many joined the so-called "Morlach" or "Vlach" armies.

At the time, some notable Morlach military leaders (Note: The head leaders in Venice, Ottoman and local Slavic documents were titled as capo, capo direttore, capo principale de Morlachi (J. Mitrović), governatnor delli Morlachi (S. Sorić), governator principale (I. Smiljanić), governator (Š. Bortulačić), gospodin serdar s vojvodami or lo dichiariamo serdar; serdar, and harambaša.) who were also enumerated in epic poetry, were: Janko Mitrović, Ilija and Stojan Janković, Petar, Ilija and Franjo Smiljanić, Stjepan and Marko Sorić, Vuk Mandušić, Ilija Perajica, Šimun Bortulačić, Božo Milković, Stanislav Sočivica, and Counts Franjo and Juraj Posedarski. Divided by religion, the Mitrović-Janković family were the leaders of Orthodox Morlachs, while the Smiljanić family were leaders of Catholic Morlachs.

After the dissolution of the Republic of Venice in 1797, and loss of power in Dalmatia, the term Morlach would disappear from use.

== Legacy ==
During the time of Enlightenment and Romanticism, Morlachs were seen as the "model of primitive Slavdom", and the "spirits of pastoral Arcadia Morlacchia". They attracted the attention of travel writers like 17th-century Jacob Spon and Sir George Wheler, and 18th-century writers Johann Gottfried Herder and Johann Wolfgang von Goethe, who labeled their poems as "Morlackisch". In 1793, at the carnival in Venice, a play about Morlachs, Gli Antichi Slavi ("antique Slavs"), was performed, and in 1802 it was reconceived as a ballet Le Nozze dei Morlacchi. At the beginning of the 20th century, still seen as relics from the primitive past and a byword for barbarous people, they may have inspired science fiction novelist H. G. Wells in his depiction of the fictional Morlocks. Thomas Graham Jackson described Morlach women as half-savages wearing "embroidered leggings thet give them the appearance of Indian squaws". In the 20th century, Alice Lee Moqué, as did many other women travelers, in her 1914 travelogue Delightful Dalmatia emphasized the "barbaric gorgeousness" of the sight of Morlach women and men in their folk costumes, which "made Zara's Piazza look like a stage setting", and regretted the coming of new civilization.

In the Balkans, the term became derogatory, indicating people from the mountains and backward people, and became disliked by the Morlachs themselves.

Italian cheese Morlacco, also named as Morlak, Morlach, Burlach, or Burlacco, was named after Morlach herders and woodsmen who lived and made it in the region of Monte Grappa. "Morlacchi" remains attested as an Italian family name.

== See also ==
- Morlacchi
- Vlachs in the history of Croatia
- Statuta Valachorum
- Morlachs (Venetian irregulars)
- Vlachs (social class)

== Sources ==
Primary sources

- Fortis, Alberto (1778). Travels Into Dalmatia: Containing General Observations on the Natural History of that Country and the Neighboring Islands; the Natural Productions, Arts, Manners and Customs of the Inhabitants. London: J. Robson.
- Lovrić, Ivan (1776). Osservazioni sopra diversi pezzi del Viaggio in Dalmazia del signor abate Alberto Fortis coll'aggiunta della Vita di Soçivizça (in Italian). Venice: Presso Francesco Sansoni.

Books

- Beller, Manfred; Leerssen, Joseph Theodoor (2007). Imagology: The Cultural Construction and Literary Representation of National Characters. Rodopi. ISBN 978-9042023178.
- Cosma, Ela (2011). "Vlahii Negri. Silviu Dragomir despre identitatea morlacilor" [Black Vlachs. Silviu Dragomir about the identity of the Morlachs]. In Pop, Ion-Aurel; Şipoş, Sorin (eds.). Silviu Dragomir – 120 de ani de la naştere [Silviu Dragomir – 120 years anniversary] (PDF). Oradea: University of Oradea. pp. 107–128.
- Fine, John Van Antwerp Jr. (2006). When ethnicity did not matter in the Balkans. University of Michigan Press. ISBN 0472025600.
- Mužić, Ivan (2010). Vlasi u starijoj hrvatskoj historiografiji (PDF) (in Croatian). Split: Muzej hrvatskih arheoloških spomenika. ISBN 978-953-6803-25-5.
- Naimark, Norman M.; Case, Holly (2003). Yugoslavia and Its Historians: Understanding the Balkan Wars of the 1990s. Stanford University Press. ISBN 978-0-8047-4594-9.
- Roksandić, Drago (2003). Triplex Confinium, Ili O Granicama I Regijama Hrvatske Povijesti 1500–1800 (PDF) (in Croatian). Zagreb: Barbat. pp. 140, 141, 151, 169.
- Suppan, Arnold; Graf, Maximilian (2010). From the Austrian Empire to the Communist East Central Europe. LIT Verlag Münster. ISBN 978-3-643-50235-3.
- Wolff, Larry (2002). Venice and the Slavs: The Discovery of Dalmatia in the Age of Enlightenment. Stanford University Press. ISBN 0804739463.

Journals

- Mirdita, Zef (2001). "Tko su Maurovlasi odnosno Nigri Latini u "Ljetopisu popa Dukljanina"" [Who are the Maurovlachs or Nigri Latini in the "Chronicle of the Priest of Duklja"]. Croatica Christiana Periodica (in Croatian). 47 (47). Zagreb: 17–27.
- Caciur, Dana (2020). "(Re)searching the Morlachs and the Uskoks: The Challenges of Writing about Marginal People from the Border Region of Dalmatia (Sixteenth Century)". Cromohs - Cyber Review of Modern Historiography. 23: 28–43. doi:10.36253/cromohs-12193. ISSN 1123-7023.
- Juran, Kristijan (2014). "Doseljavanje Morlaka u opustjela sela šibenske Zagore u 16. stoljeću" [The settlement of Morlachs in the deserted villages of the Šibenik hinterland in the 16th century]. Povijesni prilozi (in Croatian). 46.
- Juran, Kristijan (2015). "Morlaci u Šibeniku između Ciparskoga i Kandijskog rata (1570. – 1645.)" [Morlachs in Šibenik between the Cypriot and Cretan Wars (1570-1645)]. Povijesni prilozi (in Croatian). 49.
- Vince-Pallua, Jelka (1992). "Tragom vlaških elemenata kod Morlaka srednjodalmatinskog zaleđa". Ethnologica Dalmatica. 1 (1). Zagreb: University of Zagreb: 137–145.
