= Sinobad =

Sinobad (Serbian Cyrillic: Синобад) was a Serb family of Kninska Krajina ("Knin Krajina"), part of the so-called "Morlachs", a community in the Dalmatian hinterland that fought for the Republic of Venice against the Ottoman Empire. The Sinobad family moved to Venetian Dalmatia from Herzegovina in the second half of the 17th century.

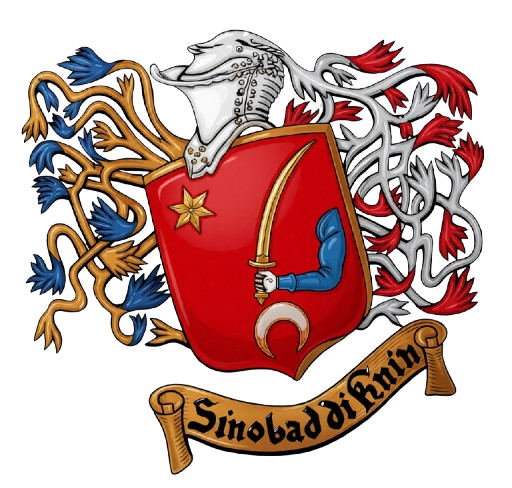
Coat of arms of Sinobad family

== Members ==
- Petar Sinobad (fl. 1654–d. 1684), hajduk
  - Mitar Sinobad (fl. 1654–d. 1684), Venetian soldier
  - Filip Sinobad (fl. 1691–d. 1694), hajduk barjaktar and serdar of Kninska Krajina (1691–94)
  - Jovan Sinobad (fl. 1691–d. 1715), Venetian knight (cavalieri di San Marco, 1696)

== Descendants ==
- Siniša Sinobad, Yugoslav pilot

== See also ==
- Morlachs
- Morlachs (Venetian irregulars)
- Vuk Mandušić (fl. 1648), military commander in Venetian service
- Stojan Janković (1636–1687), Morlach leader
- Stanislav Sočivica, Venetian rebel
- Cvijan Šarić
- Petronije Selaković
- Bajo Pivljanin
- Grujica Žeravica
- Vukosav Puhalović
- Ilija Smiljanić
- Petar Smiljanić
- Vuk Močivuna
- Juraj Vranić
- Tadije Vranić
