= Petronije Selaković =

Serbian Orthodox monk

Petronije Selaković (Serbian Cyrillic: Петроније Селаковић; fl. April 1648) was a Serbian Orthodox monk of the Krka monastery who led a Morlach army during the Cretan War (1645–69) against the Ottoman Empire. His army came as far as the Sava river (April 1648).

== See also ==
- Petar Jagodić
- Matija Žabetić
- Ilija Nanić
- Morlachs
- Morlachs (Venetian irregulars)
- Vuk Mandušić (fl. 1648), military commander in Venetian service
- Stojan Janković (1636–1687), Morlach leader
- Stanislav Sočivica, Venetian rebel
- Sinobad
- Cvijan Šarić
- Bajo Pivljanin
- Grujica Žeravica
- Vukosav Puhalović
- Ilija Smiljanić
- Petar Smiljanić
- Vuk Močivuna
- Juraj Vranić
- Tadije Vranić
