= Ivan Lovrić =

Croatian writer, ethnographer, and medical student (1756–1777)

Ivan Lovrić (Croatian pronunciation: [ǐʋan lǒːʋrit͡ɕ]; c. 1756 in Sinj – 1777 in Sinj), also known as Giovanni Lovrich, was a Croatian writer, ethnographer, and medical student from the Republic of Venice, best known for his work Observations on 'Travels in Dalmatia' of Abbot Alberto Fortis.

== Biography ==
Born in Sinj to a relatively wealthy Croatian merchant family, Lovric studied linguistics in Venice and then medicine in Padua. His early death in 1777 was preceded by numerous works, most notably Osservazioni di Giovanni Lovrich sopra diversi pezzi del viaggio in Dalmazia del signor abbot Alberto Fortis coll'aggiunta della vita di Soçivizça ("Observations of Giovanni Lovrich [Ivan Lovrić] on several pieces of the journey to Dalmatia of Mr. Abbot Alberto Fortis with the addition of the life of Soçivizça") (1776), including a history of the life of Stanislav Sočivica, and An Apologetic Letter by Ivan Lovrić to the distinguished Mr. Antonio Lorgna (1777).
