= Zečevo Rogozničko =

Croatian village

- Location within Croatia
- Coordinates: 43°58′56″N 15°52′02″E
- Country: Croatia
- County: Šibenik-Knin
- Municipality: Rogoznica

Area
  - Total: 4.5 km^{2} (1.7 sq mi)

Population (2021)
  - Total: 234
  - Density: 52/km^{2} (130/sq mi)
- Time zone: UTC+1 (CET)
  - Summer (DST): UTC+2 (CEST)

Zečevo Rogozničko is a Croatian village in the Šibenik-Knin County, near the town of Rogoznica. It is located in the Dalmatia region. The population is 195 (2011 census).

Zečevo became known widely known in Croatia during the Croatian War of Independence, when a Croatian volunteer army hit two planes of the Yugoslav Army during the aerial bombing, and one of the soldiers shouted triumphantly: "Both went down!" This moment was captured on video and was broadcast throughout the country.
