= Posedarje =

- Municipality
- Coat of arms

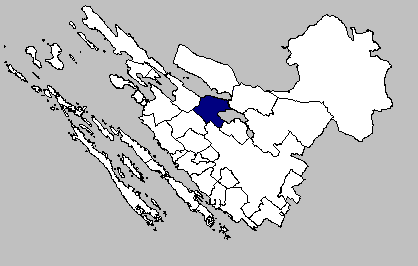
- Posedarje municipality within Zadar County
- Interactive map of Posedarje
- Location of Posedarje in Croatia
- Coordinates: 44°18′45″N 15°28′36″E
- Country: Croatia
- Region: Dalmatia
- County: Zadar County

Area
  - Municipality: 77.5 km^{2} (29.9 sq mi)
  - Urban: 14.5 km^{2} (5.6 sq mi)

Population (2021)
  - Municipality: 3,430
  - Density: 44.3/km^{2} (115/sq mi)
  - Urban: 1,286
  - Urban density: 88.7/km^{2} (230/sq mi)
- Website: opcina-posedarje.hr

Posedarje (Croatian pronunciation: [pǒsedaːrje], Italian: Possedaria) is a municipality in Zadar County of Croatia with 3,607 inhabitants (2011 census).

== Demographics ==
In 2021, the municipality had 3,430 residents in the following 7 settlements:

- Grgurice, population 148
- Islam Latinski, population 314
- Podgradina, population 631
- Posedarje, population 1286
- Slivnica, population 785
- Vinjerac, population 173
- Ždrilo, population 93
Posedarje: Population trends 1857–2021
v

population	1687	1641	1938	2058	2301	2686	2886	3246	3552	3884	4110	4250	3990	3995	3513	3607	3430
	1857	1869	1880	1890	1900	1910	1921	1931	1948	1953	1961	1971	1981	1991	2001	2011	2021

Sources: Croatian Bureau of Statistics publications
