= Smiljanić family =

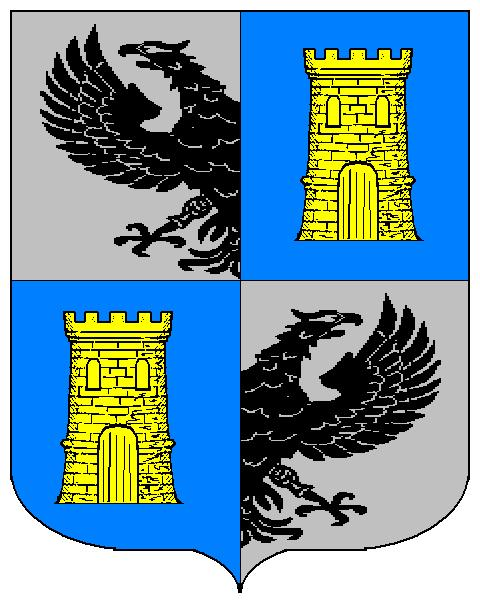
Coat of arms of Smiljanić family

The Smiljanić family (Smogianich) were a Vlach/Morlach family originating from Lika and first mentioned in the 17th century, when the oldest member Petar Smiljanić was a harambaša and capo (head) of the Morlach troops in Venetian service during the Cretan War (1645–69), in Venetian Dalmatia. He was born in Udbina, in the Lika region, then moved with his family to Venetian Dalmatia (Ravni Kotari) in 1647. From the family originated nine serdars, who participated in the Cretan War (1645–69) and Morean War (1684–1699). The family and its members are perceived as Croatian in Croatian historiography.

== History ==
Enver Ljubović considered that the family is related to noble officer family Smoljan/Smoglian from Senj, recorded in the mid-16th century and serving military positions in the military units of Lika and Gacka. Petar Smiljanić was titled as capo (principale), and after arrival from Udbina to Dalmatia was included in the troops of commander Bosichi Renesi, and was noted for orderly holding his horse and weapons. Already in first battles with Ottoman forces, he became distinguished. He was instrumental in the takeover of Zemunik, Novigrad, Obrovac, Nadin and Vrana. Petar also led the attack on Gračac in Lika in 1647. First major intrusion into Turkish Croatia was in 1648 in the area of Unac, and soon Leonardo Foscolo named his commander of all forces in North Dalmatia. In July of the same year, he participated in the exhausting campaign led by count Frane Posedarski against fort Ribnik in Lika, where he died alongside Stipan Sorić. He had four sons, who had prominent roles in the Venetian-Ottoman wars, and who also died in the war against Ottomans; Ilija (1654), Filip (1656), Smiljan or Mate (1687), and Ivan or Marko (1693). After the extinction of the male line, the family spread on the female line; the sons of Petar's daughter Anka and certain Mihaljević - Smoljan, Marko, and Šimun, took mother's surname and continued the family tradition of warfare against the Ottomans.

In 1653 is mentioned his son, serdar Ilija Smiljanić, as governator principale of the Morlach troops and of all harambašas. The title of serdar is mentioned for the first time in Venetian official documents in 1656, when provveditore Zen instead of killed Filip Smiljanić placed Janko Mitrović for supreme serdar. Ilija was the most prominent member of the family, on the lead of uskoks from Lika and Ravni Kotari. He participated with c. 250-350 Morlachs (Uskoks) from Ravni Kotari in the conflict near Zečevo, on 31 July 1648, where died renowned Vuk Mandušić. With his troops he also defeated Ottomans in battles near Zvonigrad and Bilaj (1649), Korlati (1651), Ostrovica (1652), and Udbina and Livno (1653). He was noted for bravery during the raid in Lika, where died.

In 1686, Smiljan could not join Šimun Bortulačić and Stojan Janković in Sinj and Knin because he was bedridden and afflicted by podagra on his neck. At the end of summer 1686, Smoljan Smiljanić and Stojan Janković went on a big raid in the countryside of Livno due to rumours of vast Ottoman troops invasion, led by pasha Bastić and Ali-beg Filipović, with the intention to rebuild the land and fortifications. In the raid many houses and goods vanished, also there were many human casualties, with Janković and Smiljanić noting on 7 September that the whole valley of Livno within 50 miles (80.4 km) became desolated.

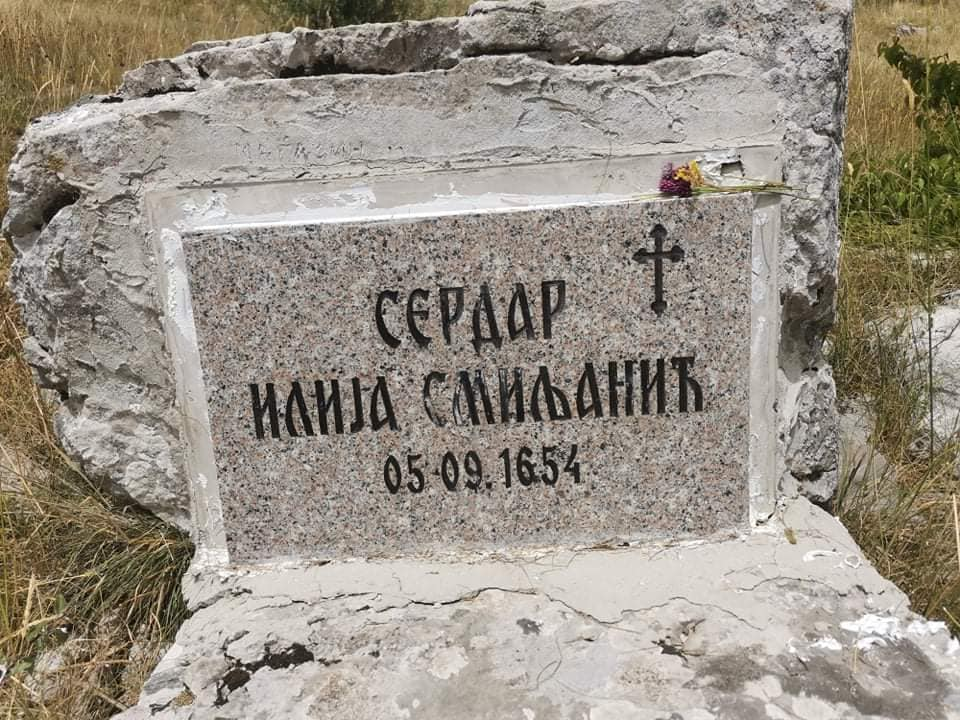
A modern memorial plaque placed on the supposed gravestones of the serdar Ilija Smiljanić located on the Vučjak gorge on the southeastern slopes of Mount Velebit, at the northern slope of Tremzina. The original inscription was in Latin alphabet, and the gravestone was without any inscription until 1975.

They were a very reputable family of good warriors and soldiers, steadily with reputation moving away from the common people and entered the Venetian nobility. Already in 1653 Venice donated a house in Zadar to Ilija Smiljanić. In the same year, Filip Smiljanić became the captain of the armoured troops of light cavalry, which was a big recognition. On 5 September 1654 at Vučjak in Velebit died Ilija Smiljanić. The serdar Smoljan Smiljanić, who succeeded Ilija, was gifted with 30 ducats monthly, chain of 100 ducats, scarlet dolman and so on. Smiljan Smiljanić received 10 ducats monthly. Since the earliest church documents from Zadar they were of Catholic and never of the Orthodox faith. It is considered that, roughly, members of the Smiljanić family were the leaders of Catholic Morlachs, while from Mitrović-Janković family of the Orthodox Morlachs. The progeny of the female line, Lazar received citizen status of Zadar in 1703, Lazar and priest Franjo or Frane received in 1793 entered the nobility from Nin, and 1796 from Zadar. Son of Lazar, Antun, was a member of both noble councils. In 1822 Austrian authorities confirmed noble title only to Antun Ivan, by whose death in 1832 century the family became extinct.

== Legacy ==
Petar and Ilija Smiljanić were characters in Croatian epic poetry and were mentioned by Andrija Kačić Miošić in his poem Od vitezova dalmatinskih:

I pogibe Petre Smiljaniću
Na Krajini od Udbinom gradom:
Pogubi ga junak od Krajine,
Po imenu Ograšević Mujo
...
Pogibe nam na glasu delija
Po imenu Smiljanić Ilija,
Na Vučjaku ispod Velebita:
Pogubi ga Markić Radojica,
Koga trikrat vadi iz galije,
A četvrti s tanani višala.
Radojica raja ne vidija,
jer pogubi svoga poočima!

== See also ==
- Morlachs
- Morlachs (Venetian irregulars)
- Vlach (Ottoman social class)
- Cvijan Šarić
- Janko Mitrović
- Stojan Janković
- Vuk Mandušić
- Bajo Pivljanin
