= Ravni Kotari =

Coordinates: 44°11′32″N 15°18′28″E

- Geographic region^{a}
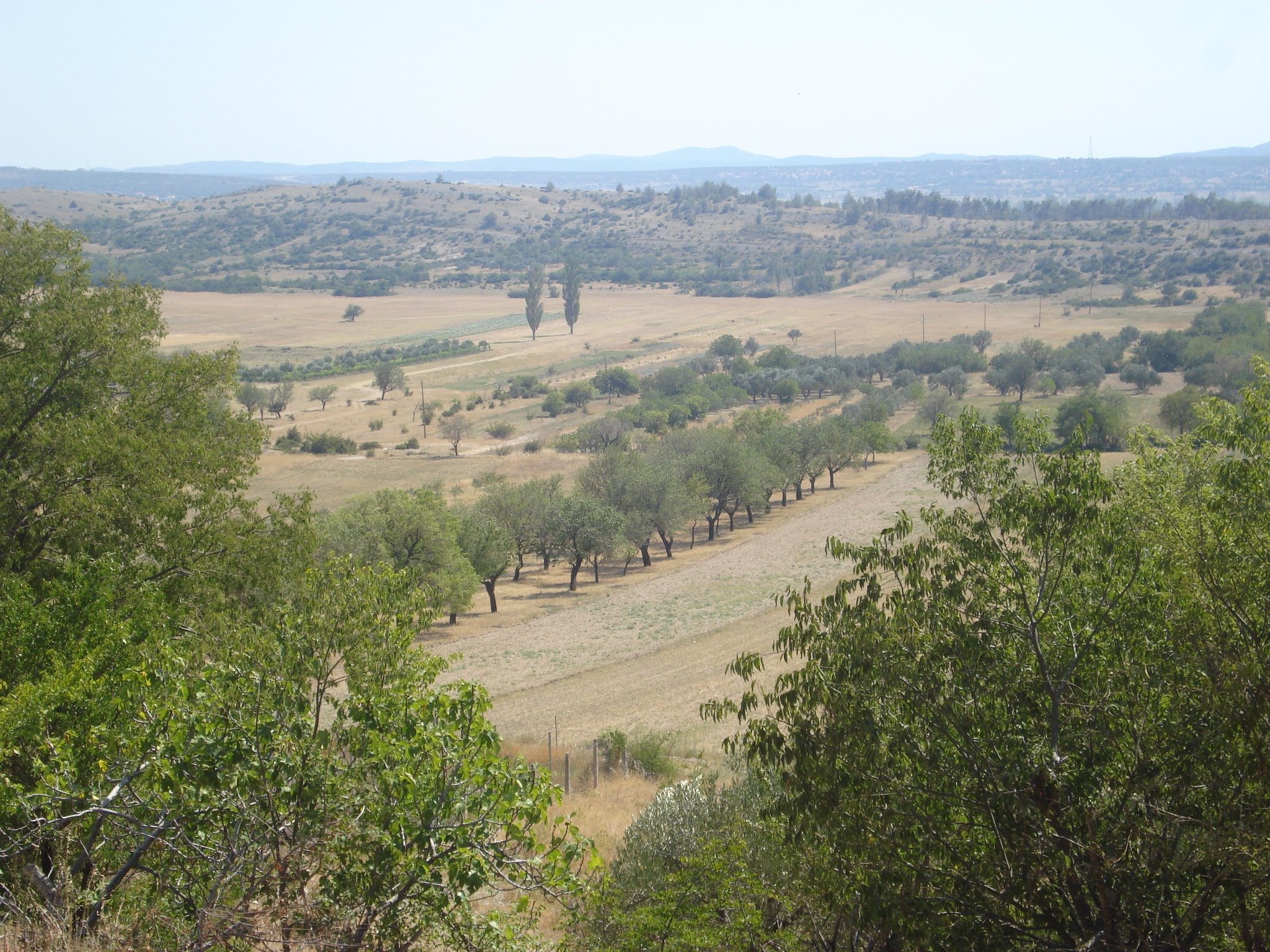
- Part of Ravni kotari seen from the village of Ostrovica to the south
- Etymology: Croatian: ravni kotari, lit. 'flat lands'
- Interactive map of Ravni Kotari
- Country: Croatia
- Largest town: Benkovac
- ^{a} Ravni Kotari is not designated as an official region, it is a geographic region only.

Ravni Kotari (Croatian: [ravniː kôtaːri]; English: Flatlands; Plains district) is a geographical region in Croatia. It lies in northern Dalmatia, around Zadar and east of it. It is bordered by Bukovica to the northeast, lower Krka to the southeast, and the Adriatic Sea. The largest settlement in the region is the town of Benkovac. Other large settlements are Zemunik Donji (where Zadar Airport is located), Polača, Poličnik, Galovac, Raštane donje i gornje, Gorica, Škabrnja, Posedarje, Pridraga, Novigrad, and Stankovci.

== See also ==
- Geography of Croatia
