= Morlachs (Venetian irregulars) =

- Leader: See list
- Dates active: 1645–1699
- Active regions: Dalmatian hinterland
- Ideology: Christianity
- Size: 1,500 (Cretan War)
- Part of: Venetian army
- Wars: the Cretan War (1645–69) and the Great Turkish War (1683–99)

The Morlach troops was an irregular military group in the Dalmatian hinterland, composed of Morlachs (a pre-modern ethnic identity of Slavic speaking people of diverse ethnic origin), that was hired by the Republic of Venice to fight the Ottoman Empire during the Cretan War (1645–69) and the Great Turkish War (1683–99).

== Leaders ==
The leaders, called harambaša (tr. "bandit leader") and serdar ("commander-in-chief"), held several titles in Venetian service.

Cretan War

- Stjepan Sorić, Catholic priest, "governator delli Morlachi"
- Ilija Smiljanić, "governator principale"
- Petar Smiljanić, "capo"
- Vuk Mandušić, "capo direttore"
- Janko Mitrović, "capo principale de Morlachi"
- Šimun Bortulačić, "governator"
- Jovan Dračevac, "governator"
- Petronije Selaković, Orthodox monk

== History ==
In order to effectively operate in the Cretan War (1645–69), a solid reorganization was needed, with an officer commanding over several harambaše. At first this position was undetermined. Priest Stjepan Sorić is mentioned as "governator delli Morlachi", Petar Smiljanić as "capo", Vuk Mandušić as "capo direttore", and Janko Mitrović as "capo principale de Morlachi", Jovan Dračevac as "governator" etc. This "Uskok" or "Morlach" army had less than 1,500 fighters.

== Legacy ==
The rebel fighters are enumerated in Croatian and Serbian epic poetry, of which there is a cyclus.

== See also ==
- Morlachs
- Vlachs of Croatia
- Vlach (Ottoman social class)

== Sources ==
- Tea Mayhew (2008). Dalmatia Between Ottoman and Venetian Rule: Contado Di Zara, 1645-1718. Viella. ISBN 978-88-8334-334-6.
