= Vuk Mandušić =

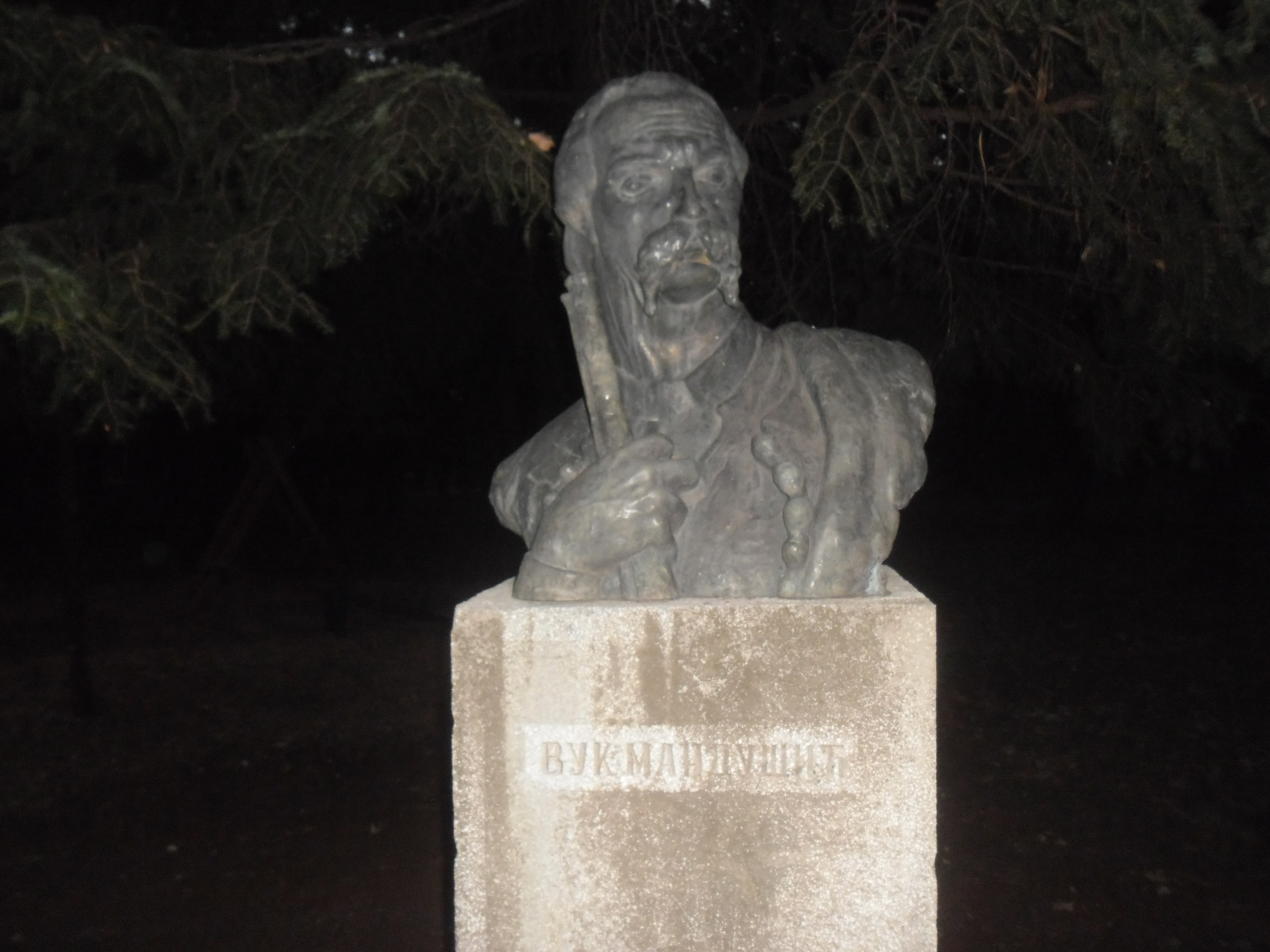
- Vuk Mandušić's bust in Cetinje, Montenegro
- Born: Dalmatian hinterland, Ottoman Empire (now Croatia)
- Died: 31 July 1648; Zečevo, Ottoman Empire (now Croatia)
- Military career
- Allegiance: Republic of Venice
- Service years: 1645-48
- Rank: "capo direttore de Morlacchi del territorio di Sebenico"
- Unit: Morlach irregulars
- Conflicts: Cretan War (1645–1669)

Vuk Mandušić (Serbian Cyrillic: Вук Мандушић; Vučen Mandušić, Vucen Mandussich; fl. 1645 – died 13 July 1648) was the capo direttore of the Morlach army, one of the most prominent harambaša (rebel leaders) in the Dalmatian hinterland, that fought the Ottoman Empire during the Cretan War (1645–69). He is one of the heroes renowned in both Croatian, Montenegrin and Serbian epic poetry. The Montenegro poet-prince-bishop Petar II Petrović Njegoš immortalized him in one of his epic poems, Gorski vjenac, also known in English translation as Mountain Wreath.

== Early and personal life ==
Mandušić was one of the leaders of Morlachs or Vlachs in Dalmatia, and his birthplace is undetermined, but it is generally considered he was born somewhere in the Dalmatian Zagora. Several localities in the hinterland of modern-day Šibenik-Knin County has been given: most commonly Rupe near Skradin, according to the oral tradition preserved in the work from 1756 by Franciscan friar Andrija Kačić Miošić, oral tradition about the ruins of his house, and the existence of the surname Mandušić to this day; and Petrovo polje. As Mandušić was included in the 19th century work by Petar II Petrović-Njegoš, under the influence of the work were given additional theories; he was from Velestovo and revolted in Kotari (Dalmatia), or that hailed from Tetovo (now in North Macedonia), before settling in Sredska, Kosovo, while others claim it was another person with the same name.

He adopted his sororal nephew Tadija Vrančić, son of Juraj Vrančić, who later signed himself as Mandušić (Mandussich alias Vrancich), and replaced Vuk upon his death and was appointed commander of the Šibenik "uskoks".

== Career ==
With the Cretan War (1645–69), a solid organization was needed, with an officer commanding over several Harambaša. At first this position was undetermined. Priest Stjepan S/Šorić is mentioned as "governator delli Morlachi", Petar Smiljanić as "capo", Vuk Mandušić as "capo direttore", and Janko Mitrović as "capo principale de Morlachi", Jovan Dračevac as "governator", and many others. This "Uskok" or "Morlach" army had less than 1,500 fighters. In late February 1648, he "jumped into" Venetian Dalmatia with Vlachs of Petrovo polje, fighting for five months.

The first information on Mandušić dates to February 1648, when mentioning the Venetian attack on Drniš and Knin, which Mandušić played a great role. In March and May the same year, he took part in the liberation of Klis, and Ključ (with 175 fighters), respectively. On 3 July is mentioned in a notice by Leonardo Foscolo about the plunder of Ključ and Turkish territory.

On 11 July is mentioned by Foscolo about the gold medal which received Stjepan S/Šorić in June that same year, who although a brave soldier and has many supporters, can not count on obedience, because with the soldiers is not generous, while if for the captain Mandušić came the second medal equal to that of Šorić, and he deserves it, it would've saved him the bitterness of exclusion, and to the nation would serve as a great consolation, because he is in the Krajina appreciated more than any other.

New Bosnian Pasha, Drviš Skopljak, who went down in Livno, in late July sent in Ravni Kotari his Kiaya-bey, Hussein-beg, with a detachment of 4,000 people. Hussein after looting Kotari reached the Biograd and Turanj, and with enormous loot was returning to the Knin. Foscolo, powerless to prevent Hussein's hike, sent out for Ilija Smiljanić with Kotari Uskoks, and Mandušić with Šibenik Uskoks, as an attempt to cut off their retreat and snatch the loot. In the conflict near Zečevo, on 31 July, he died while fighting, along with twenty soldiers and three or four harambaša. His death was reported by three harambašas, Ilija Smiljanić, Martin Milković, and Matija Mihaljević. His body was buried at the place of death, today probably near fort Zvečevo on the same-titled high ground.

On 5 August, Foscolo highly praised him and wrote From Šibenik arrived the confirmation on news of the death of poor Mandušić, whom let the Lord God grant heavenly abode, before he died avengeed the death of five Turks. He was indeed a brave soldier, modest and unselfishly governor, a trait that is rarely encountered in this nation, which in most can call rapacious. If he succeeded to loot something, all would share among the soldiers, who had so loved, worshiped and obeyed him as much as was afraid among the Turks. I vividly felt his loss, because of damage that will arise for the common good. He was enumerated in Alessandro Vernino's Della historia delle Guerre di Dalmatia (1648) as "Mandusich de Murlacchi". Today, what is thought to be Mandušić's metre-long sabre is kept at Visovac Monastery

== Legacy ==
He is mentioned in Cvit razgovora naroda i jezika iliričkoga aliti rvackoga (The Flower of Discourse among the Illyrian or Croatian People and Language, 1747) by Franciscan priest Filip Grabovac, and Razgovor ugodni naroda slovinskog (Pleasant Conversation of Slavic People, 1756) by Franciscan friar Andrija Kačić Miošić. Miošić said of him "a mighty hero, not only praised by the Dalmatians, and exalted, furthermore also praised by Latins in their books". In Croatian historiography, he is often called a Croat.

He is one of the heroes renowned in Serbian epic poetry. Epic poems starring Mandušić include Шеовић Осман, Мустајбег лички и Вук Мандушић, Удар на Вука Мандушића, and Два Куртића и Бојичић Алил. He is most notably included in The Mountain Wreath (1847) by Montenegrin Prince-Bishop Petar II Petrović-Njegoš. According to some Montenegrin historians of literature, Njegoš took him as a character from songs collected by Vuk Karadžić, or his name was popularized in Montenegro by contemporary Montenegrin soldiers like Bajo Pivljanin. He became an example of heroic character and behaviour of the Serbs. In Serbian historiography, he is called a Serb.

The authors of the Srpski list (late 19th century) from Split used names from the Mountain Wreath; Vuk Mandušić was one of the pseudonyms. Serbian-Canadian writer Radoje Vukčević used his name as a pseudonym. Croatian writer Nikola Pulić in 1989 wrote a novel Sablja Vuka Mandušića.
