= Serdar (Ottoman rank) =

Military rank in the Ottoman Empire

Serdar (Ottoman Turkish: سردار; from "Sardar"; Romanian: serdar) was a military rank in the Ottoman Empire, a military and boyar rank in early modern Moldavia and Wallachia, and a noble rank in Montenegro and Serbia. Serdars often served on the borders of the Ottoman Empire. The term is often translated as 'commander' in English texts and originally comes from the Persian language.

== Danubian Principalities ==
Initially the serdar appeared in Moldavia as the cavalry commander of Orhei, Lăpușna and, respectively, Soroca counties. These troops were organised in the 17th century mainly for the repulsion of the Cossacks, Crimean and Budjak Tatars. In rank, the Great Serdar (marele serdar) came immediately after the hetman. Later, in the 18th century (the "Phanariote era"), the serdarul de mazili was the captain of the rankless-boyar cavalry, and a middle-rank boyar.

In 18th century Wallachia, the Serdar was and caretaker of the princely manors, and manager of the postage service (he directed a company of soldiers, carriers and provision carts).

== Serbia and Montenegro ==
The title Serdar was also used in the Principality of Montenegro and the Principality of Serbia as an honorary non-noble title below that of vojvoda. Janko Vukotić, the former prime minister of Montenegro, held the title of serdar.

== Uses ==
- Serdar is a popular male name in Turkey.
- Serdar is a popular male name in Turkmenistan.
- Serdar-ı Ekrem or (Serdar-ı Azam) means the commander-in-chief with the highest rank, and thus, it sometimes refers to the Grand Vizier of the Ottoman Empire.
- Serdar is also used as a noun (especially to give a nostalgic feeling) with its original meaning (i.e. commander-in-chief) in Turkish. For example, "Ordunun serdarı yiğit savaşçılarına saldırı emrini verdi" means "The commander-in-chief of the force ordered his brave fighters to attack."
- The word has been adapted in English with its original or related spellings, i.e. serdar, sardar, sirdar, all meaning commander-in-chief of an army. However, these words are not used in everyday terminology.
- Serdar, a variant of Sirdar and Sardar, a long-standing rank in Western and Southern Asia – was assigned to the British Commander-in-Chief of the British-controlled Egyptian Army in the late 19th and early 20th centuries. The Sirdar resided at the Sirdaria, a three-block-long property in Zamalek which was also the home of British military intelligence in Egypt.

== See also ==
- Serdar or Gyzylarbat is a city in the Balkan province of Turkmenistan.
