= Harambaša =

Rank for a senior commander of a hajduk band

Harambaša (Serbian Cyrillic: Харамбаша) was the rank for a senior commander of a hajduk band (brigand gangs).

== Etymology ==
It is derived from the Turkish word for 'bandit leader' (Turkish: haramibaşı < haram 'bandit' + baş 'head') and, like some other Ottoman Turkish titles, was adopted into the irregular militias of Montenegrin, Serbian, and Croatian rebels (bimbaša, serdar, buljubaša).

== Usage ==
- Montenegrin hajduks
- Serbian hajduks
- Military Frontier: Seressaners, Pandurs, and others.
- Serbian Revolution, most of the supreme commanders were former harambaša's
- Military of Principality of Montenegro
- Serbian Orthodox tradition of Čuvari Hristovog Groba ("Keepers of Christ's Grave") in Vrlika, Croatia

== See also ==
- Harambašić, Serbian, Croatian and Bosniak surname
- Hussar, Hungarian origin light cavalry in Europe, word meaning "the best of twenty" or in Slavic etymology "pirate"
- Vojvoda, a civil and military administrator of Serbs in the Habsburg Monarchy
- Korun Aramija
- Ataman
