= Operation Steel '93 =

Serbian Krajina military counter-offensive

- Part of Operation Maslenica during the Croatian War of Independence
- The wider Zadar hinterland area.
Date	27 January – 1 March 1993
Location	Zadar hinterland, Maslenica
Result	Serbian Krajina victory: SVK successfully halted the main Croatian offensive
Territorial changes	SVK recaptured Škabrnja, Prkos, and the Mali Alan pass; frontline stabilized with a 3–5 km pushback in key sectors

Belligerents
Croatia	Serbian Krajina

Commanders and leaders
Janko Bobetko; Ante Gotovina; Boris Jacović; Mirko Norac; Mladen Markač; Marko Skejo (WIA)	Dragan Vasiljković; Željko Ražnatović; Milorad Ulemek; Veljko Milanković †; Mihajlo Ulemek

Units involved
Croatian Army (HV): 1st Guards Brigade; 2nd Guards Brigade; 3rd Guards Brigade; 4th Guards Brigade; "Vange" Naval Company; 7th Home Guard Regiment; Croatian Defence Forces (HOS): 9th Battalion Rafael Vitez Boban	Serbian Army of Krajina (SVK): 7th North Dalmatian Corps; Kninjas; Wolves of Vučjak; Serb Volunteer Guard; White Eagles

Strength
10,000	3,500 (initially); 8,000–8,500 (peak)

Casualties and losses
Dozens killed and 2 captured tanks	Unknown

Operation Steel '93 (Serbo-Croatian: Operacija Čelik '93 / Операција Челик '93) was a Serbian Krajina military counter-offensive launched in the Ravni Kotari region from 27 January to 22 March 1993. The operation was executed as a direct tactical response to the Croatian Army's Operation Maslenica, which had pushed back Serbian forces and seized critical infrastructure in the Zadar hinterland days prior.

The primary objective of the counter-offensive, spearheaded by the Serbian Army of Krajina (SVK) with significant reinforcement from local volunteers, the Serb Volunteer Guard, and elements of the Army of Republika Srpska (VRS), was to halt further Croatian advances and recapture lost territory. While the SVK failed to retake major coastal assets like the Maslenica Bridge, the counter-offensive successfully stabilized the 20-kilometre (12 mi) front line, pushed back Croatian forces along several sectors, and resulted in the recapture of strategic positions including Škabrnja, Prkos, and the Mali Alan mountain pass on the Velebit.

== Background ==
After the establishment of a ceasefire on 2 January 1993 between the governments of the Republic of Croatia and the Republic of Serbian Krajina, Croatian forces carried out only symbolic military actions over the course of twenty days the Republic of Serbian Krajina. Among these, the operation in Maslenica, which took place on 22 January 1993, stood out in particular. Thus, in an effort to gain control over the bridge and its surroundings in the area, the Croatian Army violated the UNPROFOR demarcation line and launched an offensive on 22 January at around 6 a.m. The attack began in the Zadar hinterland from several directions, but it was immediately clear that the main axis of attack was toward Maslenica. Auxiliary directions of attack were on Mount Velebit toward Gračac with the probable aim of cutting the Obrovac–Gračac line of communication, and from Sinj with the likely objective of capturing the dam and hydroelectric power plant at Peruća and its surroundings.

On the first day of the operation, the attack appeared well planned and organized, as a certain element of surprise was achieved against the Serbian side. In the following days, however, until the end of the operation, the Croatian Army acted in a rather haphazard and uncoordinated manner. In the village of Žegar near Obrovac, the Main Staff of the Serbian Army of Krajina had a forward command post where General Mile Novaković was located; he did not have full authority in command and was subject to limitations imposed by others on his decision-making. On the fourth day of the Croatian Army’s attack, Serbian units were in a favorable tactical position relative to Croatian units, and it was possible to deliver a decisive counterattack, but this was not carried out for unknown reasons.

The attack by the Republic of Croatia on the southern parts of the Republic of Serbian Krajina occurred during the implementation of the Vance plan. Under the Vance Plan, the Republic of Serbian Krajina was placed under the protection of United Nations peacekeeping forces, i.e. UNPROFOR, and this was the third instance of aggression by the Republic of Croatia against a UN-protected area. During the attack, Croatian forces captured part of the Ravni Kotari, Zemunik Airfield, the Peruća dam and hydroelectric power plant, several peaks on Mount Velebit, and facilities at the Tulove Grede and Velika Bobija locations, as well as Novigrad.

Serbian forces were pushed back in the Zadar hinterland. The UN Security Council adopted Resolution 802. The Croatian Army did not withdraw from the achieved line of advance despite criticism from the international community. Operation Maslenica was initially regarded as a failed military operation, but even so it brought success to Croatia, while the RSK suffered another defeat and increased insecurity.

In the Croatian attack on the Ravne Kotare area, the settlements of Smoković, Islam Grčki, and Kašić suffered the most damage and were burned, followed by the mixed-population settlements of Murvica, Crno, Zemunik Gornji, Poljica, and Islam Latinski, which were partially burned. This attack was planned and carried out by Janko Bobetko, Ante Gotovina, Ante Roso, Mirko Norac, and Mladen Markač, and was approved by Franjo Tuđman. Many of the Croatian commanders involved were promoted to the rank of general either at that time or shortly thereafter.

One of the participants in these events was also a Kosovar Albanian Agim Çeku, who served in the Croatian Army as chief of artillery of the “Velebit” sector.

Intensive combat activities in Ravne Kotare lasted until the end of March 1993, and at a lower intensity until the end of the year.

== Counteroffensive ==
The primary objective was to halt the further advance of Croatian forces and to retake lost territory, but due to poor coordination of forces, most of the lost territory was not recovered. Many units of the 7th North Dalmatian Corps of the Army of Serbian Krajina (SVK) took part in the operation (with the 92nd Benkovac Motorized Brigade as the core of the corps), as well as elite units such as the Wolves of Vučjak, the Knindže, intervention battalions from Banija and Kordun, and a significant number of volunteers (Arkan’s Tigers, White Eagles, the Kosovo–Toplica Detachment, etc.).

The front line stretched from Novigrad to the villages of Suhovare and Zemunik Gornji, over a length of approximately 20 km. After its initial success, the Croatian Army attempted to break through and seize Zemunik Gornji, Smilčić, and Pridraga, but was prevented from doing so by the SVK. In the defense of the border, the SVK received significant assistance from members of the Serbian Volunteer Guard led by Željko Ražnatović, as well as members of the Army of Republika Srpska (VRS), particularly fighters of the Wolves of Vučjak unit and their commander Veljko Milanković, who was seriously wounded during Croatian artillery fire.

With the loss of the Maslenica Bridge and Zemunik Airport, the Krajina Serbs were left with very little room for political maneuvering. Despite this, the Government of the Republic of Serbian Krajina, headquartered in Knin, was prepared to enter negotiations with Zagreb in order to “fully normalize Serbo-Croatian relations.” During the counteroffensive, Serbian fighters managed to halt further Croatian advances along the entire 20 km front line and push the enemy back 3 to 5 km along the entire line, forcing the Croatian Army into a defensive posture instead of further advance. In this counterattack, the settlements of Pedići, Babci, Potkosa, and Goleš were liberated. Fighting during this operation was extremely fierce for both sides.

The Croatian Army was stopped in front of the village of Pridraga, thereby preserving the Karin Sea. The enemy was pushed back toward Novigrad, although Novigrad itself was not recaptured. Paljuv remained under Croatian control, while the village of Smilčić withstood the offensive. The Wolves of Vučjak launched an attack on Kašić on 1 February at 07:30, with the objective of liberating the village. Serbian forces encircled the village; 17 Croatian soldiers were killed in the battle, while the remaining hundred fled toward Islam Grčki. Serbian forces suffered only one fatality and several wounded.

The following day, the Wolves of Vučjak were ordered to withdraw from Kašić to be replaced by SVK units. During the exchange of positions, the Croatian Army seized the opportunity to attack again and regained control of the village. The SVK and the Wolves of Vučjak launched another attack on Kašić on 4 February, but were met with heavy Croatian artillery fire. During this action, Veljko Milanković was wounded and later succumbed to his injuries on 14 February 1993 in Belgrade. In the battle for Kašić, 36 members of the Croatian Army and 18 members of the SVK and the Wolves of Vučjak were killed, and Kašić ultimately remained under Croatian control.

Along the line of contact, Donje Biljane and Gornji Zemunik were defended, the village of Suhovare was captured, and the Mali Alan pass was returned to Serbian control. After fierce fighting between the HOS and the Knindže, the villages of Škabrnja and Prkos were recaptured by Serbian forces on 22 March. The Croatian Army suffered 12 fatalities in the battle for Škabrnja.

== Footnotes ==
=== Bibliography ===
- Ramet, Sabrina P. (2010). Central and Southeast European Politics Since 1989. Cambridge University Press. ISBN 9781139487504.
- A Political Chronology of Europe. Psychology Press. 2001. pp. 69–70. ISBN 978-1-85743-113-1.
