= Veljko Milanković =

Serbian war commander (1955–1993)

- Born: 5 January 1955; Prnjavor, PR Bosnia and Herzegovina, FPR Yugoslavia
- Died: 14 February 1993 (aged 38); Belgrade, Serbia, FR Yugoslavia
- Military career
- Allegiance: Republika Srpska; Republic of Serbian Krajina
- Branch: Army of Republika Srpska
- Service years: 1991–1993
- Rank: Second lieutenant Commander
- Nicknames: Komandant Veljko; Hajduk Veljko; The Wolf from Vučjak
- Units: Kninjas; Wolves of Vučjak
- Conflicts: Croatian War; 1991 Yugoslav campaign in Croatia; Battle of Jasenovac; Operation Hurricane-91; Operation Maslenica; Operation Steel '93 (DOW); Bosnian War; Operation Corridor
- Awards: Order of Miloš Obilić

Veljko Milanković (Serbian Cyrillic: Вељко Миланковић; 5 January 1955 – 14 February 1993) was a Bosnian Serb war commander during the Yugoslav Wars with the rank of second lieutenant.

In 2007, it was announced that Milanković would have a street named after him in Novi Sad. Non-governmental groups protested the decision.

== Early life ==
Born to a farming family in the village of Kremna, near Prnjavor, FPR Yugoslavia (modern day Republika Srpska, Bosnia and Herzegovina), Milanković helped his father in the fields, working alongside Bosniak Muslims. In 1980, he was allegedly reported multiple times for illegally cutting down and stealing wood, and was arrested by the police for these charges, but was later released. According to Nemanja Vasić, a wartime resident of Prnjavor, Milanković was "both a hero and a criminal. The people loved him, but they also feared him."

== Military service ==
Initially training under Dragan Vasiljković, Milanković gained a reputation as a disciplined soldier. He fought originally for the independence of Republika Srpska and joined the 1st Krajina Corps, but upon his promotion to second lieutenant, he was permitted to create a paramilitary group named the Wolves of Vučjak. He led them until his death in 1993; under his command, the Wolves saw action in Modriča, Derventa, Jasenovac, Pakrac, Okučani, Bosanska, and Kninska Krajina. During the wars in Croatia and Bosnia, he was accused of the abuse of civilians and minorities.

=== Operation Maslenica ===
During Operation Maslenica, Milanković led an assault with his Wolves unit against Croatian positions in northern Dalmatia. The goal of Milanković and his unit were to push out Croatians and protect Serbs in the region. In 1992, he was injured in the foot while fighting in the village of Smrtić, in western Slavonia. Though he had to wear a cast, he did not leave the battlefield due to his leading position in the Wolves of Vučjak. He later played a critical role in Operation Corridor which helped widen a strip of Serbian-claimed land.

== Death ==
On 4 February 1993, Milanković was seriously wounded in street-to-street combat in Donji Kašić during Operation Steel '93 when he was shot in the right side of his chest from Croatian artillery fire. He later died of his wounds on 14 February 1993 at the age of 38 while receiving treatment at the Military Medical Academy in Belgrade. Three days later, he was buried in his native village.

== See more ==
- Wolves of Vučjak
- Dragan Vasiljković
