= Pajčin =

Pajčin (Serbian Cyrillic: Пајчин) is a Serbian surname, a patronymic of Pajo, itself a diminutive of Pavle (Paul). A Pajčin family lives in Gubin, Bosnia and Herzegovina. It may refer to:

- Mirko Pajčin (born 1966), better known by his stage name Baja Mali Knindža, Bosnian Serb folk singer-songwriter
- Ksenija Pajčin (1977–2010), Serbian pop singer and dancer
- Lazo Pajčin (1972–2022), Bosnian Serb singer-songwriter and composer
