= Egon Scotland =

German journalist

- Born: 7 October 1948; Hagen, Allied-occupied Germany
- Died: 26 July 1991 (aged 42); Sisak, Croatia
- Occupation: Journalist

Egon Scotland (7 October 1948 – 26 July 1991) was a German journalist, who was killed while covering the Yugoslav Wars.

== Biography ==
Scotland was a reporter for the Sueddeutsche Zeitung. In 1991 he travelled to the breaking Yugoslavia to cover the Croatian War of Independence.

On 26 July 1991 he drove to Glina with RSH reporter Peter Wüst because they heard that some journalist had gone missing. In Glina their car, clearly labelled "press", was targeted by the troops led by Serb paramilitary commander Dragan Vasiljković (nicknamed Captain Dragan). Scotland was shot in the abdomen and died in a hospital in Sisak. Other civilians were murdered in the same ambush.

Scotland was married to Christiane Schlötzer, also a journalist. Shortly after his death his colleagues founded the Munich-based association Journalisten helfen Journalisten (Journalists help Journalists, Jhl). His death contributed also to the foundation of the German section of Reporters Without Borders in 1994.

In 2015 Dragan Vasiljkovic, a dual citizen of Serbia and Australia, was extradited from Perth to Croatia, where in 2017 he was found guilty of war crimes, including the death of Scotland, and sentenced to 15 years of jail. According to Balkan Insight he was the only person to be convicted for the death of a journalist in the Balkan wars.

== See also ==
- List of journalists killed in Europe
