= Battle of Jasenovac =

1991 battle in the Croatian War of Independence

- Part of the Croatian War of Independence
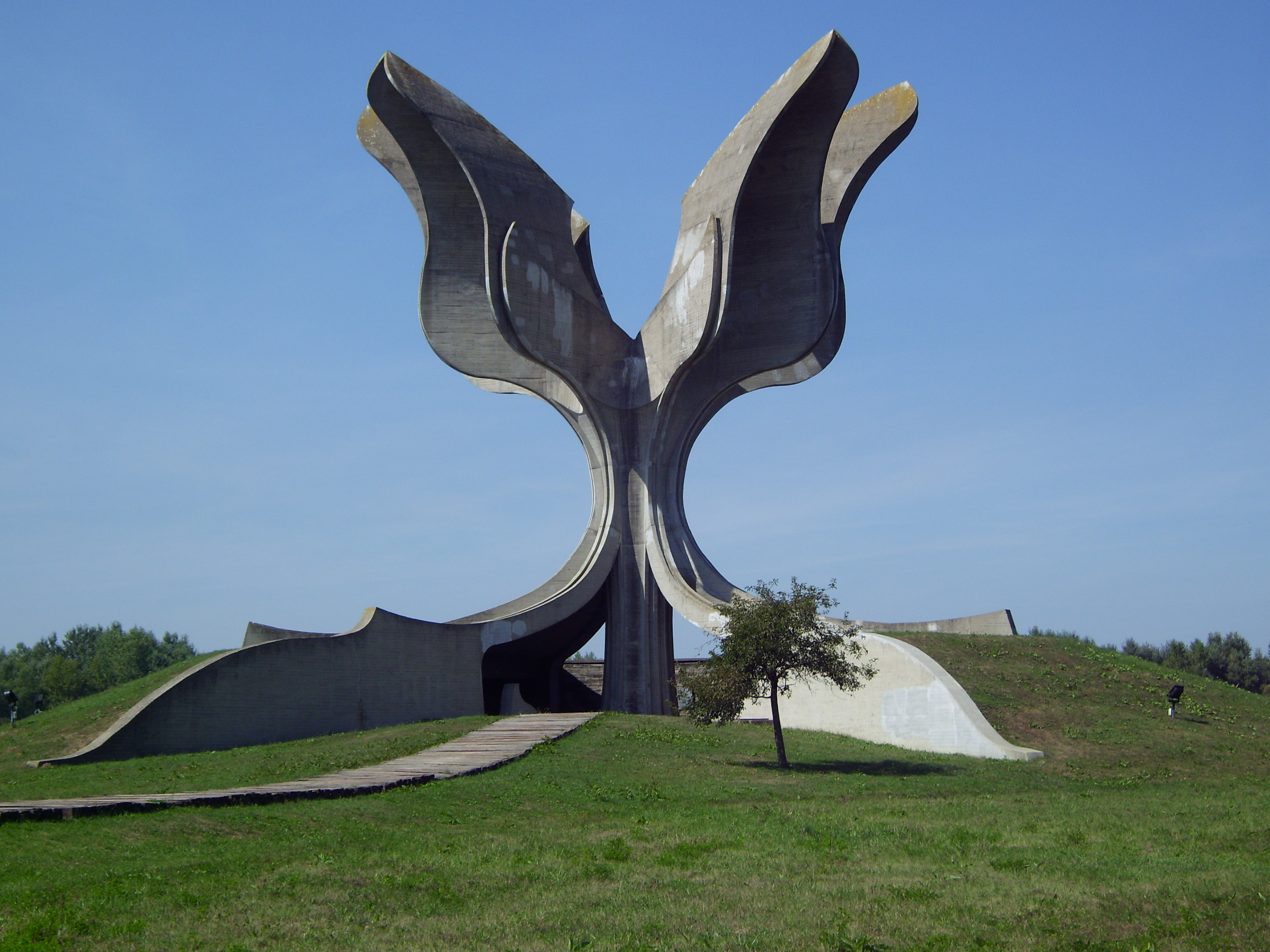
- Stone Flower in Jasenovac
Date	September 1991 – 8 October 1991
Location	Jasenovac, Croatia
Result	Yugoslav-SAO Krajina victory: Croatian forces withdraw; Crimes against the Croatian population of the village

Belligerents
SAO Krajina; Support by: Yugoslavia	Croatia

Commanders and leaders
Željko Ražnatović; Veljko Milanković	Anton Tus

Units involved
Yugoslav People's Army: Yugoslav Ground Forces; 5th Corps; Krajina Militia; Serb Volunteer Guard; Scorpions; Wolves of Vučjak	Croatian National Guard

Casualties and losses
None	10–50 Killed

The Battle of Jasenovac occurred during the Croatian War of Independence. In September 1991, Serb forces had taken the village of Jasenovac on 7 October, but on 8 October, the ZNG tried an unsuccessful counter-offensive.

During the Croatian Army's retreat, they shelled a bridge, causing some damage to the Serbs but Jasenovac remained in their hands. During the village's occupation, Croatian civilians were forced to flee, with many also getting killed.

== Battle ==
During World War II, Jasenovac was the site of a concentration camp operated by the fascist, Croatian nationalist Ustaše movement, in which primarily Serbs, Jews and Romani people, as well as anti-fascists, were interned. In mid-September 1991, Serb forces had various advances along the border with Bosnia and Herzegovina, attacking Croatian villages and towns, advancing further, and eventually arrived in Jasenovac. After some heavy fighting, the Serbian forces occupied the area and put up Serbian flags on the Stone Flower, a monument commemorating the concentration camp's victims. Afterwards, they expelled Croatian civilians, and also killed many, including those who supported the Croatian regime. In October, Croatian forces tried to re-take the village, starting an offensive. They had some success at the beginning, taking half of the village and advancing to the monument, but at the time the Scorpions and Serb Volunteer Guard paramilitaries had arrived, and their offensive kicked out the forces out of the area forcing them to retreat.

== Aftermath ==
During their withdrawal, Croatian forces shelled a bridge, causing some damage to the Serbs on a small scale. As fighting resumed, Croatians had to withdraw from the city and suffered some devastating losses. The number of the casualties vary from 10 to 50. The Serbian side purportedly had no casualties, since they kept retreating until the paramilitaries came, and Jasenovac was kept in hands of the Serbs until Operation Flash. By then, the village was unprotected and had almost no Croatian civilians inhabiting it, and those who were still in the area had their homes burned.

According to Croatian sources, the Jasenovac memorial site was devastated by the Serbian paramilitaries during their occupation of the village. Others state that it was damaged by Croatian forces in September 1991. Simo Brdar, assistant director of the Jasenovac Memorial Area, managed to transport some of the materials and documentations for preservation. In 1999, the artifacts were housed in Republika Srpska and then to the United States Holocaust Memorial Museum in 2000 before being returned to Croatia.
