= Kapisoda =

Kapisoda is a surname. Notable people with the surname include:

- Aleksandar Kapisoda (born 1989), Montenegrin footballer
- Filip Kapisoda (1987–2010), Montenegrin model and handball player
- Petar Kapisoda (born 1976), Montenegrin handball player
