= Zemunik Donji =

Croatian municipality

- Church of St. Catherine
- Interactive map of Zemunik Donji
- Location within Croatia
- Coordinates: 44°06′24.12″N 15°22′50.16″E
- Country: Croatia
- Region: Dalmatia
- County: Zadar County

Area
  - Total: 54.8 km^{2} (21.2 sq mi)

Population (2021)
  - Total: 2,159
  - Density: 39.4/km^{2} (102/sq mi)
- Time zone: UTC+1 (CET)
  - Summer (DST): UTC+2 (CEST)
- Website: zemunik.hr

Zemunik Donji is a municipality in the Zadar County in Croatia. According to the 2011 census, there were 2,060 inhabitants, 91% of whom were Croats. The municipality of Zemunik Donji is located in the Ravni Kotari region. The area of the municipality is 54.8 km^{2}, and it consists of the settlements Zemunik Donji, Zemunik Gornji and Smoković.

== Climate ==
Since records began in 1981, the highest temperature recorded at the local weather station in Zemunik was 40.0 °C (104.0 °F), on 5 August 2017. The coldest temperature was −12.0 °C (10.4 °F), on 28 February 2018.

== Demographics ==
In 2021, the municipality had 2,159 residents in the following settlements:

- Smoković, population 165
- Zemunik Donji, population 1557
- Zemunik Gornji, population 437
Municipality of Zemunik Donji: Population trends 1857–2021
v

population	1403	1434	1620	1742	2080	2355	2760	3135	4040	4649	4960	4535	4267	4657	1903	2060	2159
	1857	1869	1880	1890	1900	1910	1921	1931	1948	1953	1961	1971	1981	1991	2001	2011	2021

Sources: Croatian Bureau of Statistics publications

== Politics ==
=== Minority councils and representatives ===
Directly elected minority councils and representatives are tasked with consulting tasks for the local or regional authorities in which they are advocating for minority rights and interests, integration into public life and participation in the management of local affairs. At the 2023 Croatian national minorities councils and representatives elections Serbs of Croatia fulfilled legal requirements to elect 10 members minority councils of the Municipality of Zemunik Donji but the elections were not held due to the absence of candidatures.

== Bibliography ==
- Modrić, Oliver (2025-01-27). "Prijenos i zbrinjavanje gradiva župnih arhiva u Arhiv Zadarske nadbiskupije" [Transfer and storage of materials of the parish archives to the Archives of the Archdiocese of Zadar]. Vjesnik dalmatinskih arhiva (in Serbo-Croatian). 5: 109–124. doi:10.58565/vda.5.1.5. eISSN 2806-8459.
