= Murvica =

Murvica may refer to:

- Murvica, Split-Dalmatia County
- Murvica, Zadar County
