= Operation Maslenica =

Croatian Army offensive launched in January 1993

Coordinates: 44°14′12″N 15°31′22″E

- Part of the Croatian War of Independence
Date	22 January – 1 February 1993
Location	Maslenica, Croatia
Result	Croatian tactical victory: Croatian offensive halted due to Serbian counteroffensive

Belligerents
Croatia	Republic of Serbian Krajina

Commanders and leaders
(Croatia) Franjo Tudjman (Croatia) Janko Bobetko (Croatia) Ante Gotovina (Croatia) Ante Roso (Croatia) Mirko Norac (Croatia) Mladen Markač (Croatia) Mirko Šundov (Croatia) Miljenko Filipović (Croatia) Agim Çeku	(Republic of Serbian Krajina) Mile Novaković (Republic of Serbian Krajina) Veljko Milanković (Republic of Serbian Krajina) Kosta Novaković (Republic of Serbian Krajina) Milan Đilas (Republic of Serbian Krajina) Jovan Dopuđ (Republic of Serbian Krajina) Dragan Harambašić (Republic of Serbian Krajina) Dragan Tanjga (Republic of Serbian Krajina) Momčilo Bogunović †

Strength
10,000	8,500

Casualties and losses
114 killed	348 soldiers and civilians, including 35 women and 3 children (Serbian sources) 490 soldiers killed (Croatian sources)
- (Republic of Serbian Krajina) 10,000 Serbian civilians displaced

Operation Maslenica was a Croatian Army offensive launched in January 1993 to retake territory in northern Dalmatia and Lika from Krajina Serb forces, with the stated military objective of pushing the Serbs back from approaches to Zadar, Maslenica and Karlobag, allowing a secure land route between Dalmatia and northern Croatia to be opened. While an undoubted net Croatian tactical success, the operation was only a moderate strategic success, and was condemned by the UN Security Council.

== Origins ==
Maslenica on the map of Croatia, 1991/1992. Serbian-held territories are highlighted in red.

In early September, 1991, during the opening stages of the Croatian War of Independence, Serb-dominated units of the Knin Corps of the Yugoslav People's Army (JNA), under the command of Colonel Ratko Mladić and supported by the ethnic Serb Krajina militia, conducted offensive operations against areas under the Croatian government's control in Northwestern Dalmatia. Despite vigorous resistance, nascent, inexperienced and poorly armed units of the Croatian Army, police and local militias succumbed to superior force and had to abandon their positions, including the strategically important Maslenica area, the site of a key bridge connecting Dalmatia with the rest of Croatia.

Fighting continued in subsequent months, during which the JNA and Krajina Serbs managed to gradually expand territories under their control and even threaten the major urban centre of Zadar. The Maslenica bridge was blown up in November by the Serb forces.

In January, 1992, the Sarajevo armistice and the arrival of UNPROFOR solidified battle lines into the boundary between Croatian government control and the self-proclaimed RSK (Republic of Serb Krajina). Although this provided months of relative peace to citizens of Croatian-controlled Dalmatia, the situation proved to be untenable in the long term, because the region was severed from the rest of the country, despite nominally having a land link. The usual land routes through Bosnia, Lika and Dalmatia were controlled by the Serbs both in Croatia and Bosnia-Herzegovina. This forced traffic and commerce to use ferryboat services and the Pag Bridge connecting Pag island and mainland Dalmatia, which were often affected by bad weather. The Pag Bridge was also damaged by the JNA air force in 1991, causing doubts about its long-term use. Furthermore, the Serb army also controlled the Peruća hydroelectric dam near Sinj and threatened its destruction, which could have flooded the Cetina valley, leaving Dalmatia without power.

The fact that Dalmatia was severed from the rest of Croatia had an effect on Croatian internal politics. Since the Sarajevo armistice, the government of Franjo Tuđman was constantly criticised for using apparently ineffective diplomacy instead of direct military action to liberate the rest of the country. The Elections for the Croatian Chamber of Counties and various local and regional assemblies were scheduled for February 7, and many expected far-right opposition parties to use the issue to make gains against Tuđman's centre-right HDZ party.

== Opposing forces ==
In the year since the Sarajevo armistice, the Croatian military not only gained valuable experience and boosted their morale through successful offensive operations in neighboring Bosnia-Herzegovina, but also used the lack of major military operations on Croatian soil to improve its equipment, organisation, personnel and tactics. The core of the Croatian military were professional Guards brigades - three of which would ultimately see action in the subsequent battle.

The Republic of Serbian Krajina was, on the other hand, much weakened by the retreat of the JNA following the Croatian diplomatic recognition and the eruption of war in neighbouring Bosnia, which gobbled up much of the military, economic and other resources of Serbia proper and left the RSK forces more or less on their own. Their forces were additionally weakened by having to support Serb forces in Bosnia, especially Bosanska Posavina where the RSK elite Knindža unit suffered heavy casualties in 1992.

Despite Croatian forces conducting a minor offensive in the area of the Miljevci Plateau in June 1992, RSK leaders didn't believe Croatian military action to be imminent. The UNPROFOR presence and Croatia being involved in the Bosnian War, where the dispute with Bosnian Serbs had begun to lose importance compared with the emerging conflict between Bosnian Croats and the Bosnian Muslim government.

== Timeline ==
The Croatian Army and Special Police units started the offensive in the Maslenica and Zadar area on January 22. RSK forces were completely taken by surprise and initially failed to offer any meaningful resistance. One of the reasons for the initial Croatian success was the unprecedented use of Croatian naval and air forces - which was the only instance of Croatian ground, naval and air forces acting together in a single major operation.

As a result, Maslenica and areas around Zadar were liberated, and the Croatian Army continued to push into the hinterland of Northern Dalmatia. Janko Bobetko, the Croatian Army general in charge of the operation, was hailed as a national hero and the city of Zadar saw public celebrations.

Six days later, seeing RSK forces being overwhelmed, the 126th Home Guard Regiment of the Croatian Army near Sinj conducted its own offensive operation against the Peruča dam. The dam was taken, but not before RSK forces detonated explosives that left it damaged. The dam held long enough to prevent massive flooding, but not long enough to prevent a major loss of hydroelectric power that would plague Dalmatia for much of the next year. The 200-foot-high dam held back an estimated 17 billion cubic feet of water in a narrow lake that stretched for 12 miles. The collapse would have unleashed the water down the Cetina River valley, affecting 50,000 people.

In the meantime, the RSK forces reorganised, stormed arms depots held by UNPROFOR and began to resist advancing Croatian forces more effectively. The government in Belgrade failed to honour its promise of military intervention in the case of a major Croatian offensive against the Krajina, but the arrival of volunteers from Serbia proper, including units commanded by Arkan, improved RSK-morale to a certain extent. Those forces mounted a ferocious counter-attack which, although ultimately repulsed, resulted in many Croatian casualties and the Croatian advance lost its momentum.

Partly due to international pressure, partly because of the potential for huge casualties to affect the outcome of elections and partly because of the impression that the most immediate aims were met, the Croatian government decided to halt the offensive. The fighting continued in a series of local attacks and counterattacks, with minor pieces of territory changing hands and the Dalmatian coastal cities of Zadar, Biograd and Šibenik being occasionally shelled by Serb artillery. By the autumn of 1993, all those incidents petered out and both sides held the lines that would be unchanged until Operation Storm in August, 1995.

== Losses ==
According to Croatian sources, the only published military data so far, the Croatians had 114 fatalities and the Serbs suffered 490 dead.

The Serbian NGO Veritas cites a figure of 348 Serb soldiers and civilians killed during the operation. The villages Smoković, Kašić and Islam Grčki were burnt down by Croatian forces, and forced many of the civilians to flee. Another 165 civilians, mainly elderly, later died while fleeing.

The Croatian officials initially publicly claimed that the number of Croatian fatalities in the Operation Maslenica was 50. It was soon revealed that the correct numbers, found and verified by independent and unbiased sources, were much higher, which sparked a controversy in Croatia.

== Aftermath ==
Operation Maslenica is hailed as a major success by Croatian sources. These claim that the main objectives of the offensive were achieved on the first days. The Croatian army took over Maslenica, Islam Grčki, Zemunik airport and Zadar´s hinterland. They also secured Velika and Mala Bobija, Tulove Grede and Mali Alan in Velebit, a strategic area that allowed them to check Serbian forces in Benkovac, Obrovac and Gračac. Further advances were halted on 25 January under international pressure.

While the Croatian military inflicted a heavy blow on Krajina and retook a relatively large section of Croatian territory, it didn't remove the threat towards the Dalmatian cities completely. Even the stated aim of securely connecting Dalmatia to the rest of Croatia was not achieved. This became apparent with the opening of a pontoon bridge at Maslenica later in the year. The bridge was in range of RSK artillery, thus allowing RSK leader Milan Martić to publicly brag about his ability to sink it or close it to traffic at his leisure. Traffic over the bridge normalised only after UN-sponsored negotiations.

The Croatian Army's failure to properly exploit the initial success of the offensive is usually attributed to tactical mistakes in the latter stages of the operation and its lack of superior artillery - an issue that would be addressed in 1994 and 1995. By exposing these weaknesses, Operation Maslenica allowed Croatian military staff to remedy them and plan more ambitious and ultimately more successful offensives like Operation Flash and Operation Storm.

A new Maslenica Bridge was built in 1997-1998, on a slightly different location from the old bridge that had been destroyed. The renovation of the latter was completed in early 2006.

Twelve years after the operation, during the 2005 campaign for local elections in Croatia, these events sparked another controversy. On May 1, 2005, the 10th anniversary of Operation Flash, the Croatian prime minister Ivo Sanader used the celebrations to campaign for his HDZ party. The Croatian president, Stipe Mesić, reacted by expressing outrage over the use of Croatian military operations for party politics and claimed that Operation Maslenica had been executed solely as a Tuđman pre-election stunt, and had resulted in the needless waste of Croatian lives. This statement was almost immediately attacked by Croatian war veterans' organizations.

== See also ==
- Operation Steel '93
