= The Captain Dragan Foundation =

Non-governmental organization

Flag of the organization

The Captain Dragan Foundation is a humanitarian, non-profit, non-governmental, non-partisan organisation, organized in a citizens' association whose main goal is to provide legal and financial assistance to imprisoned Serbs, both in Serbia and throughout the diaspora.

== History ==
During the Yugoslav Wars, Dragan Vasiljković founded the "Captain Dragan Fund" with the aim of helping Serbian war victims.

On the 18th of September 2020, on the 29th anniversary of the founding of the Captain Dragan Fund, which eventually ceased to exist, the Foundation with the same name was established.

"I have to point out that 2.5 thousand of these were children who received certain help after the death of their fathers. We are now embarking on a major activity of the fund to help Serbs in prisons in Nazi casemates in the 21st century. The organization will also deal with social and civil protection and will provide legal assistance to all discriminated and convicted members of our people", said Vasiljković on the day of its establishment.
