= Battle of Hrvatska Kostajnica =

1991 battle of the Croatian War of Independence

- Part of the Croatian War of Independence
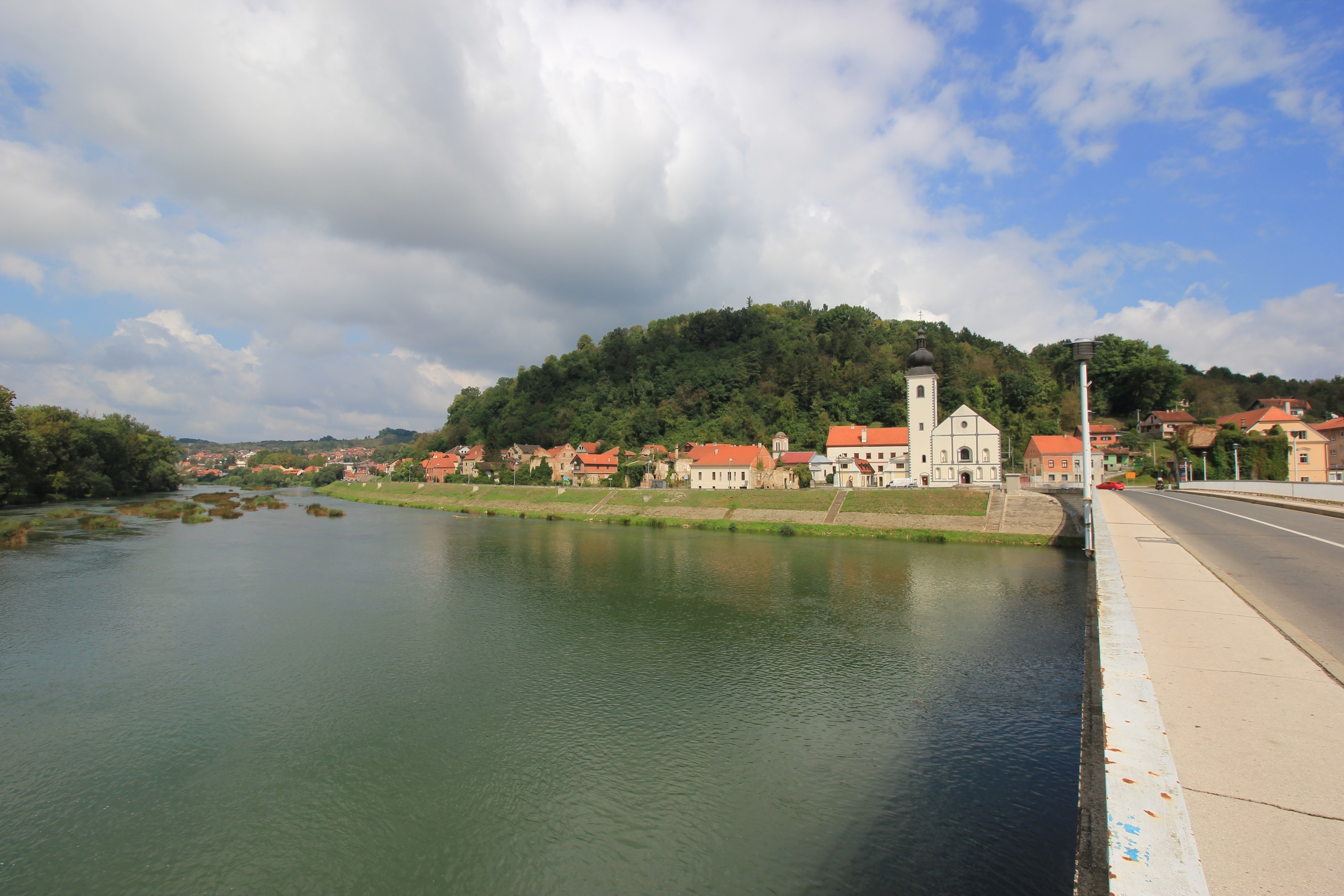
- A view of Hrvatska Kostajnica from a bridge crossing into Bosnia and Herzegovina.
Date	July – September 1991
Location	Hrvatska Kostajnica, Croatia
Result	SAO Krajina victory

Belligerents
Yugoslavia (Republic of Serbian Krajina) SAO Krajina	Croatia

Commanders and leaders
(Republic of Serbian Krajina) Milan Martić (Republic of Serbian Krajina) Branko Dmitrović (Republic of Serbian Krajina) Dragan Vasiljković	(Croatia) Zvonimir Kalan (surrendered) (Croatia) Nedjeljko Podunajec (surrendered) (Croatia) Janko Bobetko

Units involved
Yugoslav People's Army; Yugoslav Ground Forces; 7th Banija Division; Banija Territorial Defense; Special Units of the Serbian Krajina Militia; Kninjas	Croatian National Guard; 1/1st Guards Brigade; Elements of Zrinski Battalion; Croatian Police; Lučko Anti-Terrorist Unit

Strength
1,000–2,000	500–750

Casualties and losses
Unknown	Many killed, many surrendered

The Battle of Hrvatska Kostajnica (Croatian: Bitka za Hrvatsku Kostajnicu) was a military engagement fought between the proclaimed Croatian-Serb Serbian Autonomous Oblast of Krajina (SAO Krajina) supported by the Yugoslav People’s Army (Jugoslavenska Narodna Armija) and local Territorial Defense based in Bosanska Kostajnica, against the Croatian National Guard (ZNG) and Croatian policemen. Fought between July 17th, and ending with the capture of Kostajnica on September 13th, the desired result was mainly to kill Croatian President Franjo Tuđman, whom was inspecting Croatian National Guard personnel in Hrvatska Kostajnica.

The Yugoslav People’s Army and SAO Krajina forces captured Hrvatska Kostajnica on 13th September, Croatian National Guard and Croatian Policemen attempted a breakout to Hrvatska Dubica, most of them were killed in the process. In the aftermath, the vicinity of Kostajnica had been captured and looted by SAO Krajina forces. Most of the defenders had been sent to the Manjača concentration camp and a prison camp in Glina. Hrvatska Kostajnica would later be liberated by the Croatian Army during Operation Storm.

== Background ==
In 1990, ethnic tensions between Serbs and Croats worsened after the electoral defeat of the government of the Socialist Republic of Croatia by the Croatian Democratic Union (Croatian: Hrvatska demokratska zajednica – HDZ). The Yugoslav People's Army (Serbian: Jugoslovenska Narodna Armija – JNA) confiscated Croatia's Territorial Defence (Croatian: Teritorijalna obrana – TO) weapons to minimize resistance. On 17 August, the tensions escalated into an open revolt of the Croatian Serbs, centred on the predominantly Serb-populated areas of the Dalmatian hinterland around Knin (approximately 60 kilometres (37 miles) north-east of Split), parts of the Lika, Kordun, Banovina and eastern Croatia. In January 1991, Serbia, supported by Montenegro and Serbia's provinces of Vojvodina and Kosovo, unsuccessfully tried to obtain the Yugoslav Presidency's approval for a JNA operation to disarm Croatian security forces. The request was denied and a bloodless skirmish between Serb insurgents and Croatian special police in March prompted the JNA itself to ask the federal president to give it wartime authority and declare a state of emergency. Even though the request was backed by Serbia and its allies, the JNA request was refused on 15 March. Serbian President Slobodan Milošević preferred a campaign to expand Serbia rather than to preserve Yugoslavia with Croatia as a federal unit, publicly threatened to replace the JNA with a Serbian army and declared that he no longer recognized the authority of the federal presidency. The threat caused the JNA to abandon plans to preserve Yugoslavia in favour of expansion of Serbia as the JNA came under Milošević's control. By the end of March, the conflict had escalated with the first fatalities. In early April, leaders of the Serb revolt in Croatia declared their intention to amalgamate the areas under their control with Serbia. These were viewed by the Government of Croatia as breakaway regions.

At the beginning of 1991, Croatia had no regular army. To bolster its defence, Croatia doubled its police numbers to about 20,000. The most effective part of the Croatian police force was 3,000-strong special police comprising twelve battalions organised along military lines. There were also 9,000–10,000 regionally organised reserve police in 16 battalions and 10 companies, but they lacked weapons. In response to the deteriorating situation, the Croatian government established the Croatian National Guard (Croatian: Zbor narodne garde – ZNG) in May by expanding the special police battalions into four all-professional guards brigades. Under Ministry of Defence control and commanded by retired JNA General Martin Špegelj, the four guards brigades comprised approximately 8,000 troops. The reserve police, also expanded to 40,000, was attached to the ZNG and reorganised into 19 brigades and 14 independent battalions. The guards brigades were the only units of the ZNG that were fully equipped with small arms; throughout the ZNG there was a lack of heavier weapons and there was poor command and control structure above the brigade level. The shortage of heavy weapons was so severe that the ZNG resorted to using World War II weapons taken from museums and film studios. At the time, the Croatian weapon stockpile consisted of 30,000 small arms purchased abroad and 15,000 previously owned by the police. To replace the personnel lost to the guards brigades, a new 10,000-strong special police was established.

== Prelude ==
After tensions escalated between Croatian-Serbs and Croats in the Banovina region, the situation then further escalated when the Croatian War of Independence began, the Yugoslav People’s Army and SAO Krajina forces attacked Hrvatska Kostajnica and the Dvor area, before that the Croatian Police and Croatian National Guard organized defenses in these towns. After the capture of Banovina, the Croatian National Guard and Interior Ministry tried desperately to turn the situation to their favor. They attempted to negotiate with YPA and SAO Krajina forces and made an effort to strengthen their defenses via the establishment of police battalions.

A plan conducted by the 7th Banija Corps and “Kninjas” paramilitary unit, and the SAO Krajina Territorial Defense named Operation Stinger with the goal to eliminate the Croatian Interior Ministry (along with police) and Croatian National Guard presence. It also aimed to stiffen the latter in Glina and the surrounding areas. as part of the wider campaign in the area, Hrvatska Kostajnica, would be attacked, along with Glina which is where heavy fighting occurred when Serbs spearheaded a large attack there. After Glina and other police stations fell, the Croatian National Guard had temporarily left Hrvatska Kostajnica. They came back when the Serbs initiated the 2nd Phase of the operation. The Serbs mainly focused on Hrvatska Kostajnica when it had been apparent that Franjo Tuđman was there inspecting Croatian Army personnel.

== Battle ==
The Yugoslav People’s Army began their invasion of SAO Western Slavonia. Tanks and artillery were seen from across the Una. Intense artillery affected Hrvatska Kostajnica and the surrounding areas. the Yugoslav People's Army and SAO Krajina personnel, along with Territorial Defense in Bosnian Kostajnica had gradually been eroding the defenses of Hrvatska Kostajnica for about a month, during this time the YPA (Yugoslav People's Army) and SAO Krajina forces had been cutting of Hrvatska Kostajnica from Hrvatska Dubica, and capturing surrounding towns to completely surround Kostajnica. Croatian forces withdrew from Hrvatska Kostajnica briefly, re-entering the town on August 2nd. The 7th Banija Division committed to occupying Hrvatska Kostajnica, with 1,000–2,000 troops. They outnumbered the Croatian garrison of only 400–450 defenders. The 7th Banija Division then cut off the road to Hrvatska Dubica, which is where the Croatian garrison stationed in Hrvatska Kostajnica got most of their supplies from. The road was captured by Serb forces, but was reportedly re-occupied by the Lučko Anti-Terrorist Unit and the 120th ZNG Brigade. The rest of the fighting devolved into an unsuccessful Croatian counter-attack to relieve the besieged town of Hrvatska Kostajnica. The Serbs besieging the town began to push for a final attack, to break the stalemate and occupy Hrvatska Kostajnica. This push came on August 30, Serbian forces captured the hill of Djed, that overlooked the town and was vital position. On the early morning of September 12th, Serbian forces captured 60 Croatian policemen, who were then brutally tortured, this was done to physiologically affect the Croatian defenders. The situation then completely collapsed as a failed Croatian offensive to break out of the siege and reach Hrvatska Dubica. The elite Knin police "Kninjas" (Serbian Cyrillic: (Knindže) arrived and broke-through the defenses of the town. They then forced the Croats into a section of the town near the Una (Sava). The Croatian defenders then surrendered and were sent to the Manjača camp where they were mistreated and executed.

During the fighting in Kostajnica, three journalists were killed by Serb forces. Croatian photographer and Croatian Radiotelevision cameraman, Gordan Lederer, was killed on 10 August 1991 in Kostajnica, by Serb sniper fire.

On 1 September 1991, two Russian journalists working for the All-Russia State Television and Radio Broadcasting Company, Viktor Nogin and Gennadiy Kurinnoy, were shot and killed by Serb rebel forces in their car.

== Aftermath ==
The attacks on Hrvatska Kostajnica were a major success for the cause for Republic of Serbian Krajina, with 60 Croatian Policemen captured, and many capable and sufficient soldiers from the Zrinski Battalion and the 1st Guards Brigade (Croatia) were captured or killed.

=== Further advances ===
After Hrvatska Kostajnica was captured on September 13th, SAO Krajina forces captured Hrvatska Dubica. A day later fell Topusko on September 14th.

=== War crimes ===
After the strategic hill of Djed was captured, SAO Krajina forces captured 60 Croatian policemen, who were then tortured. After the Kninjas pushed the remaining Croatian soldiers into a section of the town that was near a bridge that led to the city of Kostajnica, Bosnia and Herzegovina, the Croatian garrison stationed at Hrvatska Kostajnica surrendered and were sent to the Manjača concentration camp where they would be tortured and a number killed. Following the capture of the town, killings began as SAO Krajina forces torched and looted Hrvatska Kostajnica, and nearby villages.

== Sources ==
- Central Intelligence Agency, Office of Russian and European Analysis (2002). Balkan Battlegrounds: A Military History of the Yugoslav Conflict, 1990–1995. Washington, D.C.: Central Intelligence Agency. ISBN 9780160664724. OCLC 50396958.
- Eastern Europe and the Commonwealth of Independent States. London, England: Routledge. 1999. ISBN 978-1-85743-058-5.
- Engelberg, Stephen (3 March 1991). "Belgrade Sends Troops to Croatia Town". The New York Times. Archived from the original on 2 October 2013.
- Hoare, Marko Attila (2010). "The War of Yugoslav Succession". In Ramet, Sabrina P. (ed.). Central and Southeast European Politics Since 1989. Cambridge: Cambridge University Press. ISBN 978-1-139-48750-4.
- Ramet, Sabrina P. (2006). The Three Yugoslavias: State-Building And Legitimation, 1918–2006. Bloomington, Indiana: Indiana University Press. ISBN 978-0-253-34656-8.
- Sudetic, Chuck (2 April 1991). "Rebel Serbs Complicate Rift on Yugoslav Unity". The New York Times. Archived from the original on 2 October 2013.
- "The Prosecutor vs. Milan Martic – Judgement" (PDF). International Criminal Tribunal for the former Yugoslavia. 12 June 2007.
- "Roads Sealed as Yugoslav Unrest Mounts". The New York Times. Reuters. 19 August 1990. Archived from the original on 21 September 2013.
