= Ksenija Pajčin =

Serbian singer, dancer and model (1977–2010)

Ksenija Pajčin Ксенија Пајчин

Background information
- Also known as: Xenia; Ksenia
- Born: 3 December 1977; Belgrade, SR Serbia, Yugoslavia
- Died: 16 March 2010 (aged 32) Voždovac, Belgrade, Serbia
- Genres: Pop; dance
- Occupations: singer; model; dancer
- Years active: 1996–2010
- Label: City

Ksenija Pajčin (Serbian Cyrillic: Ксенија Пајчин, 3 December 1977 – 16 March 2010) was a Serbian singer, dancer and model popular in Serbia and the other former Yugoslav republics. Sometimes referred to as Xenia or Ksenia.

== Biography ==
=== Early life ===
Pajčin was born in Belgrade to mother Ljubica and father Miloš. Her family originates from the Bosnian village of Gubin near Livno. She was the cousin of controversial nationalist Bosnian Serb singer Baja Mali Knindža. Nine months after her death, Knindža released the song "Spavaj, kraljice" (Sleep, Queen) in her memory.

=== Music career ===
Pajčin started her career as a go-go dancer in discothèques. She appeared as a backup dancer in the music video for Dragana Mirkovic's song Opojni su zumbuli in 1994. During this time, she worked as an assistant to music mogul Minimaks, who had been the manager of such successful stars as Silvana Armenulić and Lepa Brena. She was offered the opportunity to join a pop duet, Duck, as a female vocal. Marija Mihajlović actually sang for their debut album, while Pajčin only lip synced.

As a dancer, she became famous in Greece, where she performed in numerous night clubs. Pajčin later went on to have a solo music career, and while her vocals were not impressive, she garnered attention for her dancing and outfits. She owned a dance studio in Belgrade and worked as a model. She frequently appeared in tabloids and was known for her outrageous statements. She openly discussed her sex life and plastic surgery.

One of her final musical releases was a duet with her friend Danijel Alibabić. The song entitled "Supica" was released in July 2009. The music video was filmed a few months later and was released on 9 January 2010, two months before Pajčin's death. Alibabić later wrote a song called "Pjesma za Kseniju" (Song For Ksenija) and released it in 2011 as a tribute.

=== Death and aftermath ===
Ksenija and her boyfriend of nearly two years Filip Kapisoda were seriously injured and nearly died in a car accident on 28 January 2010, just 47 days before they died in a murder–suicide. On 16 March 2010, the bodies of the 32-year-old singer and her boyfriend were found in her apartment in the Belgrade neighborhood of Voždovac. Both had gunshot wounds to the head. Police suspected a murder–suicide, with Kapisoda as the shooter. Police were called to the house several nights earlier as the couple were reported by neighbors because Kapisoda had broken into Pajčin's apartment, knocking down the door.

Early investigation reports stated that the dead bodies were discovered by the singer's mother, and that the gun used in the homicide was found next to Kapisoda's body. It is believed that the motive for the murder–suicide was jealousy. Bojana Ranković, the main investigator for the murder of Pajčin, said that she was warned through a text message that Kapisoda would kill her. In addition, the pistol used by Kapisoda was not his own, leading investigators to believe that someone else may have been involved.

Pajčin was buried in a white coffin on 20 March 2010 in the cemetery Novo groblje in Belgrade, the day after Filip's funeral (which was attended by their mutual friend, singer Goga Sekulić). Her funeral was attended by Goca Tržan, Mira Škorić, Romana Panić, Ana Nikolić, Neda Ukraden, Bora Drljača, Indira Radić, Danijel Alibabić, Darko Kostić, Vanesa Šokčić, Saša Dragić, Marina Tucaković, and Nada Topčagić, among others.

Her grave has been desecrated three times since the burial. The first time was in April 2012 and again in November that same year by an unknown person. The picture on her tombstone was broken, evidently by a hammer. The grave was vandalized a third time in February 2013, when an unknown person again broke the picture on her headstone, scattered the flowers that had been placed at her grave and broke the candle holders next to her grave.

== Discography ==
=== Studio albums ===
- Too hot to handle (1997)
- Extreme (2001)
- Sigurna (2004)

=== Compilations ===
- Best of Xenia (2006)

=== Non-album singles ===
1. Divan dan (1998)
2. Plačem danima (2002)
3. Dečko mi je umoran (2006)
4. Nino (2006)
5. Why did you tell me that you love me feat. Shella da Blasian (2006)
6. Seks bombastik feat. Todor (2007)
7. Veštica (2007)
8. Pizza (2008)
9. Hajde, sestro feat. Indira Radić (2008)
10. Farsa (2009)
11. Brka (2009)
12. Supica feat. Danijel Alibabić (2009)
13. Požuri feat. MC Stojan (2009)
