= Poličnik =

- Municipality
- Interactive map of Poličnik
- Location of Poličnik in Croatia
- Coordinates: 44°11′N 15°23′E
- Country: Croatia
- Region: Dalmatia
- County: Zadar County

Area
  - Municipality: 81.7 km^{2} (31.5 sq mi)
  - Urban: 16.4 km^{2} (6.3 sq mi)

Population (2021)
  - Municipality: 4,676
  - Density: 57.2/km^{2} (148/sq mi)
  - Urban: 1,023
  - Urban density: 62.4/km^{2} (162/sq mi)
- Website: opcina-policnik.hr

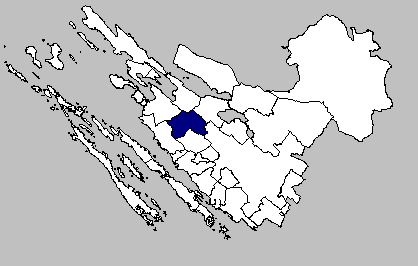
the Poličnik municipality within the Zadar County

Poličnik is a village and a municipality within Zadar County in Croatia. Poličnik is located 16 kilometers (9.9 mi) northeast of Zadar.

== Demographics ==
In the 2011 census, there were a total of 4,669 inhabitants, in the following settlements:

- Briševo, population 657
- Dračevac Ninski, population 280
- Gornji Poličnik, population 140
- Lovinac, population 278
- Murvica, population 701
- Murvica Gornja, population 253
- Poličnik, population 1,035
- Rupalj, population 245
- Suhovare, population 508
- Visočane, population 372

In the same census, 98.75% of the population were Croats.

Poličnik: Population trends 1857–2021
v

population	1677	1958	1952	2157	2251	2620	3312	3223	4334	4729	5158	5528	5144	6266	4664	4469	4676
	1857	1869	1880	1890	1900	1910	1921	1931	1948	1953	1961	1971	1981	1991	2001	2011	2021

Sources: Croatian Bureau of Statistics publications

== Bibliography ==
- Modrić, Oliver (2025-01-27). "Prijenos i zbrinjavanje gradiva župnih arhiva u Arhiv Zadarske nadbiskupije" [Transfer and storage of materials of the parish archives to the Archives of the Archdiocese of Zadar]. Vjesnik dalmatinskih arhiva (in Serbo-Croatian). 5: 109–124. doi:10.58565/vda.5.1.5. eISSN 2806-8459.
