= Novigrad, Zadar County =

Novigrad
- Municipality
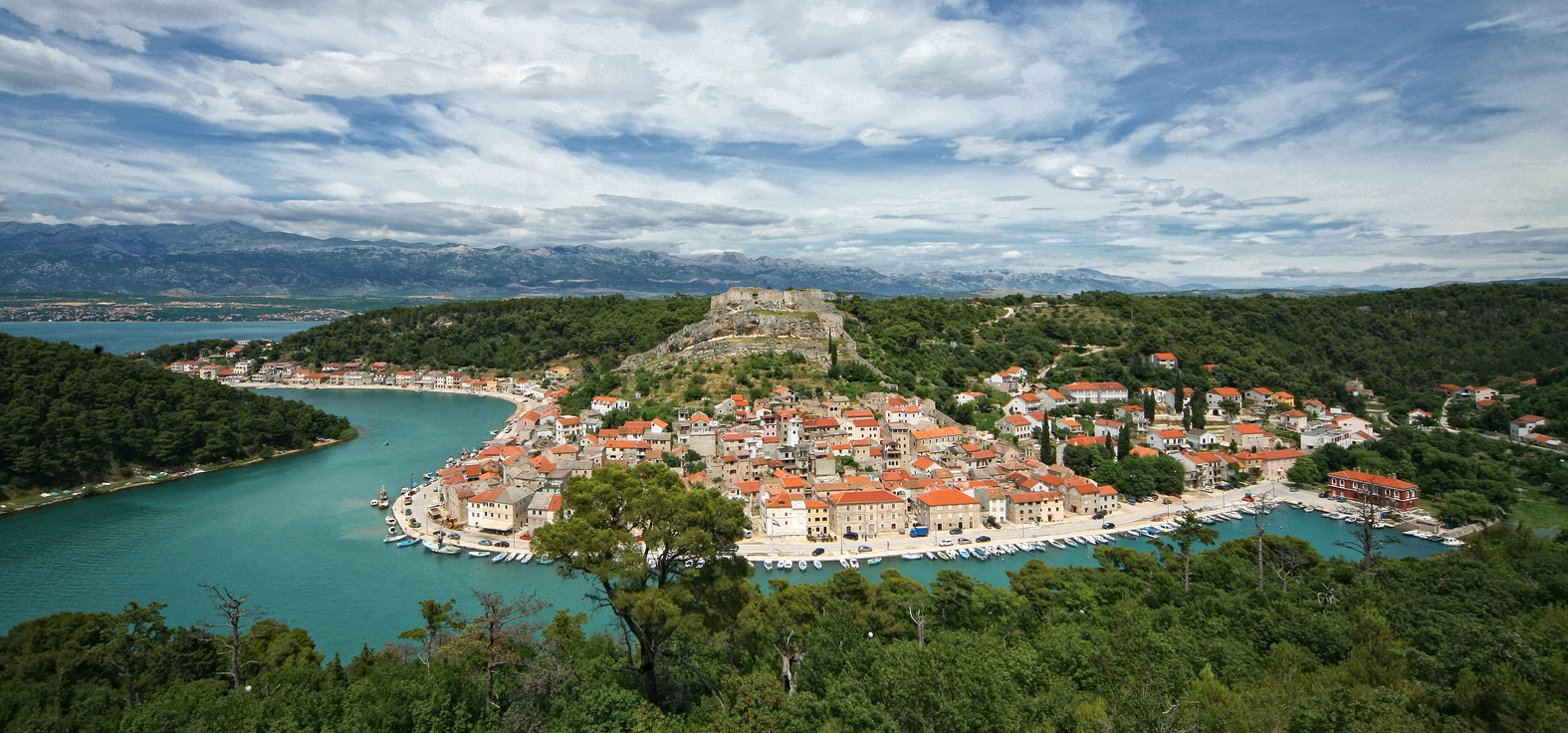

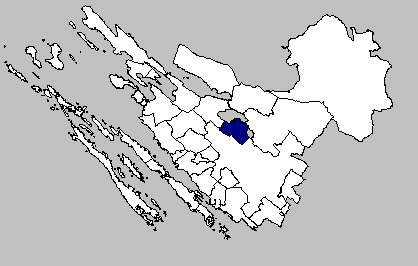
- Location of Novigrad in Zadar County
- Interactive map of Novigrad
- Location within Croatia
- Coordinates: 44°10′52″N 15°32′52″E
- Country: Croatia
- Region: Dalmatia
- County: Zadar County

Government
  - Municipal mayor: Joso Klapan

Area
  - Municipality: 51.2 km^{2} (19.8 sq mi)
  - Urban: 9.8 km^{2} (3.8 sq mi)

Population (2021)
  - Municipality: 2,160
  - Density: 42.2/km^{2} (109/sq mi)
  - Urban: 481
  - Urban density: 49/km^{2} (130/sq mi)
- Time zone: UTC+1 (CET)
  - Summer (DST): UTC+2 (CEST)
- Postal code: 23312 Novigrad
- Website: www.opcina-novigrad.hr

Novigrad is a village and municipality in Croatia in the Zadar County. According to the 2011 census, there were 2,375 inhabitants, absolute majority of whom were Croats.

== History ==
In 1386, the Hungarian and Croatian sovereign Mary and her mother, Elizabeth of Bosnia, were imprisoned in Novigrad. Elizabeth was strangled in Novigrad in 1387 but Mary was liberated. It was part of Republic of Venice in 1409. Venetian rule in Novigrad briefly interrupted by Ottoman occupation between 1646 and 1647 during Cretan War.

== Climate ==
Since records began in 1981, the highest temperature recorded at the local weather station was 40.4 °C (104.7 °F), on 22 July 2017. The coldest temperature was −10.0 °C (14.0 °F), on 9 January 1987.

== Demographics ==
In 2021, the municipality had 2,160 residents in the following settlements:

- Novigrad, population 481
- Paljuv, population 333
- Pridraga, population 1,346
Novigrad: Population trends 1857–2021
v

population	1405	1400	1728	1764	1979	2322	2570	2577	3029	3139	3260	3417	3103	2920	2368	2375	2160
	1857	1869	1880	1890	1900	1910	1921	1931	1948	1953	1961	1971	1981	1991	2001	2011	2021

Sources: Croatian Bureau of Statistics publications

== Attractions ==
The historic little town on the southern side of the Novigrad sea is situated in a narrow bay. The Novigrad sea is abundant in fish and shellfish, which is why Novigrad fishermen are well known. The town has preserved its Mediterranean architecture, and partially also its system of fortification. The vicinity of the Zrmanja River allows for attractive canoe, kayak or rafting excursions.

Vlatković (Kontin's) palace is an immovable cultural heritage complex located within the historic center of Novigrad, just above the Great (city) gate along the eastern rampart. The yard is a set of residential and commercial buildings with a water cistern and terraced gardens. It was extended several times in the period from the 17th to the 19th century. The last extensive reconstruction of the complex was carried out in 1813, when Canon Pave Vlatković built a cistern and decorated the residential buildings in the style of classicism.

== Gallery ==
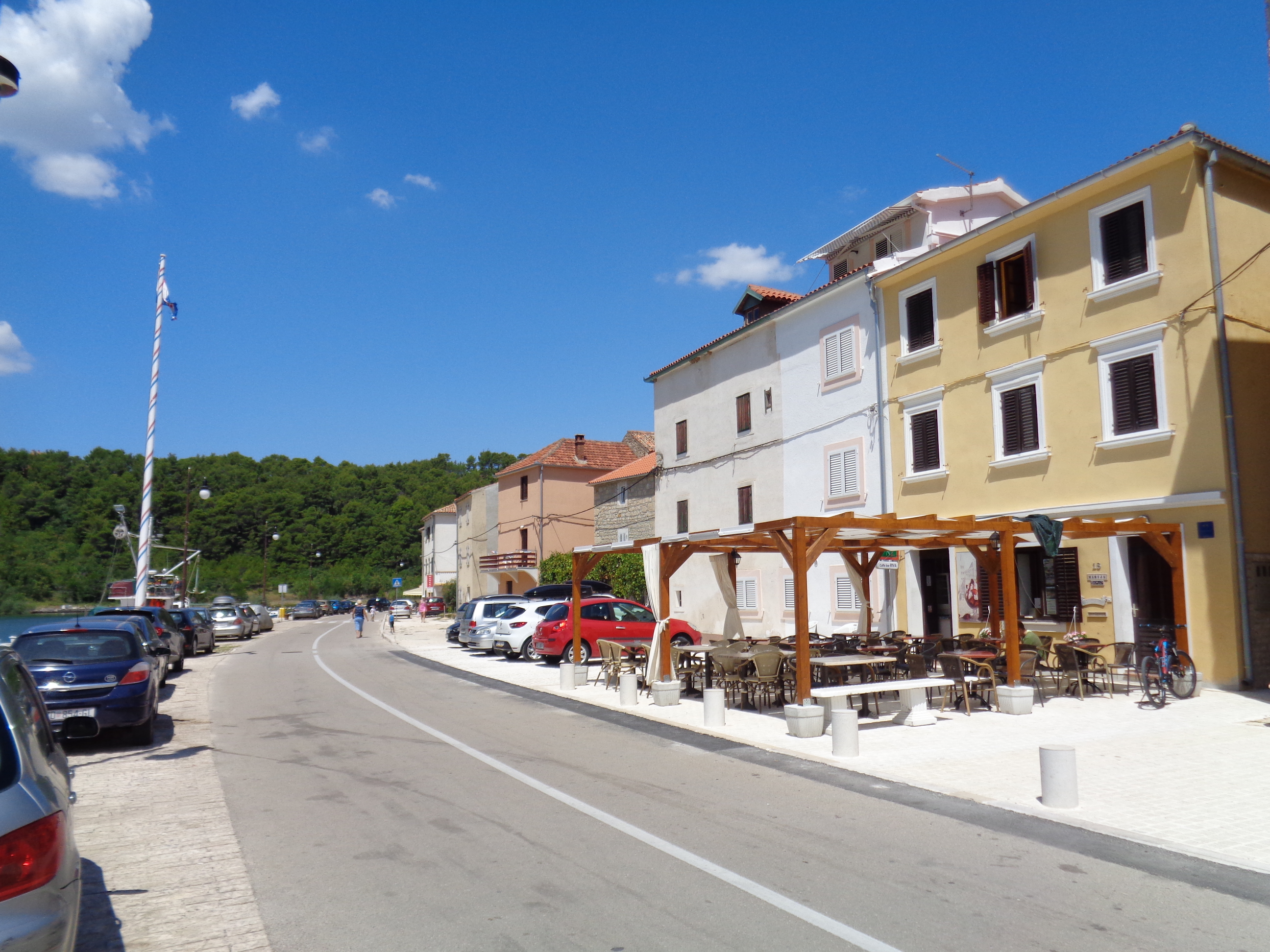
Main street

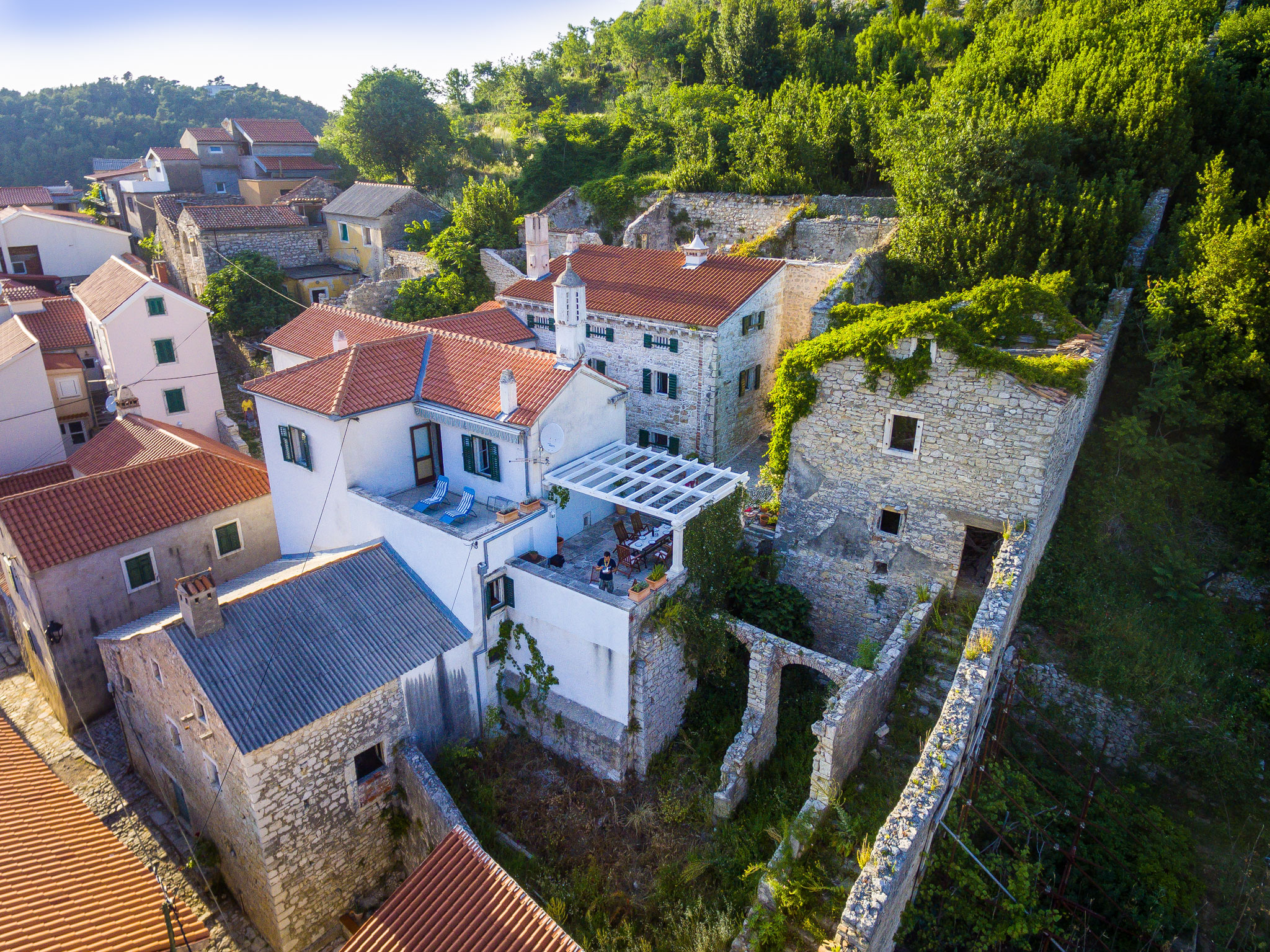
Vlatković palace
