= Baja Mali Knindža =

Bosnian Serb singer-songwriter (born 1966)

- Баја Мали Книнџа
- Born: Mirko Pajčin; 13 October 1966 (age 60); Gubin, SR Bosnia and Herzegovina, SFR Yugoslavia
- Occupation: singer-songwriter
- Years active: 1989–present
- Height: 1.76 m (5 ft 9 in)
- Children: 6
- Relatives: Ksenija Pajčin (cousin); Lazo Pajčin (cousin)
- Honours: Order of Njegoš, First Class
- Musical career
- Genres: Disco; Pop-folk; Turbo-folk
- Instrument: vocals
- Labels: Jugodisk; Nina Trejd; SuperTon; Renome; Lazarević Produktion; BN Music

Mirko Pajčin (Serbian Cyrillic: Мирко Пајчин; born 13 October 1966), better known by his stage name Baja Mali Knindža (Serbian Cyrillic: Баја Мали Книнџа, lit. 'Baja [the] Little Kninja'), is a Bosnian Serb folk singer-songwriter. He is often described as part of the turbo-folk scene and is well known for his pro-Serbian nationalist and pro-Chetnik songs.

== Early life ==
Mirko Pajčin was born on 13 October 1966 to Bosnian Serb parents Neđeljko and Maša in the village of Gubin, near Livno, SR Bosnia and Herzegovina. He was raised by his grandmother, a widow to his grandfather, also named Mirko, whilst his father worked in Germany and Austria. In 1972, he had issues in his right kidney, which eventually had to be removed; according to Pajčin, his life was "practically saved" by a "famous Jewish doctor" in Sarajevo.

He gained a passion for reading Russian literature whilst attending primary school; he also took an interest in languages and poetry in his schooling, the latter being something he continued to enjoy writing during his adult life.

Pajčin moved to Belgrade in 1980, and studied there in 1981. In 1984, he began singing in the Belgradian municipality of Surčin.

== Name ==
Pajčin was initially nicknamed Baja by his grandfather in his childhood. One of his grandmothers, who lived in Knin, also called him mali Knindža (Serbian Cyrillic: мали Книнџа, lit. 'little Kninja'), in reference to his small stature at the time and the Serb paramilitary unit known as the Kninjas. He combined the two nicknames on the advice of his manager at the start of his career..

== Career ==
Pajčin won a 1989 competition for amateur singers in Livno and released his first album in 1991. His career began just as Yugoslavia began to break up. Throughout the 1990s, he was known for his strong Serbian nationalism and Serbian nationalist songs during the Yugoslav Wars.

His first professional success was the song "Vrati se vojvodo" ("Come Back, Voivode"), in which he appealed to Chetnik commander Momčilo Đujić to come back to the areas of the Republic of Serbian Krajina and help lift the spirits of the Croatian Serbs. He said that he would never consider going to Croatia as he claimed that Croat soldiers "burned down his house and desecrated his ancestors' graves".

His most popular albums were Stan'te paše i Ustaše (Stand Back, Pashas and Ustašas) and Živeće ovaj narod (This Nation Will Live on), the latter selling 700,000 copies.

Pajčin performs at Kočić's Assembly in Zmijanje near Banja Luka in mid-August every year, typically attracting tens of thousands of people. Since Operation Storm, Pajčin has written many songs about his dream of the Serbs returning to live in territories now inhabited by Croats following the Croatian War of Independence. The songs "Posle oluje" ("After the Storm") and "4. Avgust" ("4 August") detail the aftermath of Operation Storm in 1995.

=== Controversies ===
Pajčin is controversial due to his Serbian nationalism and anti-Croat and anti-Bosniak sentiments in his song lyrics. Many of his songs are condemned in non-Serb parts of Bosnia and Croatia because of their lyrics, which often reference war leaders during the Yugoslav Wars, even being banned from performing in Croatia, the Federation of Bosnia and Herzegovina, and Switzerland due to his nationalist music. For example, his song "Ne volim te Alija" describes his intense dislike for Bosnian wartime president Alija Izetbegović, and the song "Tata" from the 1993 album Rat i mir includes the provocative line "My dad is a war criminal". One song titled "Ćuti, ćuti ujko" (featuring Serbian rock singer Bora Đorđević) contains the lyrics "Shut up, shut up, Ujko, I will kill you" as well as "Shut up, shut up, Mujo, I will kill you". He has also sung "Ja ne volim ljude te", which contains a derogatory reference to the Croatian checkerboard".

He has been criticised for performing concerts at gatherings of the Serbian Progressive Party.

== Musical style and lyrics ==
Pajčin's music is usually described as novokomponovana narodna muzika (lit. 'newly composed national music') and turbo-folk. His songs typically follow a ABAB rhyme scheme.

Early on in his career, Pajčin's albums focused on the nationalistic and chauvinistic themes of protecting Serbdom, Eastern Orthodoxy and Croatian Serbs, protecting them from "Ustaše" and Bosnian Muslims. After the signing of the Dayton Accords, his music would switch in focus to non-war topics, ranging from gambling to love to alcohol. In the late 2010s and 2020s, Pajčin's singles would again shift to patriotic themes, such as in the songs "Srpska Atina" ("Serbian Athens", 2020), "Volim svoju zemlju" ("I Love My Country", 2020), and "Republiko Srpska" ("Republic of Srpska", 2024).

== Personal life ==
=== Family ===
Pajčin has six children: three daughters, Smiljana, Ljiljana, and Anđela, and one son, Nenad, conceived with his first wife, Merlina, and two twin boys with his second wife, Dijana, whom he entered a relationship with in 2014 and married in 2017. He lives in Zemun with his second wife and two twin sons, Gavrilo and Danilo. His parents live in Surčin.

His cousin Ksenija Pajčin, a pop-folk recording artist, was murdered by her ex-boyfriend on 16 March 2010. Later that same year, Pajčin released the song "Spavaj, kraljice" ("Sleep, Queen") in her memory, stating that he was very "shaken" by her death. He is also the cousin of Lazo Pajčin, a fellow singer-songwriter and composer.

=== Religion ===
Pajčin is a Serbian Orthodox Christian, and has made numerous references to his faith and God in his songs, such as "Božić je" ("It's Christmas"), "Obilić me zove" ("Obilić Is Calling Me"), and "Pravoslavac" ("Orthodox Christian"). He has sung the ethnophyletist phrase "God is a Serb" in two songs: "Živeće ovaj narod" ("This Nation Will Live on") and "Neće biti granica na Drini" ("There Will Be No Border on the Drina").

=== Politics ===
During the 1990s, Pajčin supported the Serbian Radical Party (SRS) and even sang at the party's conventions. He also released an album in 1998 titled Srpskim radikalima (To the Serbian Radicals), which glorifies the party and its leader, Vojislav Šešelj. In 2004, he described himself as apolitical, yet also described his favourite politicians as SRS members Radovan Karadžić and Maja Gojković in the same source.

Since at least 2017, he has performed concerts at gatherings sponsored or otherwise involved with the Serbian Progressive Party, although he has never directly described himself as a party supporter. He expressed his condolences for the Novi Sad railway station canopy collapse victims and postponed his concert two weeks after the collapse.

In a 2025 interview, he stated he is "far from politics".

=== Interests ===
Pajčin enjoys buying carpets, TV antennas, sneakers, and tracksuits. He also enjoys vacuuming. He is a smoker and enjoys drinking alcohol, even to the point of drunkenness, having also met his first wife during a drunken stint.

He is a supporter of Red Star Belgrade. He is a fan of the Serbian rock band Riblja Čorba, its frontman Bora Đorđević, as well as the singers Zdravko Čolić and Goca Tržan.

Besides his native Serbian, he can speak English and Russian fluently.

== Honours ==
- Order of Njegoš, Republika Srpska, First Class (2024)

== Discography ==
=== Solo ===
- 1992 — Ne dam Krajine (I Won't Give Krajina)
- 1992 — Stan'te paše i Ustaše (Stand Back, Pashas and Ustashas)
- 1993 — Živeće ovaj narod (This Nation Will Live On)
- 1993 — Sve za srpstvo, srpstvo nizašta (Everything for Serbdom, Serbdom for Nothing)
- 1993 — Još se ništa ne zna (Nothing Is Known Yet)
- 1993 — Rat i mir (War and Peace)
- 1993 — Kockar bez sreće (Gambler without Luck)
- 1994 — Pobediće istina (The Truth Shall Prevail)
- 1995 — Igraju se delije (The Delije Are Dancing)
- 1995 — Idemo dalje (Let's Move On)
- 1995 — Zbogom oružje (A Farewell to Arms)
- 1997 — Ne dirajte njega (Do Not Touch Him)
- 1998 — Povratak u budućnost (Back to the Future)
- 1998 — Srpskim radikalima (To the Serbian Radicals)
- 1999 — Biti il' ne biti (To Be or Not to Be)
- 2000 — Zaljubljen i mlad (In Love and Young)
- 2001 — Đe si legendo (What's Up, Legend)
- 2002 — Zbogom pameti (Farewell, Reason)
- 2003 — Baja Mali Knindža: uživo (Baja Mali Knindža: Live)
- 2003 — Luda Žurka - uživo (Crazy Party - Live)
- 2006 — Za kim zvona zvone (For Whom the Bells Ring)
- 2007 — Gluvi barut (Deaf Gunpowder)
- 2011 — Idemo malena (Let's Go, Babygirl)
- 2012 — Lesi se vraća kući (Lassie Is Coming Home)
- 2014 — Govor duše (Speech of the Soul)

=== With Braća sa Dinare ===
- 1994 — Braća sa Dinare (Brothers from the Dinara)
- 1995 — Bila jednom jedna zemlja (Once There Was a Land)
- 1996 — Plači voljena zemljo (Cry, the Beloved Country)
- 1997 — Ja se svoga, ne odričem do groba (I Won't Give up What's Mine until the Grave)
- 1998 — Idemo do kraja (We're Going till the End)

== See also ==
- Marko Perković
