= Pridraga =

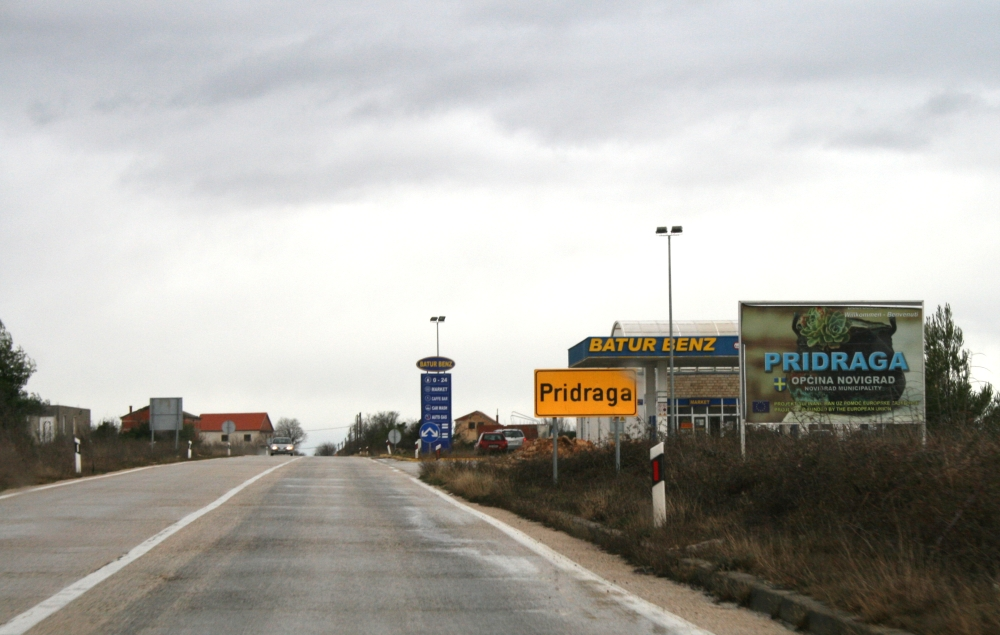

- Location within Croatia
- Coordinates: 44.153399°N 15.585049°E
- Country: Croatia
- County: Zadar County

Area
  - Total: 25.4 km^{2} (9.8 sq mi)

Population (2021)
  - Total: 1,346
  - Density: 53.0/km^{2} (137/sq mi)

Pridraga is a village in Dalmatia, Croatia, located southeast of Novigrad, Zadar County. The population is 1,470 (census 2011).
