= Islam Grčki =

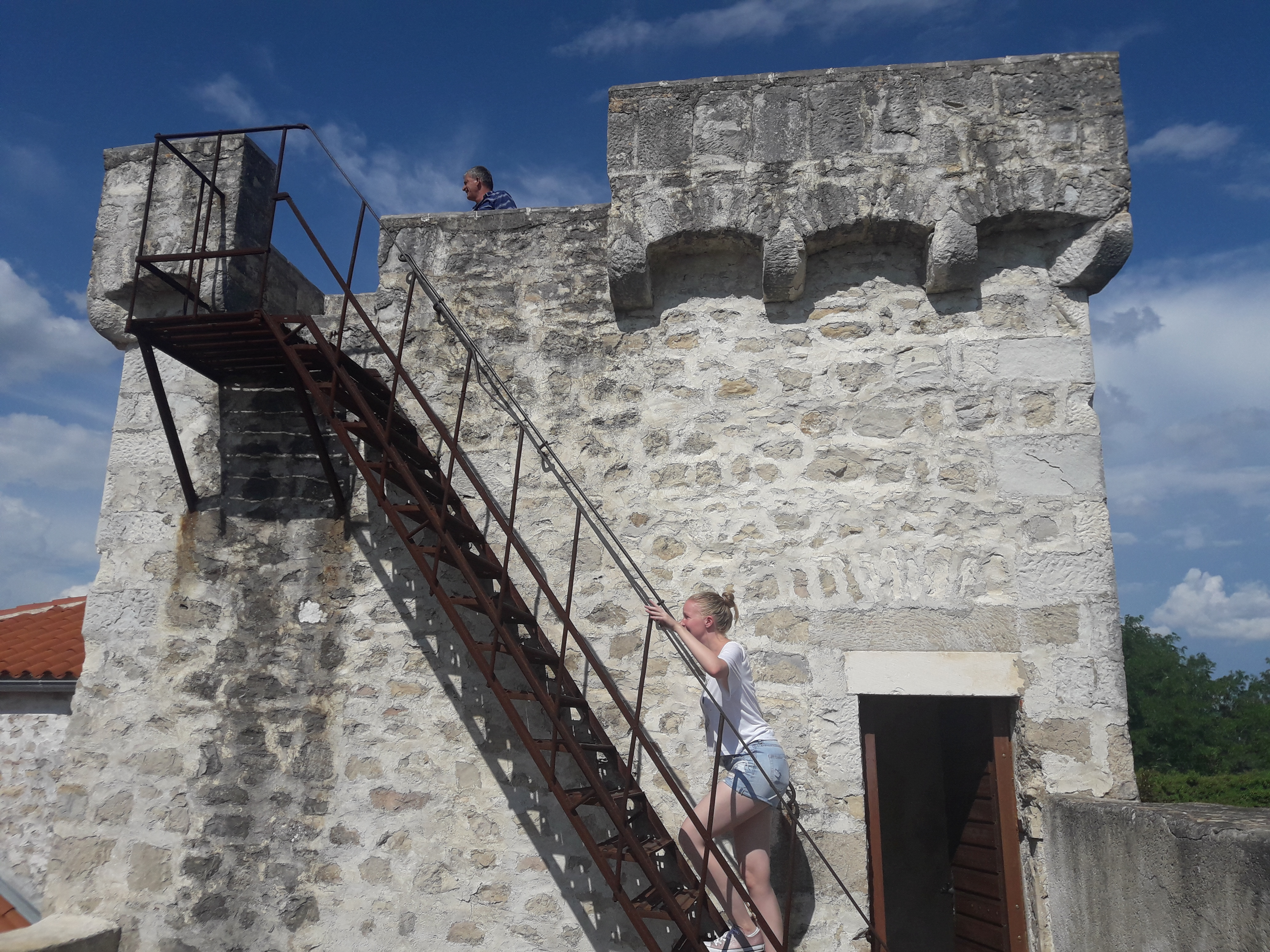
- The Kula Jankovića (Janković Tower), a fort in which Stojan Janković and his descendants lived. It is now owned by the Desnica family.

- Location within Croatia
- Coordinates: 44°10′N 15°27′E
- Country: Croatia
- County: Zadar
- Municipality: Benkovac

Area
  - Total: 13.8 km^{2} (5.3 sq mi)

Population (2021)
  - Total: 150
  - Density: 11/km^{2} (28/sq mi)
- Time zone: UTC+1 (CET)
  - Summer (DST): UTC+2 (CEST)

Islam Grčki is a village in the municipality of Benkovac, in the Zadar County, Croatia.

== Geography ==
Islam Grčki is located in the Ravni Kotari area, 23 kilometres (14 mi) from Benkovac and 20 km (12 mi) from Zadar. The village is also only 3 km (1.9 mi) from the Adriatic Sea but it does not play a major role in the village's economy.

== Name ==
The original name of the village was Saddislam, meaning "The wall of Islam" in Ottoman Turkish which marked the final frontier of the Ottoman Empire.

In the 18th century, when the village split in two, the name changed to Islam Grčki. While Islam stayed from the original name, the adjective Grčki (meaning "Greek") stands for the religion of the villagers - Orthodoxy. The other part of the split up village, Islam Latinski, got its name from the religious belief of its settlers - Catholicism.

== History ==
The history of Islam Grčki goes back to the Middle Ages. The village was an Uskok stronghold in the 16th and 17th century. The most notable Uskok leader Stojan Janković got possession of the village after the Cretan War. He built the villages most notable object - the Janković Kula.

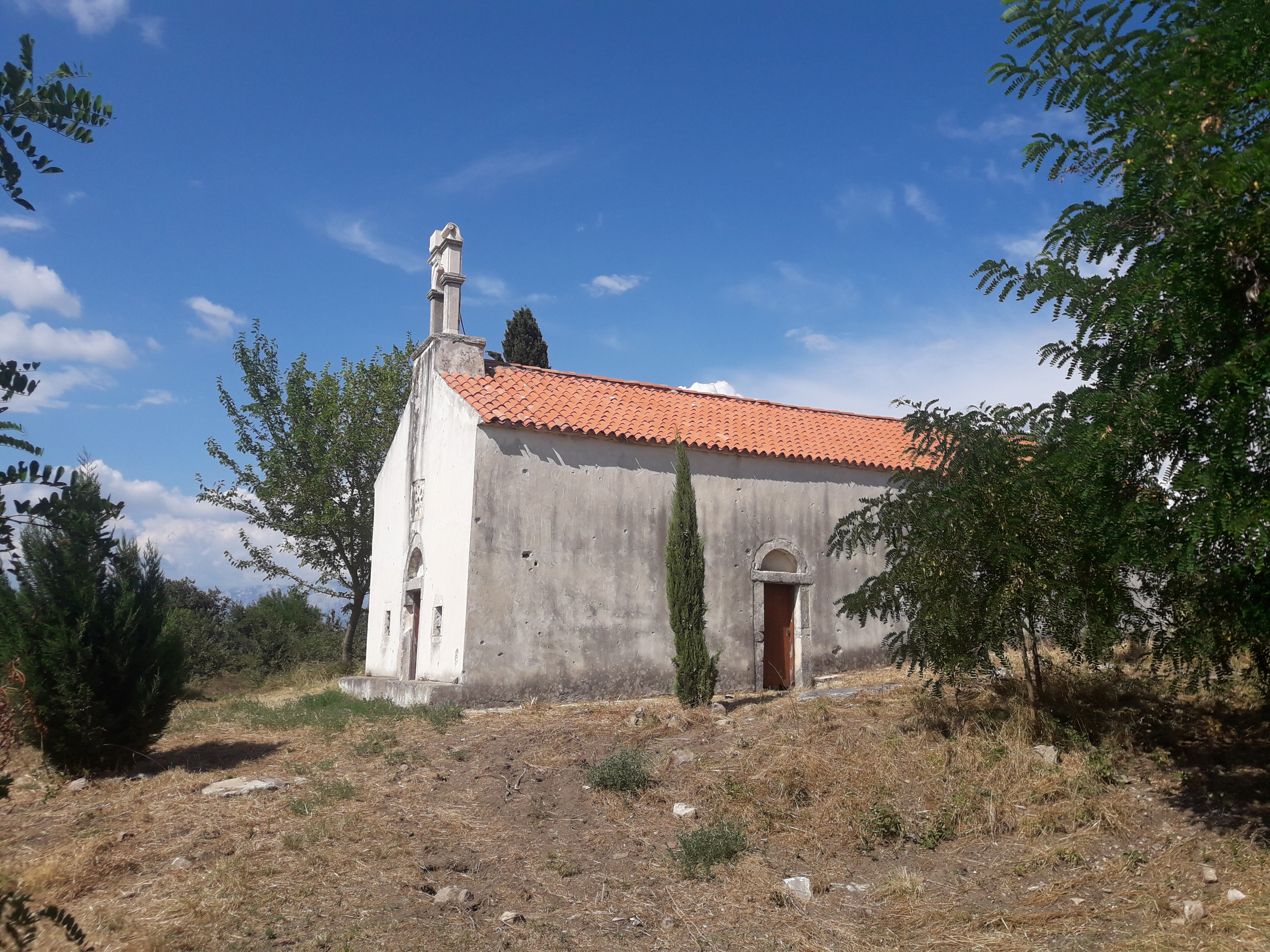
The Orthodox Church of St. George, Janković-church, built in 1675.

During World War II the village, a Serb enclave surrounded by Croatian villages, was a firm Chetnik militia stronghold. Some villagers also joined the Italian collaborationist Anti-Communist Volunteer Militia.

After World War II the village became part of the Socialist Republic of Croatia. During the Croatian war of independence the village was one of the first areas under Krajina Serb control. The village was partly destroyed by shelling during the Croatian-led Operation Maslenica and was overtaken by the Croatian forces on 22 January 1993.

A big part of the villages population fled during the war and the village itself suffered a lot material damage. Janković Kula, for instance, was destroyed in the shelling of 1993 but was being rebuilt as of 2012.

== Demographics ==
The village is predominantly ethnic Serb, and as of 2011 has 150 inhabitants. This represents 13.17% of its pre-war population according to the 1991 census.

The 1991 census recorded that 87.00% of the village population were ethnic Serbs (991/1139), 9.39% were Croats (107/1139) while 3.61% were of other ethnic origin (41/1139).

Village of Islam Grčki: Population trends 1857–2021
v

population	480	665	561	552	621	846	703	843	1117	1152	1277	1400	1239	1139	108	150	150
	1857	1869	1880	1890	1900	1910	1921	1931	1948	1953	1961	1971	1981	1991	2001	2011	2021

Sources: Croatian Bureau of Statistics publications

== Sights ==
- Orthodox Church of St. George
- The Stojan Janković' Tower

== See also ==
- Islam Latinski
- Operation Maslenica
- Donji Kašić
- Smoković
