= Suhovare =

- Village
- Location within Croatia
- Country: Croatia
- County: Zadar
- Municipality: Poličnik

Area
  - Total: 3.3 sq mi (8.5 km^{2})

Population (2021)
  - Total: 521
  - Density: 160/sq mi (61/km^{2})
- Time zone: UTC+1 (CET)
  - Summer (DST): UTC+2 (CEST)
- Postal code: 23241 Poličnik
- Area code: 023

Suhovare (historically Suovare) is a settlement in Poličnik, Dalmatia, Croatia.

== History ==
In 1332, knight Petar Mihovil's possessions and livestock held in the village of Suhovare (Zochovarie) were stolen.

The village was abandoned in 1571, then resettled during the establishment of Ottoman government. The rebuilt village was destroyed in 1646 by Venetian troops. It was restored by returnees following major military actions in the 18th century.

== Demographics ==
According to the 1991 census, the settlement's population was 891, of whom 99.21% were Croats. According to the 2011 census, the total population was 508.

== Sources ==
- Mayhew, Tea (2008). Dalmatia Between Ottoman and Venetian Rule: Contado Di Zara, 1645-1718. Viella. ISBN 978-88-8334-334-6.
