= Paljuv =

Settlement in Zadar County, Croatia

- Settlement
- Interactive map of Paljuv
- Location of Paljuv in Croatia
- Coordinates: 44°10′00″N 15°31′00″E
- Country: Croatia
- County: Zadar County
- Municipality: Novigrad

Area
  - Total: 16.0 km^{2} (6.2 sq mi)

Population (2021)
  - Total: 333
  - Density: 20.8/km^{2} (53.9/sq mi)
- Time zone: UTC+1 (CET)
  - Summer (DST): UTC+2 (CEST)
- Postal code: 23312 Novigrad
- Area code: +385 (0)23

Paljuv is a settlement in the Municipality of Novigrad in Croatia. In 2021, its population was 333.

== Demographics ==
Paljuv: Population trends 1857–2021
v

population	215		188	81	166	229	394	382	572	640	659	602	634	481	355	371	333
	1857	1869	1880	1890	1900	1910	1921	1931	1948	1953	1961	1971	1981	1991	2001	2011	2021

Sources: Croatian Bureau of Statistics publications
