= Murvica, Zadar County =

Coordinates: 44°08′47″N 15°19′19″E

Murvica (Zadar)
- Village
- Interactive map of Murvica (Zadar)
- Country: Croatia
- County: Zadar County
- Municipality: Poličnik

Area
  - Total: 10.5 km^{2} (4.1 sq mi)

Population (2021)
  - Total: 855
  - Density: 81.4/km^{2} (211/sq mi)
- Time zone: UTC+1 (CET)
  - Summer (DST): UTC+2 (CEST)

Murvica (pronounced [mûrvit͡sa]) is a village in Croatia, located in the Poličnik municipality in Zadar County. It is connected by the D8 highway.

== Bibliography ==
- Modrić, Oliver (2025-01-27). "Prijenos i zbrinjavanje gradiva župnih arhiva u Arhiv Zadarske nadbiskupije" [Transfer and storage of materials of the parish archives to the Archives of the Archdiocese of Zadar]. Vjesnik dalmatinskih arhiva (in Serbo-Croatian). 5: 109–124. doi:10.58565/vda.5.1.5. eISSN 2806-8459.
