= Smoković =

- Village
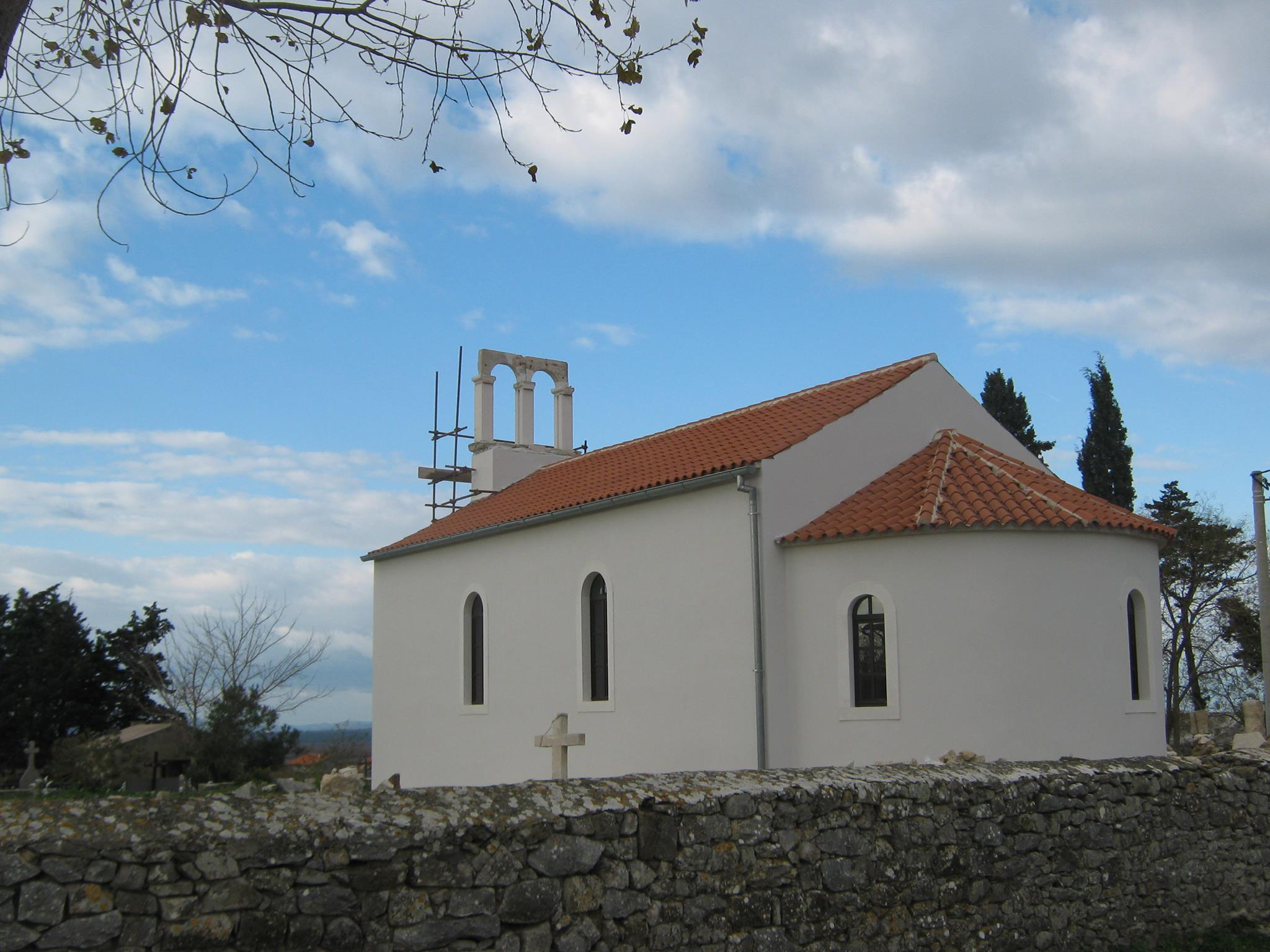
- Church of St. George after the war

- Location of Smoković in Croatia
- Coordinates: 44°08′04″N 15°21′11″E
- Country: Croatia
- Region: Adriatic Croatia
- County: Zadar
- Municipality: Zemunik Donji

Area
  - Total: 16.9 km^{2} (6.5 sq mi)
- Elevation: 93 m (305 ft)

Population (2021)
  - Total: 165
  - Density: 9.76/km^{2} (25.3/sq mi)
- Time zone: UTC+1 (CET)
  - Summer (DST): UTC+2 (CEST)
- Postal code: 23 222 Zemunik Donji
- Area code: (+385) 23

Smoković is a village in Croatia, in the municipality of Zemunik Donji, Zadar County.

== Demographics ==
According to the 2011 census, the village of Smoković has 110 inhabitants. This represents 10.69% of its pre-war population according to the 1991 census.

The 1991 census recorded that 96.12% of the village population were ethnic Serbs (989/1029), 1.26% were Yugoslavs (13/1029), 1.26% were ethnic Croats (13/1029), and 1.36% were of other ethnic origin (14/1029).

Historical population 1857-2011
v

population	376	377	472	483	570	641	738	867	1012	1113	1166	1107	1015	1029	50	110
	1857	1869	1880	1890	1900	1910	1921	1931	1948	1953	1961	1971	1981	1991	2001	2011

Sources: Croatian Bureau of Statistics publications

== Religion ==
The Church of St. George in Smoković was originally built in 1567. After the Croatian Army took control of the village on January 24, 1993, the church was destroyed with only parts of the apse and entrance wall remaining. It was rebuilt in 2014 with donations from the United States and Canada communities. The church is surrounded by a cemetery, and its icons were relocated to the Serbian Orthodox Church Museum in Belgrade for safekeeping during the war.

== Gallery ==
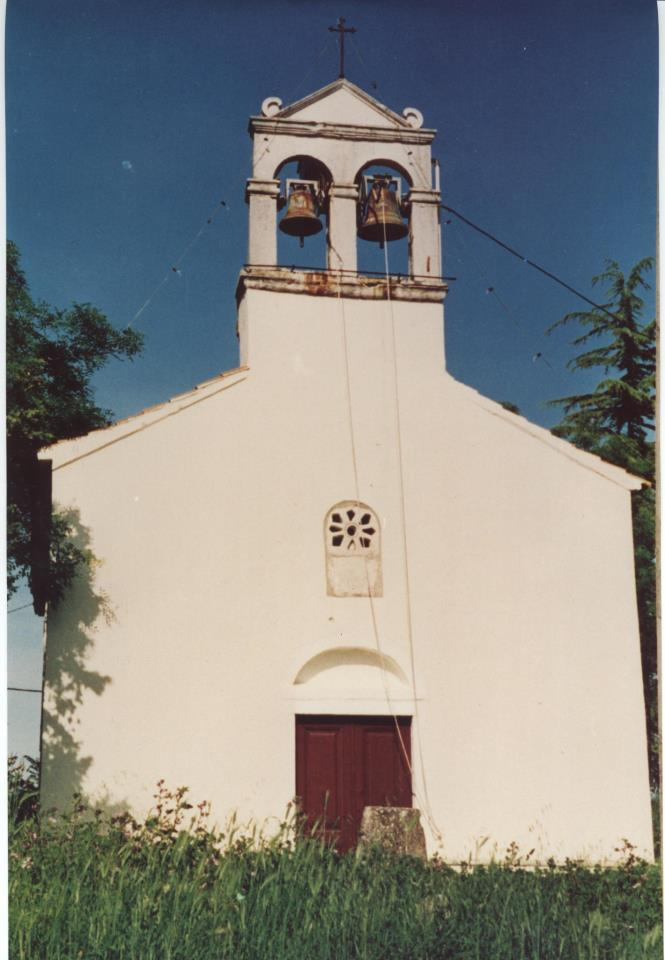
Church of St. George before the 1991-1995 war

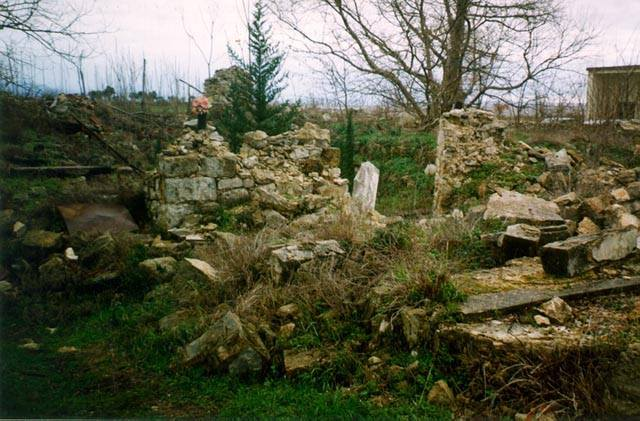
Church of St. George demolished (1993)

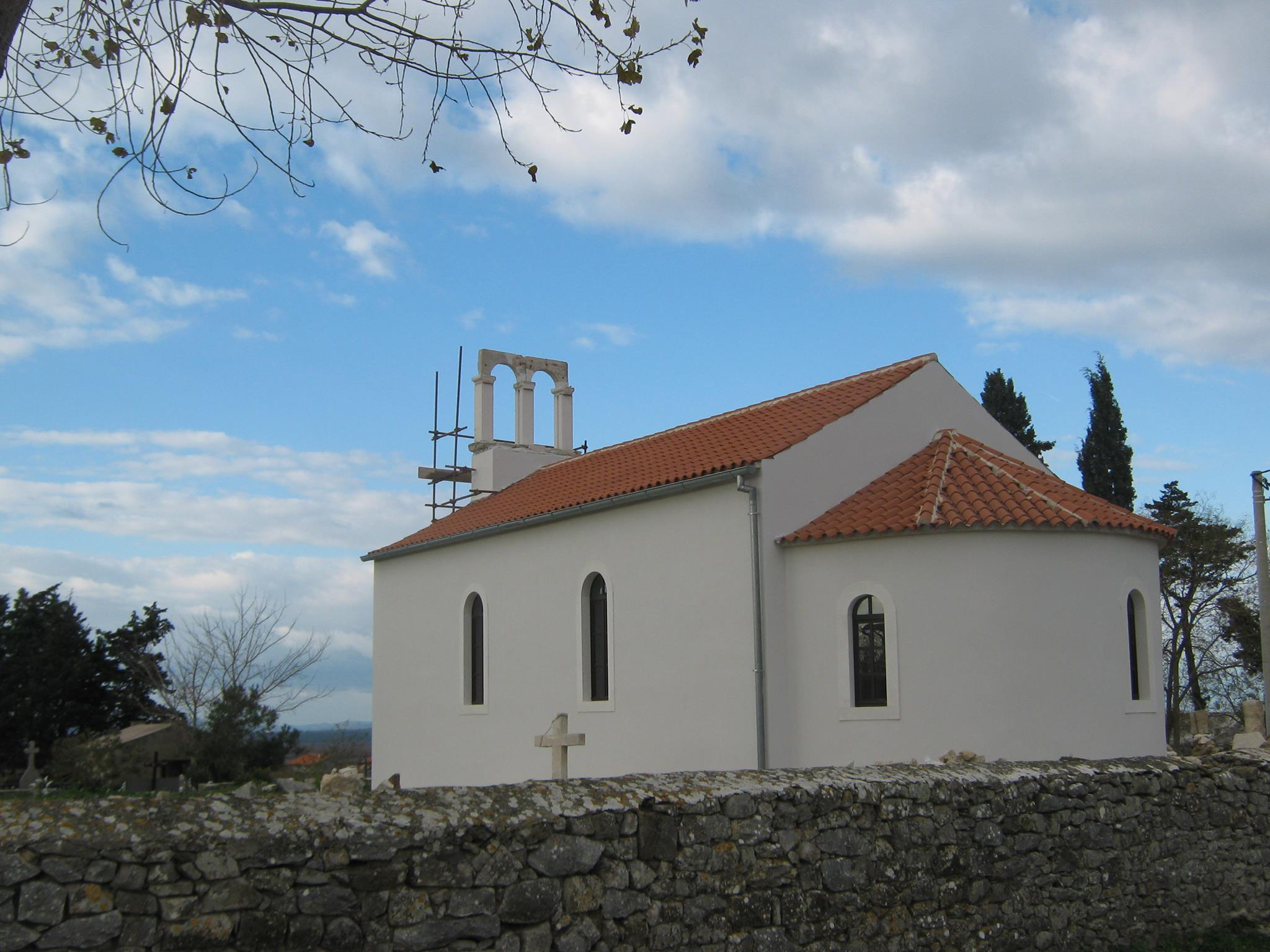
Church of St. George reconstructed

== See also ==
- Operation Maslenica
- Islam Grčki
- Donji Kašić
