= Filip Kapisoda =

Montenegrin model (1987–2010)

- Born: 3 April 1987; Cetinje, SR Montenegro, SFR Yugoslavia
- Died: 16 March 2010 (aged 22); Belgrade, Serbia
- Other name: Fika
- Occupation: Male model
- Status: deceased (suicide)
- Criminal charges: Murder of Ksenija Pajčin

Filip Kapisoda (3 April 1987 – 16 March 2010) was a Montenegrin model and former handball player, one of the contestants of the Serbian show, Veliki Brat VIP All Stars (Big Brother VIP All Stars) in which he reached the finals in third place. Because of his attractive looks, Kapisoda received an offer from the designer Rocco Barocco, but he rejected it in order to create a career in Montenegro. As a participant in multiple fashion shows, Kapisoda won many awards. He received recognition as the best model of Belgrade Fashion Week 2006. Kapisoda murdered his girlfriend Ksenija Pajčin and then committed suicide.

== Death ==
On 16 March 2010, the bodies of Kapisoda and his girlfriend, the 32-year-old singer Ksenija Pajčin, were found in her apartment in Belgrade. Both had gunshot wounds to the head. Police suspect a murder-suicide, with Kapisoda as the shooter. Police were called to the house several nights earlier as the couple were reported by neighbors because Kapisoda had broken into Pajčin's apartment, knocking down the door. Early investigation reports stated that the dead bodies were discovered by the singer's mother, and that the gun used in the homicide was found next to Kapisoda's body. It is believed that the motive for the murder-suicide was jealousy.

He was buried on 19 March 2010 in Cetinje, the day before Pajčin's funeral. His funeral was attended by his brother, the handball player Petar Kapisoda and his friend, the singer Goga Sekulić.

== See also ==
- List of suicides (A–M)
