= Islam Latinski =

Village in Dalmatia, Croatia

- Village
- Location within Croatia
- Coordinates: 44°11′32″N 15°26′26″E
- Country: Croatia
- Region: Dalmatia
- County: Zadar County
- Municipality: Posedarje

Area
  - Total: 3.8 km^{2} (1.5 sq mi)

Population (2021)
  - Total: 314
  - Density: 83/km^{2} (210/sq mi)
- Time zone: UTC+1 (CET)
  - Summer (DST): UTC+2 (CEST)

Islam Latinski is a village of Dalmatia, in the Zadar County, Croatia. Administered as a part of the Posedarje Municipality, it is one of the two settlements that comprised the historical village of Islam, the other being Islam Grčki.

Islam Latinski has a predominantly Croatian population.

== Name ==
The original name of the village was Saddislam, meaning "the wall of Islam" in Turkish which marked the final frontier of the Ottoman Empire.

In the 18th century, when the village split in two, the name changed to Islam Latinski. While Islam stayed from the original name, the adjective (Latinski meaning "Latin") stands for the religion of the villagers - "Latin" Catholicism. The other part of the split up village, Islam Grčki, got its name from the religious belief of its settlers - "Greek" Orthodoxy.

A former Italian name was Sant'Anastasia Bassa.

== Demographics ==
Village of Islam Latinski: Population trends 1857–2021
v

population	348	325	221	200	228	268	572	602	477	561	641	653	606	688	436	284	314
	1857	1869	1880	1890	1900	1910	1921	1931	1948	1953	1961	1971	1981	1991	2001	2011	2021

Sources: Croatian Bureau of Statistics publications
