= Kninjas =

Paramilitary unit

- Knindže
- Active: 1991–1994
- Allegiance: Republic of Serbian Krajina
- Branch: Army of Serbian Krajina
- Size: 64 soldiers
- Nickname: Red Berets
- Engagements: Croatian War of Independence; 1991 Yugoslav campaign in Croatia; Operation Stinger; Battle of Hrvatska Kostajnica; Battles for Glina; Operation Steel '93; Bosnian War; Operation Corridor 92; Operation Spider

Commanders
- Notable commanders: Dragan Vasiljković

Insignia
- Emblem: Serbian cross

The Kninjas (Serbian: Книнџе / Knindže), also known as the Red Berets, was a Serb paramilitary unit and a volunteer militia supporting the Army of Serb Krajina during the Croatian War of Independence. It was based in Knin, the capital of breakaway SAO Krajina that became the Republic of Serb Krajina (RSK).

It was led by Serbian-Australian Dragan Vasiljković, known as "Captain Dragan", and who was later convicted of war crimes. The unit was one of several notable Serb paramilitary units, alongside the White Eagles, Serbian Volunteer Guard, Scorpions, Wolves of Vučjak, and others.

== Name ==
The name, a pun on "Knin" and "Ninjas", was informal; the unit did not have an official name, but the term was used for the mostly Vasiljković-trained volunteers.

== History ==
Vasiljković, who had served in the Australian Army, had returned to Yugoslavia in 1990 during the Croatian independence movement, eventually being hired as an instructor for volunteers in the summer of 1991. At this time, Belgrade daily Politika published a comic book named The Demons Return that featured the Kninjas fighting the Croats with martial arts. The unit, deemed elite, was a special unit that answered in part to Knin police chief Milan Martić. According to Martić himself, he was supplied of equipment and weapons mostly from the Serbian government. It became the special forces of the RSK Interior Ministry.

Members of the unit were involved in the December 1991 Bruška massacre.

Veterans of the unit later joined the Special Operations Unit of the Federal Republic of Yugoslavia.

Vasiljković served a fifteen-year prison sentence for war crimes by the Croatian court in Split. He was released from prison on March 28, 2020.

The emblem was a customized Serbian cross, with blue background and inverted firesteels. In the 257 operations conducted by the Kninjas, only one out of the 64 soldiers died due to a direct explosion by a grenade on his head and another four were injured.

== Cultural impact ==
The Bosnian Serb singer Baja Mali Knindža chose his stagename in honour of the Kninjas. He has also recorded a well-known song called Knindže Krajišnici ("Kninjas of the Krajina").

== Sources ==
- John B. Allcock; Marko Milivojević; John Joseph Horton (1998). Conflict in the former Yugoslavia: an encyclopedia. ABC-CLIO. ISBN 978-0-87436-935-9.
- Thompson, Mark (1 January 1999). Forging War: The Media in Serbia, Croatia, Bosnia and Hercegovina. University of Luton Press. ISBN 978-1-86020-552-1.
- John Oppenheim; Willem-Jan van der Wolf (1997). Global War Crimes Tribunal Collection. Vol. 3. Global Law Association.
