= Dragan Vasiljković =

Serbian commander during Yugoslav wars

- Драган Васиљковић
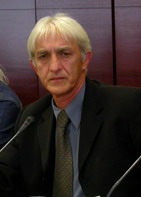
- Vasiljković in 2005
- Born: 12 December 1954 (age 71); Belgrade, PR Serbia, Yugoslavia
- Spouse: Nada Lukich-Bruce (m. 2010)
- Military career
- Allegiance: Republic of Serbian Krajina
- Branch: Army of Serbian Krajina
- Service years: 1991–1995
- Rank: Captain
- Nickname: Captain Dragan
- Unit: Kninjas
- Conflicts: Croatian War of Independence; 1991 Yugoslav campaign in Croatia; Operation Stinger; Battle of Hrvatska Kostajnica; Battles for Glina; Operation Steel '93

Dragan Vasiljković (Serbian Cyrillic: Драган Васиљковић; born 12 December 1954), nicknamed Captain Dragan (Serbian: Капетан Драган, Kapetan Dragan) is a convicted war criminal and former commander of a Serb paramilitary unit called the Kninjas during the Yugoslav Wars. In 2005, prosecutors in Croatia accused him of committing alleged war crimes during the wars. A warrant for his arrest was subsequently issued by Interpol.

He was arrested in Australia in January 2006, and ordered to prison by the High Court of Australia in anticipation for extradition to Croatia to face prosecution for his alleged crimes. He was extradited to Croatia on 8 July 2015 after losing his thirteenth appeal and sentenced to 15 years in prison on 26 September 2017 by the County Court in the city of Split. Dragan was released from prison in March 2020 after serving his sentence.

== Early life ==
Dragan Vasiljković was born on 12 December 1954 in a Serbian Orthodox family in Belgrade. His father Živorad died in a motorcycle accident while Dragan was still young. At the age of 3, his mother moved to Australia with her two children from a previous marriage, and Vasiljković ended up in an orphanage and later a foster home. At the age of thirteen he joined his mother and two siblings in Australia under the name Daniel Snedden.

As a juvenile, he ended up in trouble with the law several times. He was accused of robbery and selling stolen goods and later was charged with forcing women into prostitution. At the suggestion of a judge, he joined the army. He spent 4 years in the Australian Army's reserve unit 4th/19th Prince of Wales's Light Horse. After his military service, he served as a weapons instructor in Africa and South America. He was sailing around the world and stayed in Serbia in 1988 where he set up a boat and airplane charter business. He was convicted of criminal charges in relation to brothel ownership in Elsternwick, a suburb of Melbourne, Australia during the 1980s. He also worked as a golf instructor in Australia.

== War in Croatia ==
He returned to Belgrade in May 1990, as Croatia held its first parliamentary elections. In Belgrade, Vasiljković met Saša Medaković, one of the leaders of the barricades in Krajina following the Log Revolution in August.

Medaković was a friend of Knin chief of police Milan Martić, and was an employee of Krajina state security. Vasiljković visited Krajina in the autumn 1990. There, he met Martić and claimed that the defence of Krajina appeared "very disorganised". He thus decided to help organise the Krajina defence. On his return to Belgrade, he attempted to gather support for his effort, and became a member of the opposition Serbian Renewal Movement. He then returned to the United States to complete his aviator training.

During the March 1991 Belgrade upheaval when the Serbian Renewal Movement's challenge to the government was met with tanks in the streets, Vasiljković was compelled to return there. Srba Milovanov introduced him to several Serbian State Security personnel, among them Franko Simatović. Simatović told him of his Krajina-related activities that if his bosses were to learn about it, he would probably be arrested and dismissed. On 4 April, Vasiljković went to Krajina to work for Martić. On 25 June 1991, Croatia proclaimed its independence; soon after, war broke out in Croatia. He served during the Croatian War of Independence under the newly created Republic of Serbian Krajina as a volunteer. International Criminal Tribunal for the former Yugoslavia prosecutors claim that this service took place under Serbian police auspices, and media even reported that he claimed this during his testimony at the trial of Slobodan Milošević in 2003.

He commanded special units known as Red Berets. He trained units at Krajina's Golubić training camp for which he was allegedly paid by the State Security Service of Serbia; he denied this at the Milosevic trial, despite his role as a prosecution witness. He added that the only time that the Serbian State Security paid him was for a 28-day stint in 1997 "to monitor exercises"; his fee was 2,200 dinars. He was allied with Interior Minister Milan Martić in his power struggle with president Milan Babić, whom he described as "dishonest, a man who was not of his word." Martić, in contrast, he considered to be "a man of honour and a man of his word."

In November 1991, Babić called Vojislav Šešelj to Knin to help him thwart what he believed to be a coup attempt being planned by Vasiljković himself. According to Šešelj, "Captain Dragan interfered and started a rebellion among the army ranks", and organised a rally of military personnel. The rally, Šešelj said, proved a failure and Babic remained in power. Šešelj also testified at the Milosevic trial that Vasiljković had a training camp in Golubic. During the war, he founded the Kapetan Dragan Fund aimed at helping victims of war.

== Life in Serbia ==
After the end of combat in Croatia and Bosnia and Herzegovina, Vasiljković returned to Serbia where he lived for several years. Vasiljković was involved in the Serbian Renewal Movement. He maintained his friendship with Franko Simatović, and in 2001 stated that he would defend him in court if necessary. Simatović was arrested by the Serbian Police and transferred to the ICTY in 2003. Vasiljković reemerged in the spotlight after he testified against Slobodan Milošević in 2004 at the ICTY, and subsequently moved back to Perth, Western Australia.

== Allegation ==
In September 2005, an article in The Australian newspaper accused Vasiljković of war crimes as a Serbian paramilitary commander between 1991 and 1994. Vasiljković made a short return to Serbia and held a press conference in Belgrade before returning to Australia. He lodged a public defamation case against the publishing company Nationwide News for the article, but in December 2009 the court ruled against Vasiljković, and ordered him to pay them $1.2 million.

Vasiljković was arrested on the basis of a Croatian warrant in January. He is accused by the Republic of Croatia of being responsible for soldiers under his command allegedly torturing, beating and killing captured members of Croatian Army and Police between June and July 1991 in a prison on the fortress in Knin, and also for making plans to attack and take over the Glina Police station, a near city village Jukince and the villages Gornji and Donji Viduševac in February 1993 at Benkovac in agreement with the commander of the tank unit JNA. It is alleged that during that, in violation of the Geneva convention, civil buildings were damaged and ruined, Croatian citizens' property was robbed and civilians were wounded and killed, including a German journalist, Egon Scotland. Those accusations were made public after the newspaper The Australian reported a story about him.

Vasiljković gave evidence during Milosević's trial at the Hague in 2003 without immunity. The ICTY named Vasiljković as a "participant in a joint criminal enterprise" against Croats and other non-Serbs in the judgement against Martić, but did not request his arrest. All of the others named are either already on trial at the Hague or at large. In 2005, ICTY spokesperson Florence Hartmann announced that Vasiljković had been under investigation, but that it had stopped due to the mandate on the tribunal to finish its work. Dragan subsequently sued The Australian for defamation. In July 2007, the Supreme Court held that 6 out of 10 imputations in that article were defamatory. However, in December 2009, a judge ruled that Vasiljković "committed torture and rape" and that The Australian article from 2005 proved that Vasiljković participated and committed the allegations against him.

== Extradition hearing in Australia ==
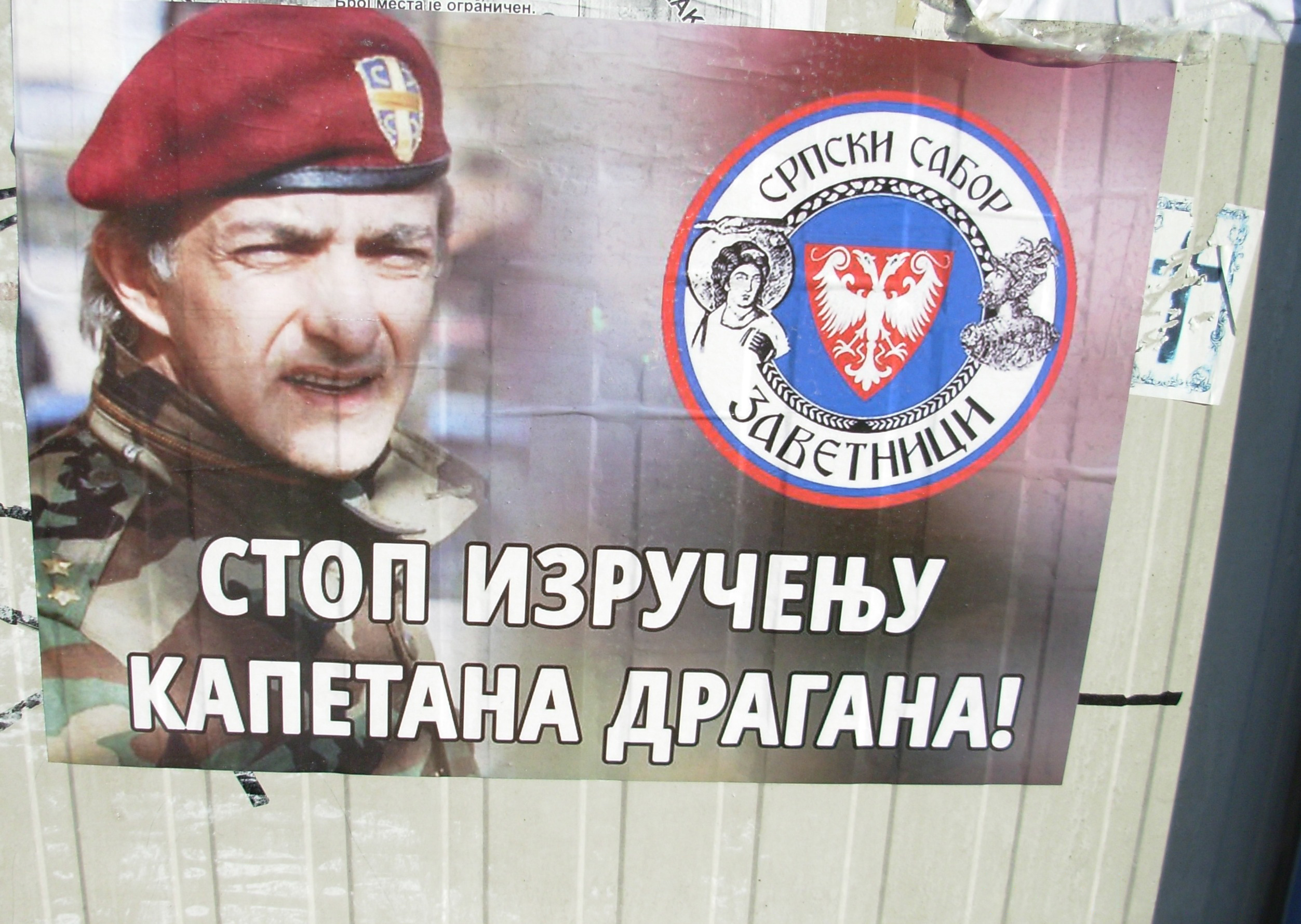
A poster protesting the extradition of Vasiljković

In December 2006, Vasiljković's bid to prevent his extradition hearing from going ahead failed in the Sydney Magistrates Court. His grounds of defense were that as a Serbian Captain, he believed that he would be facing a biased Croatian Court and that no evidence of the allegations are required under the Extradition Act 1988, for an Australian citizen to be extradited.

On 12 April 2007, authorities in Sydney granted Croatia's extradition request, with Vasiljković being held pending appeal at Parklea Correctional Centre in its maximum security section on protection. By April 2007, the Serbian community of Australia had spent over $500,000 on Vasiljković's defence. An application for bail pending an appeal to the Federal Court of Australia was dismissed.

On 3 February 2009, Vasiljković appeal against extradition to Croatia was rejected by the Federal Court.^{,} Among those coming to the defence of Vasiljković was the Serbian Orthodox bishop of Australia and New Zealand, Irinej Dobrijević. On 2 September 2009, Federal Court of Australia ruled that "there was a substantial or real chance of prejudice" if he was extradited to Croatia, ordering release, pending appeal. He subsequently walked free from Parklea prison in Sydney's west on 4 September 2009. The Australian government appealed the ruling, and in March 2010, the High Court of Australia overturned the Federal Court decision and ruled that Vasiljković should be extradited to Croatia. After the ruling, Vasiljković was nowhere to be found, prompting the Australian Federal Police to launch a nationwide manhunt.

== Final arrest and appeals ==
Vasiljković was captured by federal police in New South Wales on 12 May 2010, 43 days after his disappearance. On 19 May, the Australian Court rejected Vasiljković's defence that Croatian courts would not give him a fair trial and that claims that Croatian courts had been more lenient towards Croats were "scanty" and "feeble".

On 16 November 2012, the Australian Government decided to extradite Vasiljković to Croatia. Vasiljković challenged the decision to the Federal Court but was unsuccessful. Vasiljković appealed to the Full Court of the Federal Court, but on 12 December 2014 the Full Court rejected the appeal, clearing him for extradition to Croatia. On 15 May 2015, the High Court of Australia refused Vasiljković leave to appeal the December 2014 Federal Court ruling due to the unlikelihood of a successful outcome for him. Following this decision, he had no remaining legal avenue to challenge his extradition.

== Extradition ==
On the morning of 8 July 2015, Australia surrendered Vasiljković to Croatian police officers at Sydney Airport, his thirteen separate legal challenges against the extradition process having failed. Upon arrival at Zagreb International Airport the following day, he was transferred by a high-security police motorcade to an isolated wing of a jail in Split.

== Trial in Croatia ==
At his first interview with prosecutors, he stated that he did not feel guilty of the war crimes that allegedly he committed, and dismissed his state-appointed attorney. In July 2016, he entered a formal plea of not guilty to unspecified war crimes, and the trial commenced on 20 September 2016. In September 2017, Vasiljković received a 15-year sentence by the Croatian court in Split. Upon completion of his sentence, which included the time spent in detention in Australia, he was released from prison on 28 March 2020.

== Sources ==
- Extradition (Croatia) Regulations 2004 (Cth)
- Submission by Dr David A Chaikin to the Inquiry into Australia's Extradition Law, Policy and Practice held by the Joint Standing Committee on Treaties.
- Extradition Act 1988 (Cth) s 7 Meaning of extradition objection
- Model Treaty on Extradition
- "ICTY:Justice at Risk: Concerns Pertaining to the Judiciary". Human Rights Watch.
