= Wolves of Vučjak =

Paramilitary unit

Wolves of Vučjak Вукови с Вучјака Vukovi s Vučjaka
- Insignia of the Wolves of Vučjak
- Active: 22 June 1991–1995
- Type: Paramilitary
- Garrison/HQ: Prnjavor, Bosnia and Herzegovina
- Nickname: Vučjaci
- Engagements: Croatian War of Independence; Bosnian War

Commanders
- Commander: Veljko Milanković

Wolves of Vučjak (Serbian: Вукови с Вучјака, romanized: Vukovi s Vučjaka) was a paramilitary unit active in the Croatian War of Independence and the Bosnian War. It was established in Prnjavor, Bosnia and Herzegovina.

They were active in fighting in Okučani, Jasenovac and Novska. In August, 1991 the unit took over the transmitter on Kozara, and replaced RTV Sarajevo with Serb programming. Its leader Veljko Milanković was badly wounded on February 4, 1993 and later died at the Medical Academy on February 14.

A witness testified to the International Criminal Tribunal for the former Yugoslavia during Serbian leader Slobodan Milošević's trial that the Wolves were trained in Knin by Dragan Vasiljković, "Captain Dragan".

In 2007, it was announced that the paramilitary's commander Veljko Milanković would have a street named after him in Novi Sad. Non-governmental groups protested the decision. The proposed change was vetoed by the Ministry of Local Self-Government.

== See also ==
- Serbian paramilitary
