= Zemunik Gornji =

Coordinates: 44°06′32″N 15°25′54″E

- Village
- Interactive map of Zemunik Gornji
- Country: Croatia

Area
  - Total: 17.9 km^{2} (6.9 sq mi)

Population (2021)
  - Total: 437
  - Density: 24.4/km^{2} (63.2/sq mi)
- Time zone: UTC+1 (CET)
  - Summer (DST): UTC+2 (CEST)

Zemunik Gornji is a village in Croatia. It is connected by the D502 highway.
