= Donji Kašić =

- Village
- Location of Donji Kašić in Croatia
- Coordinates: 44°09′04″N 15°28′23″E
- Country: Croatia
- Region: Adriatic Croatia
- County: Zadar
- Municipality: Benkovac

Area
  - Total: 8.5 km^{2} (3.3 sq mi)
- Elevation: 199 m (653 ft)

Population (2021)
  - Total: 69
  - Density: 8.1/km^{2} (21/sq mi)
- Time zone: UTC+1 (CET)
  - Summer (DST): UTC+2 (CEST)
- Postal code: 23 420 Benkovac
- Area code: (+385) 23

Donji Kašić is a village in Croatia, in the municipality/town of Benkovac, Zadar County.

== Demographics ==
According to the 2011 census, the village of Donji Kašić has 63 inhabitants. This represents 8.24% of its pre-war population according to the 1991 census.

The 1991 census recorded that 98.96% of the village population were ethnic Serbs (757/765), 0.26% were Yugoslavs (2/765), 0.26% were ethnic Croats (2/765), and 0.52% were of other ethnic origin (4/765).

Historical population 1857-2011
v

population	218		253	196	230	317	545	482	711	750	846	823	810	765	4	63
	1857	1869	1880	1890	1900	1910	1921	1931	1948	1953	1961	1971	1981	1991	2001	2011

Sources: Croatian Bureau of Statistics publications

== See also ==
- Operation Maslenica
- Islam Grčki
- Smoković
