= Gubin, Livno =

Gubin Губин
- Village
- Location within Bosnia and Herzegovina
- Country: Bosnia and Herzegovina
- Entity: Federation of Bosnia and Herzegovina
- Canton: Canton 10
- Township: Livno

Area
  - Total: 25.73 km^{2} (9.93 sq mi)

Population (2013)
  - Total: 91
  - Density: 3.5/km^{2} (9.2/sq mi)
- Time zone: UTC+1 (CET)
  - Summer (DST): UTC+2 (CEST)

Gubin (Serbian Cyrillic: Губин) is a village in the Township of Livno in Canton 10 of the Federation of Bosnia and Herzegovina, an entity of Bosnia and Herzegovina.

== History ==
In June 1941, on the Eastern Orthodox Pentecost, Ustaše from Livno raided the village. The Ustaše carried out atrocities in the region. Several locals joined the 4th Krajina Brigade of the Yugoslav Partisans. Croat forces destroyed the village during and after the Yugoslav wars, but organisations such as the United Methodist Church have raised funds to help rebuild the village. The local Serb population fled to Serbia in 1995 amid Operation Storm, and a small number has since returned.

== Demographics ==
According to the 1991 census, the village had 366 inhabitants, 361 of whom were Serbs.

According to the 2013 census, its population was 91

Ethnicity in 2013
Ethnicity	Number	Percentage
Serbs	86	94.5%
Croats	5	5.5%
Total	91	100%

== In pop-culture ==
It has been sung about in many of the Serbian nationalist singer Baja Mali Knindža's songs.

== Notable people ==
- Baja Mali Knindža
- Lazo Pajčin

== Bibliography ==
- Ethnicity/National Affiliation, Religion and Mother Tongue (PDF). Sarajevo: Agency for Statistics of Bosnia and Herzegovina. 2019.
