= Süleyman's invasions of Montenegro =

Military campaigns

- Part of Great Turkish War
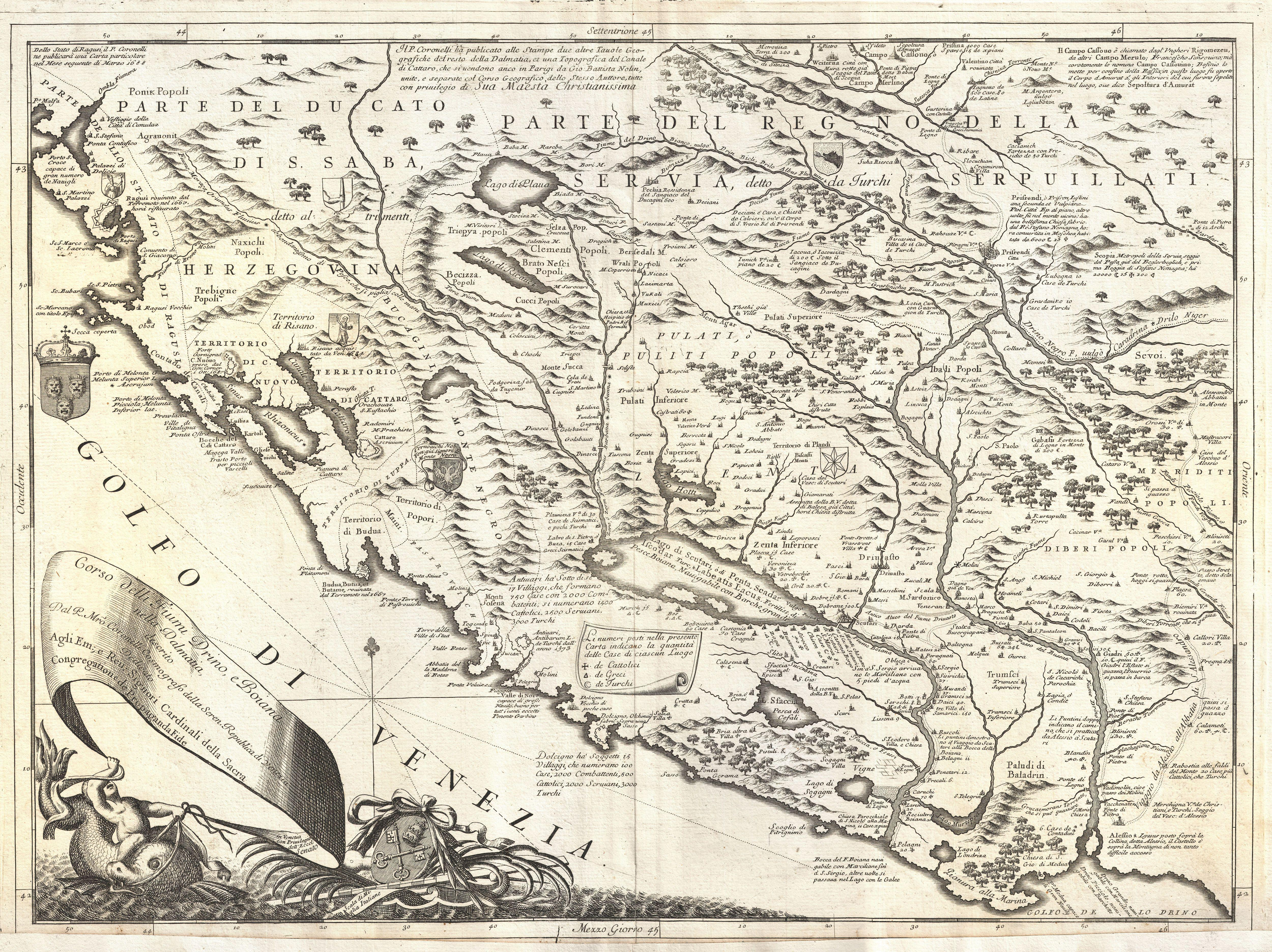
- Map of the Scutari region and Old Montenegro by Vincenzo Coronelli (1610).
Date	First invasion: 1685; Second invasion: 1692
Location	Montenegro
Result	Scutari victory: Süleyman Pasha reasserts his claim over the Montenegro vilayet.; Retreat of Venetian forces.

Belligerents
Sanjak of Scutari	Montenegro; Republic of Venice

Commanders and leaders
Süleyman Pasha (WIA)	Bajo Pivljanin †; Francesco Morosini

Units involved
Bushati family Brđani tribes Gheg Albanians	Montenegrin hajduks Troops from the Bay of Kotor; Venetian troops and irregulars

Strength
Large	Unknown

Casualties and losses
Unknown	Heavy

The Süleyman invasions of Montenegro were a series of military campaigns led by Süleyman Bushati, the sanjak-bey of the Sanjak of Scutari, against the Vilayet of Montenegro and the Republic of Venice. The campaign would be carried out in 2 invasions, with the first one happening in 1685 and the second in 1692.

== Background ==
Süleyman's feud with the Venetians began before he achieved the position of sanjak-bey of Scutari. In 1683, they would attempt to assassinate him by using poision, however this failed. The following year, in 1684, the Venetians led a campaign in Montenegro against the Ottomans, landing in Kotor and capturing the fortress of Budva which was guarded by a small garrison, before beginning a march to Shkoder. They were stopped by the Bushati in between Kotor and Tivar, where they were defeated. Upon sending the captured Venetian officers, flags and generals, to Istanbul he would be given the title of pasha.

== Timeline ==
=== Prelude ===
As soon as Süleyman Bushati was appointed Sanjak-bey of Scutari, he would pay close attention to the Montenegro Vilayet. This led to him discovering the relations between Montenegro and the Republic of Venice. After hearing talks between Rufim Boljević and provveditore Antonio Zeno, Süleyman would make it his goal to separate the relations of the Montenegrins and Brđani with the Venetians.

=== First invasion ===
During the Great Turkish War, in 1685, Süleyman led his own contingent with the goal of attacking Montenegro and capturing the capital of Cetinje. He would be stopped near the hill of Vrtijeljka by a group of 1,200 hajduks led by Bajo Pivljanin and Vuković the Arbanas, leading to a battle on 7 May 1685. The Montenegrin forces were also made up of troops from the Bay of Kotor together with Primorci and Mahine tribesmen. The battle resulted in a victory for the Sanjak of Scutari, with most of the Montenegrin troops being killed, including Bajo and Vuković.

Afterwards, Süleyman recruited the Brđani tribes who were in a dispute with Montenegro. With their help, he would penetrate towards Cetinje, entering the city together with 500 heads of Montenegrin soldiers, with which he paraded around the city. He would also attack the Cetinje monastery and the palace of Ivan Crnojević. This campaign led to Süleyman asserting his control over the Montenegro Vilayet.

=== Second invasion ===
In 1692, the Venetians had re-entered Montenegro. This led to Süleyman invading Montenegro again with the help of the Brđani, who at the time were raiders who plundered the regions of Plav and Gusinje and possibly Peja in some instances. The Scutari-Brđani forces entered Cetinje and drove away the Venetians after a short battle.

Süleyman would make an agreement with the Venetians which included 11 terms and the total Venetian withdrawal from Montenegro. Before leaving, the Venetians rigged their former stronghold where Süleyman was located, which exploded, killing dozens of Scutari-Ottoman troops as well as wounding Süleyman himself.

=== Result ===
After his success against the Montenegrins and Venetians, Süleyman would be given the title of beylerbey of Rumelia in 1694. According to Eqrem Vlora, he would instead become the sanjak-bey of Elbasan between 1693–1695.
