= Bajo Pivljanin =

Serbian military leader

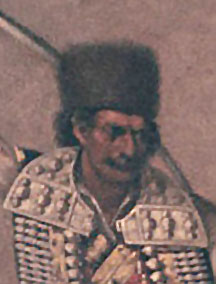
- Detail from Bajo Pivljanin kills a Turk (1878)
- Born: Dragojlo Nikolić c. 1630; Piva, Sanjak of Herzegovina (now Montenegro)
- Died: 7 May 1685 (aged c. 55); Vrtijeljka, near Cetinje, Prince-Bishopric of Montenegro
- Military career
- Allegiance: Republic of Venice
- Service years: 1656–1685
- Rank: harambaša (1668–); buljubaša (1666)
- Conflicts: Cretan War; Great Turkish War; Süleyman's invasions of Montenegro; Battle of Vrtijeljka †

Bajo Pivljanin (Serbian Cyrillic: Бајо Пивљанин c. 1630 – 7 May 1685), born Dragojlo Nikolić (Serbian Cyrillic: Драгојло Николић), was a Serbian hajduk commander mostly active in the Ottoman territories of Herzegovina and southern Dalmatia. Born in Piva, a Serbian Herzegovinian tribe, at the time part of the Ottoman Empire, he was an oxen trader who allegedly left his village after experiencing Ottoman injustice. Mentioned in 1654 as a brigand during the Venetian–Ottoman war, he entered the service of the Republic of Venice in 1656. The hajduks were used to protect Venetian Dalmatia. He remained a low-rank hajduk for the following decade, participating in some notable operations such as the raid on Trebinje. Between 1665 and 1668 he quickly rose through the ranks to the level of harambaša ("bandit leader"). After the war, which ended unfavourably for the Venetians, the hajduks were moved out of their haven in the Bay of Kotor under Ottoman pressure. Between 1671 and 1684 Pivljanin, along with other hajduks and their families, were refugees in Dalmatia. Upon renewed conflict, he was returned to the Bay of Kotor and placed in charge of defending the frontier; in 1685 he and his band fell in battle against the advancing Ottoman governor of Scutari. Regarded as one of the most distinguished hajduks of his time, he is praised in Serbian epic poetry.

== Early life ==
Dragojlo Nikolić, nicknamed Bajo Pivljanin, was born around 1630 in Piva (modern-day northwestern Montenegro), at that time part of the Ottoman Sanjak of Herzegovina. According to oral tradition he was born in the village of Rudinice (in Plužine), while there are two versions as to which family he belonged. According to one tradition, found in Kosta Radović's novel Vrtijeljka (1922), he was born in the village of Rudinice (now in Plužine) in Piva to his father Nikola and his mother Ruža, of the Ruđić brotherhood. Radović claims that he was born on 22 May 1622, while it is estimated that he was born in c. 1630. His godfather, the monk Ivanović, named him Dragojlo, while the nickname Bajo (derived from baja, "snake", a common nickname in Piva which was thought to protect children from evil) was given to him by his grandfather Simo. This version was also mentioned by Blagojević, who stated that Bajo Pivljanin belonged to the Nikolić family in Gornje Rudinice, descending from the old brotherhood of Ruđić. The Ruđić brotherhood from Rudinice, which later dispersed elsewhere, is one of two family trees in Piva from which many Pivan families descend.

According to the priest Toma Lješević (1897), Bajo was the son of Jovan Ivanović and a mother of the Tadić brotherhood; belonging to the Ivanović brotherhood in Donje Rudinice, in a place named after them. This family, as many other families in Piva, either left or was absorbed by other families. In the Ivanovići hamlet of Donje Rudinice, there was a kula (tower house) belonging to Pivljanin; this tower house, and the village church, were later destroyed by the Ottomans after his operations became well known. Pivljanin was an oxen trader, a common occupation in the 17th and 18th centuries, and often exported through Risan market, becoming quite wealthy.

According to the epic poem Sa šta Pivljanin Bajo ode u uskoke collected by Vuk Karadžić, written in the form of a confessional monologue of Pivljanin, he left Piva and became a hajduk (bandit) after he murdered Asan-aga Kopčić, an Ottoman leader in Drobnjaci who had assaulted him. With Limo "Limun" Srdanović from Drobnjaci, another trader whom he met at the start of the Cretan war, he led a band of 30 hajduks.

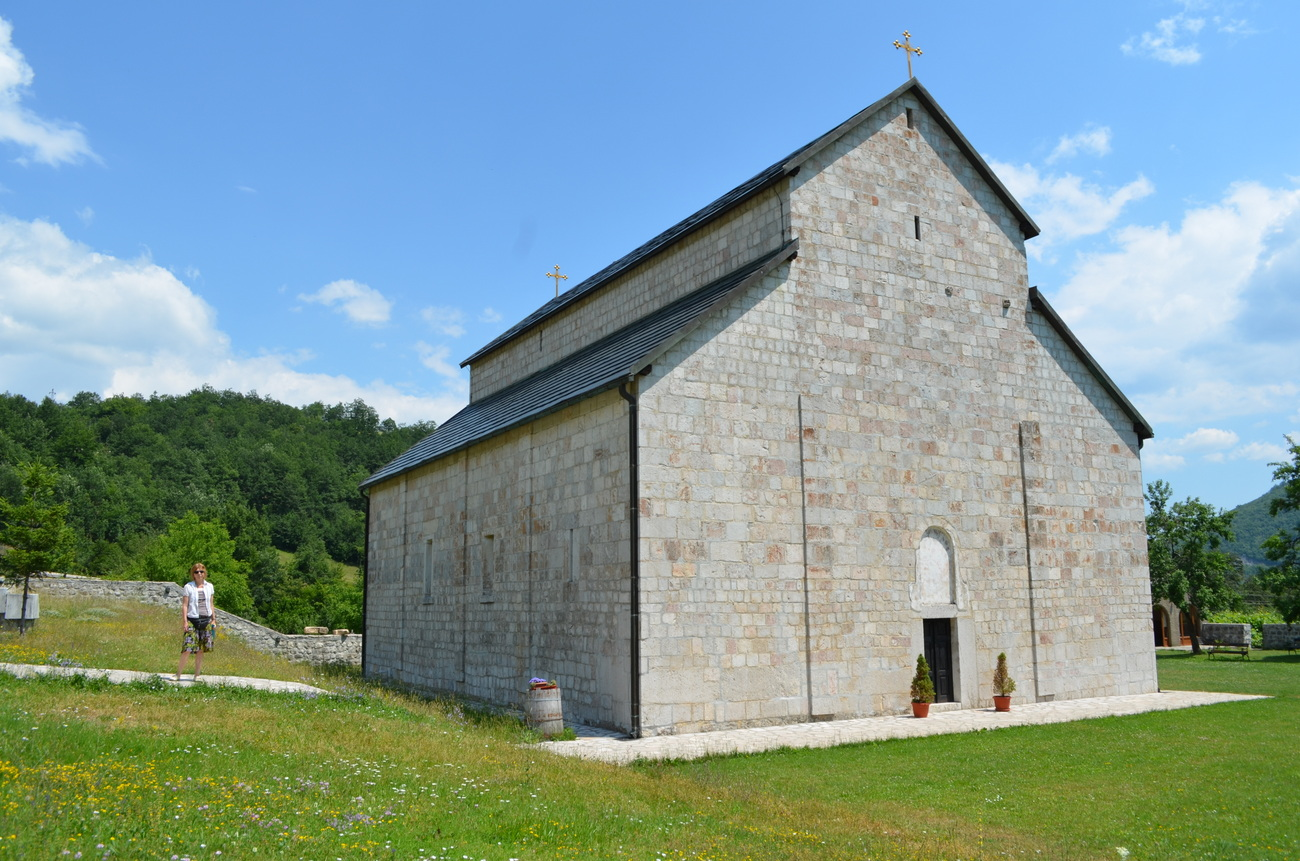
Piva Monastery, which Bajo protected from the Ottoman ravagers. Legend has it that even today the mark of the bullet can be seen, which Bajo fired as a warning above the head of one of the pillagers who was standing in the doorway

== Cretan War ==
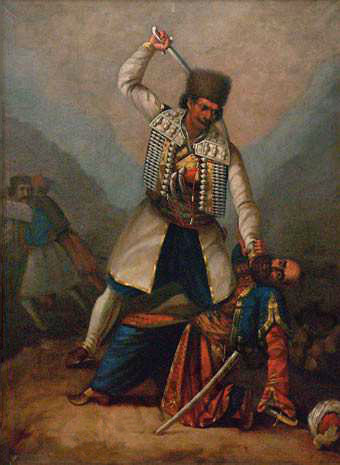
Bajo Pivljanin kills a Turk (1878), by Serbian painter Aksentije Marodić (1838–1909)

The hajduks, who were Ottoman subjects, were recruited by the Republic of Venice as guerilla forces to co-operate in the defence of the Venetian–Ottoman frontier in Dalmatia during the Cretan War (1645–69). They crossed into Venetian territory from which they conducted raids into Ottoman-controlled lands.

Pivljanin was first mentioned in 1654 as one of 1,500 hajduks operating from Venetian territory. During the Cretan War he mostly fought in the southern parts of Dalmatia and Herzegovina, where the population was predominantly anti-Ottoman. Pivljanin was a close friend and favourite of Serbian Orthodox metropolitan (bishop) Vasilije (Basil) Jovanović during the war. He is believed to have begun organizing his own band in c. 1655; according to an epic poem, Pivljanin, Cvjetko Vlastelinović and Đurko Kapetanović established a band which operated in Herzegovina.

The hajduk bands carried out one of their most successful operations in Herzegovina in March 1655, raiding Trebinje, taking many slaves and carrying away considerable loot. This raid was commanded by Terzić from Nikšić, and left Herzegovina through Cavtat (part of the Republic of Ragusa). The raids led to conflict between Ragusa and the Beys of Novi led by Omer-beg Begzadić, whose villages had suffered the most. In February 1656 the hajduk bands broke through Rijeka Dubrovačka into Herzegovina and returned with more loot. In the same year, Pivljanin began to work for the Venetians. After their defeat at Morača in 1649, and the building of the Kolašin fortress (1647–51) by the Ottomans, the Venetians brought offensive operations to a halt. From 1655 to 1657, the Ottomans made several attacks on the Venetian territory around Grbalj. The main hajduk centre became Perast in the Bay of Kotor, which they used as base to raid Ottoman territory. By 1658, the hajduks had mastered Herzegovina to the extent that they "forced taxes on all villages towards Gacko". Taxes were collected by groups of 10–12 hajduks, while disobedience was punished. Pivljanin and his hajduks also operated in Popovo and Romanija. Refugees from Ottoman Herzegovina were gladly accepted into the Republic of Venice. According to the historian Ljubo Mihić, the most distinguished of the hajduks in this period were Pivljanin and Stevo Popović.

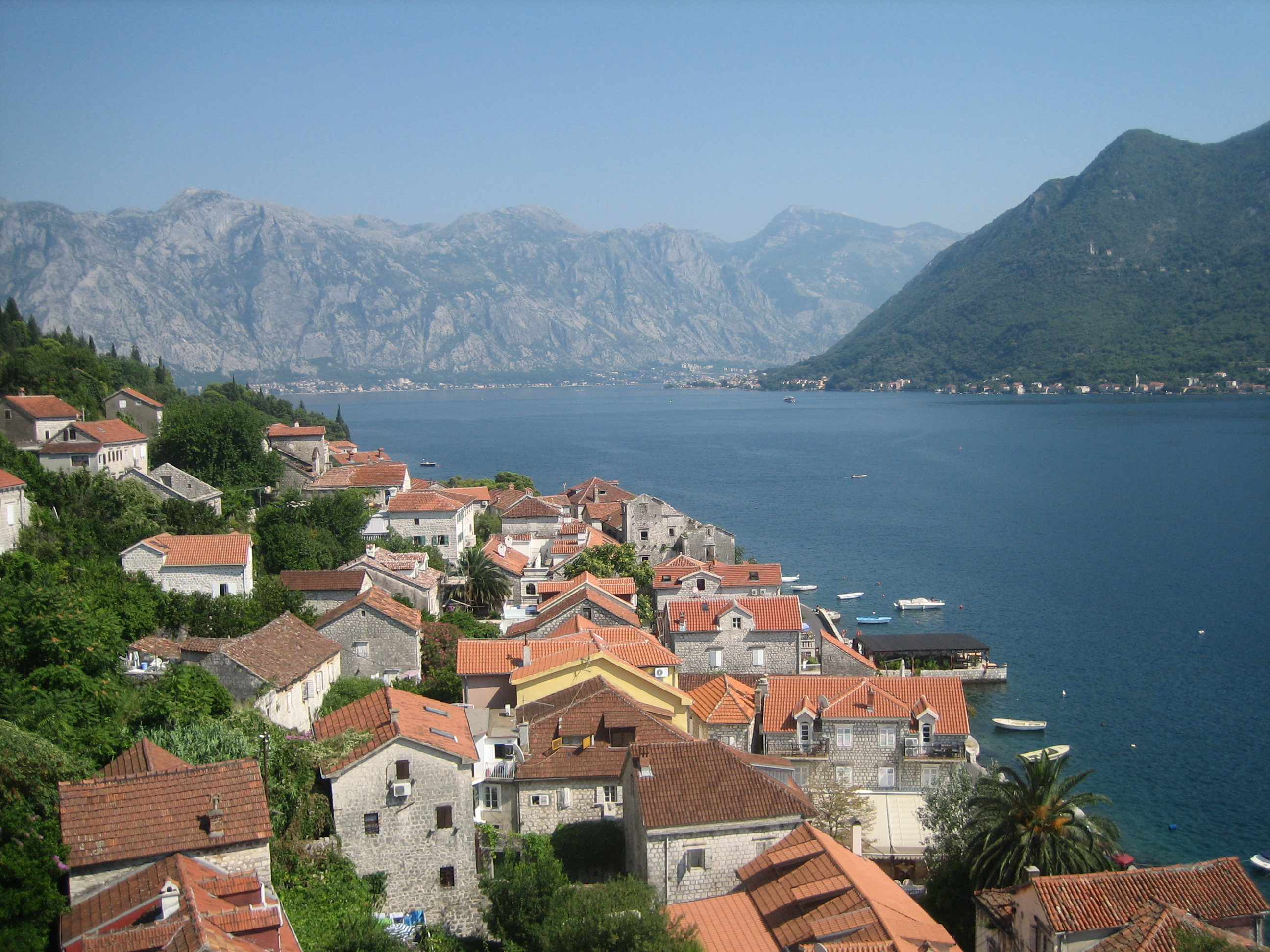
View of the Bay of Kotor from Perast

Pivljanin rose quickly in the hajduk ranks; in 1664 and 1665 he was mentioned simply as "Bajo hajduk" in Ragusan documents, but by 1666 he was referred to as a "buljubaša" (captain), and by 1668 as a "viši (higher) harambaša" (bandit leader).

Pivljanin's tactics included quick raids and destroying bridges as he retreated. For example, the stone bridge on the Tara in Šiplje was destroyed after his band had raided Kolašin. In 1664, Pivljanin is mentioned as a hajduk commander active in the Republic of Ragusa. At the beginning of August 1664, hajduk leaders Stevo and Nikola Popović, Vukosav Puhalović, Pivljanin, Dijete, Čauš, and others, destroyed a merchant caravan on the border with Ragusa, and took 150 cargoes of very expensive goods; Armenian merchants, to whom the goods belonged, complained to the Doge of Venice. The Venetian government warned the hajduks against further provocations of the Ottomans, fearing new attacks from Sohrab Mehmed Pasha, the sanjak-bey of Herzegovina. In ca. 1665, Pivljanin suffered a great defeat by the Ottomans at the village of Grdijevići, losing most of his band and being forced to leave his home region. One hundred and fifty years later, rebels on the Tara used this event, among others, as justification for a revolt. At the beginning of May 1666, Pivljanin raided a Ragusan ship off the coast of Koločep that was bound for Venice with merchandise, unloading eight wagons of wax and freeing captured merchants, among whom were four Turks, in return for a high payment and a written statement that the wax and money had been given to him voluntarily. The Ragusans claimed that at the time of the raid, Pivljanin had shouted that the provveditore (district governor) of Venetian Dalmatia had given him the order to take all that he came across, both on the sea and the land. Five days later, Pivljanin raided a large and unusually rich caravan carrying Venetian merchandise through Ottoman territory. In September 1666, Pivljanin and Mato Njegošević attacked an Ottoman caravan in Mosko then retreated to Banjani.

On 25 March 1669, Pivljanin, living in Stoliv (near Kotor), was recorded in Kotor as having acknowledged a debt of 62.5 real (40 groschen being 1 real) to Gierolamo Cazalieri. In early April 1669 Pivljanin and Puhalović raised and looted in Herzegovina, and retreated towards Šipan. According to legend, he burnt down a mosque in Nevesinje, and another one in Počitelj. There are accounts recorded by the anthropologist Jevto Dedijer that several Muslim families left their homes after cruel treatment by Pivljanin; the Šehović left Korjenići and moved to south Herzegovina after he and Limun burnt down their house; the Kajtaz and Rorić left Nevesinje and moved to Mostar, and a large number of the families of Slivlja left their homes. The war ended with Ottoman victory in 1669, with Venice being forced to relinquish all of the territory taken over by the uskoks and hajduks during the war, with only Klis becoming a new Venetian possession. The Venetian–Ottoman border delineation act was signed on 30 October 1671.

== Inter-war period ==
After the war, the southeastern Venetian possessions (the Bay of Kotor) were destituted. War, hunger and frequent epidemics had decreased the population. As soon as the peace had been signed, the uskoks and hajduks became a nuisance to Venice; up until then frontiersmen defending Dalmatia and the Bay of Kotor from Ottoman invasion, they were now a potential cause to new conflicts with the Ottomans, which Venice wanted to avoid. The hajduks were accustomed to living on war booty, thus they had a hard time coping with peacetime. The provveditore generale Antonio Priuli, who was very favourable towards the frontiersmen, called uskok and hajduk leaders to Zadar to discuss ways to "create conditions for a normal life".

In December 1669 Antonio Priuli brought from Perast to Venice hajduk leaders including Bajo Pivljanin, Grujica Žeravica, Vukosav Puhalović and buljubaša Milošević. Earlier, in June, the Venetian provveditore issued the termination of duty of the "chiefs that protect the Kotor area", the first three mentioned, and had them included in the list of soldiers having the right of pay and bread. Pivljanin's bravery and sacrifice to the Republic of Venice is especially outlined. The four leaders asked the Doge if the hajduks could be granted Vrana in Ravni Kotari or Risan in the Bay of Kotor as a district for them to settle, and benefits already given to Paštrovići, Grbalj and Perast, due, among other issues, to the fact that "the number of hajduks that fled to the Perast area in 1654 had risen to 1,500, of whom 500 were militarily able, and now, in peacetime, their livelihood was under threat". The issue was finally settled after several months with the arrival of Antonio Barbaro as the new generale provveditore.

In 1670, Barbaro decided that the hajduks would be permitted to settle in Risan and a number of neighbouring villages. Soon after the decision was made, the hajduks and frontier Ottomans came into conflict, resulting in many Ottoman casualties. The Ottoman government then demanded that the Venetian official (bailo) in Constantinople remove the hajduks from Risan. The Venetian government decided to move the hajduks of the Bay of Kotor to Istria on the northern Adriatic coast. Colonisation began in May 1671, with the Venetian captain in charge of Istria being informed of the pending arrival of 1,300 hajduks. By the beginning of June 1671, all hajduks from Risan had been transported by sea to Istria. Istria had been depopulated by epidemics and the Uskok War (1615–18); and it therefore made sense to relocate the hajduks to eliminate the frontier clashes between the hajduks and Ottomans, which were disturbing the peace between Venice and the Ottoman Empire. The Venetians also wanted to repopulate Istria, so the Venetian Senate made the decision to resettle the hajduks there. Barbaro guaranteed the hajduks tax exemptions and appropriations, the appointment of four judges to mediate their disputes, and the allocation of livestock and agricultural tools. Apart from Puljština in southern Istria, the hajduks requested grants of land on the Buzet karst. Friction between the hajduks and Venetians was evident in the negotiations between the hajduk leaders and captain Lunardo Mercella; as a significant part of the promised benefits were not forthcoming, four hajduk representatives – Nikola Popović, buljubaša Milošević, Pivljanin and Petar Babić – appealed directly to the Doge of Venice to confirm Barbaro's chapters. Barbaro calmed the hajduks down by regulating their status. The Venetian government initially sought to disperse the hajduks across the Venetian–Ottoman frontier in order to prevent conflict with other Venetian subjects, but they were temporarily settled at Pula in Istria.

In the summer of 1671 a malaria epidemic broke out, leading to additional complications. The epidemic was devastating to numerous hajduk families, the natives being more resistant to malaria; thus, part of the settlers moved to Ližnjan and Premantura, while others left to return to Dalmatia. Pivljanin and Njegošević lived in Premantura. In 1673, Pivljanin and his followers included 34 households, 18 of which lived in towns; 8 in Premantura (Promontore), 8 in Mutvoran (Momorano) and one in Peroj (Peroi); his followers consisted of a total of 157 individuals, 89 adults and 68 minors, 75 males and 82 females.

Financial aid and incentives did not deliver the expected results for the hajduks, as they did not wish to settle in the assigned lands. Conflicts ensued between the hajduks and local people in Puljština, with kidnappings, hajduk attacks on fishermen and boats, and also revenge killings. The hajduks were enraged, and could not cope with the Istrian climate. Many of them moved to Senj, where the Uskoks were still active. During this time, Pivljanin and Njegošević were the most active in moving hajduks into the Habsburg monarchy, and they travelled to Karlovac to negotiate. Some hajduks independently returned to the Bay of Kotor, where the provveditore of Kotor put some on galleys, imprisoned some at Klis, and exiled some, after killing others using old convictions as a pretext. When harambaša Njegošević was persecuted, the hajduks again sent Pivljanin to Venice as their envoy. In his plea to the Doge of Venice, dated 27 March 1673, Pivljanin asked that the persecution of hajduks cease, stating that they had all been pardoned by an amnesty issued by Barbaro. The request was partly met, and some hajduks were freed.

Pivljanin, Jovo Sikimić, and Njegošević settled Zadar in 1674, where they "came into contact with Serb leaders of the [Ravni] kotari uskoks (rebels)", but many hajduks remained in Istria. During 1675 the issues in Istria decreased, and by the next year, as more hajduks left the area, there are no further records regarding hajduks in Istria. While in Zadar, Pivljanin befriended Stojan Janković, a veteran hajduk from Ravni Kotari, who had been active in Dalmatia during the Cretan War. On 17 January 1675, Pivljanin's brother Dimitrije married Ana (Anna Giacovichi, also called Anka and Janja), Stojan Janković's sister. In a letter to the Venetian government dated 3 December 1675, Pivljanin offered to receive and hold the goods of Omer Mustafa Čehajić, which were part of a dispute with Vučić Kajić, and suggested Stojan Janković as a guarantor. On 5 February 1676, the birth of Pivljanin's son Simeon by his wife Manda was registered in the Orthodox parish. According to the historian M. Jačov, Pivljanin's wife was another sister of Stojan Janković. The godmother of Pivljanin's son Simeon was Mato Njegošević's wife Ana. Dimitrije's baby son Nikola was baptized on 1 October 1677. On 3 May 1680, provveditore G. Cornaro prohibited some Venetian subjects to cause damage to the meadow in Suhovare rented by Pivljanin from Turks. On 9 January 1680, Dimitrije's wife Ana fell and broke her neck, being 25 years old at the time of death.

After the Ottoman failure at the Battle of Vienna (11–12 September 1683), the people of Ravni Kotari and Kninska Krajina assembled under the leadership of Stojan's brother Ilija Janković and attacked the Ottomans. Pivljanin and his brother joined the band. The Venetians, in order to avoid a war, recalled Stojan Janković to Venice in October, calming Ilija, who is described as very restless and unmanageable. Dalmatian provveditore Lorenzo Dona sent colonel Ivan Radoš to the hajduks to calm them down and return them home. Radoš informed Dona on 10 November 1683 that he had met with Pivljanin, Vid Kalinić and Andrija Gilim at Kula Atlagića, who asked him to forward their request of forgiveness to the provveditore, then summoned Ilija Janković and Jovan Baljak. They all promised to follow Dona's command and stop hostility against Ottomans. When the hajduks calmed down – by which time much of northern Dalmatia was in their hands – the Venetians returned Stojan to Ravni Kotari in December. In a letter dated 8 December 1683, provveditore Dona forgave Pivljanin for desertion, and ordered his return in the list of cavalry bands which he had been part of, and gave him back wages for the intervening time.

Venice entered into an alliance with Austria and declared war on the Ottomans in the spring of 1684. When hostilities began, Pivljanin was again in active Venetian service, finally returning to the Bay of Kotor.

== Morean War ==
=== Return to service ===
Between January and the end of April 1684, the Republic of Venice accepted 4,200 families as settlers on the Venetian–Ottoman frontier, including 20,000 warriors. The Venetians provided them with food and 1,800 rifles, and their leaders were given monthly pay. The families were settled in the territory of Zadar and Šibenik, and around Klis. Pivljanin and his brother Dimitrije served in the cavalry bands in Zadar until Antonio Zeno, the extraordinary provveditore of Kotor, requested that they be sent for service in the Bay of Kotor. This was approved by Lorenzo Donà, the provveditore of Dalmatia, on 12 April 1684. In September 1684 Pivljanin was documented as having been with his band in Herceg Novi, and in October in the area of Livno. The Venetian Senate thanked Pivljanin and Jovan Sikimić for their victory at Jezero, and approved Zeno's decision to reward them medals and sequins, on 12 October 1684. Marino Mikiel, a Venetian commissary, writing of the state of the Venetian cavalry in Dalmatia on 26 January 1685, highlighted that Stojan Janković and Pivljanin received the wages of cavalry soldiers due to their merit and by grace of the state, without having to effectively serve as soldiers. In March 1685 Pivljanin informed the Venetian extraordinary provveditore about his band's operations in the territory of the Republic of Ragusa; his band numbered 130 fighters and had three harambašas: Miho Kolumbara; Miloš Lepirić; and Božo Lučić. In February, they had captured a caravan with wheat in Zupci, stolen some cattle and burnt down the village of Glavska, attacked Cavtat and returned to Trebinje.

=== Battle of Vrtijeljka ===
Süleyman, the Ottoman sanjak-bey of Scutari sent word to the Montenegrin people that, "due to their relations with Morlachs (Venetian irregular troops) and hajduks", he would exterminate them all. Historiography is divided as to whether the Montenegrins really betrayed the hajduks in the ensuing battle; some believe that in order to avoid retaliation, the Montenegrins promised the head of Pivljanin, then betrayed the hajduks on the battlefield. The Ottoman forces under Süleyman approached Cetinje, and the two forces met at the hill of Vrtijeljka on 7 May 1685.

The hajduk force consisted of c. 1200 fighters, including also Montenegrins, Mainjani and Primorci, commanded by over-intendant Bošković, harambaša Pivljanin, and the guvernadur of Grbalj. The large Ottoman force crossed the Morača and headed towards Cetinje. The hajduks carried a war flag with Venetian symbols. The hajduks were defeated by the Ottomans, and Pivljanin was killed in battle. Süleyman had Pivljanin's head sent to the Ottoman Sultan, Mehmed IV, as a great war trophy. The importance of the battle is evident in the fact that the heads of Pivljanin and his hajduks decorated the entrance hall of the seraglio in Constantinople, and that Süleyman was elevated to pasha following the victory. The severed heads were taken to Constantinople as proof of finishing the task and that the enemy was triumphally defeated. Only heads of worthy, more prominent outlaws, of names and work that was well-known, had this treatment. Heads of hajduks were otherwise put on town palisades or on poles beside the road or crossroads. The fact that multiple other hajduk heads were sent to Constantinople along with Pivljanin's could primarily be explained as that the Ottomans wanted to visibly display the defeat of a notable movement, which had brought much grief to them. The news of the battle was recorded in Rome on 27 May 1685, in this way: "two courageous leaders, one named Bajo, friend of captain Janko, and the other, captain Vuković the Arbanas, died"; the source states that the defeat was due to a betrayal by Montenegrins in the battle.

=== Aftermath ===
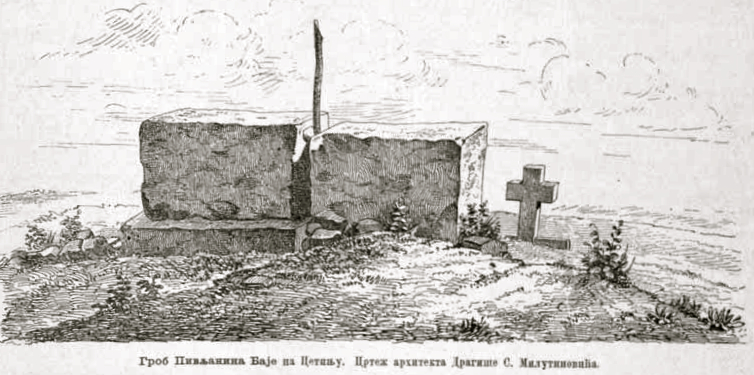
Drawing of the tombs where Bajo Pivljanin and his wife are allegedly buried in Cetinje (1881)

Pivljanin's importance is evident in Antonio Zeno's evaluation: "since the death of harambaša Bajo, the frontier is left without leaders able to control the hajduks bands". It has been claimed that Pivljanin was buried by the Vlah Church in Cetinje. In 1685, Pivljanin's brother Dimitrije, on behalf of Pivljanin's widow and two sons, requested that Pivljanin's pay be transferred to one of the sons. The request highlighted that Pivljanin had left his home in Herzegovina to fight for the Republic of Venice, to whom he had great value as a fighter.

It was decided on 20 September 1689 that his brother Dimitrije and two sons be admitted into the Venetian cavalry. Mentioning Pivljanin as having "proved himself worthy", dealt "damage to the Turks", and suffered "many received wounds", the decision was made to carry out an earlier plan that Pivljanin's sons be admitted into the cavalry. As Pivljanin had died, his brother Dimitrije, who had "given proofs of righteousness and loyalty on several occasions", and his two mature sons, Vuk and Sima (Simeun), were admitted into the band of Soliman in Herceg Novi, "thus, every one of them received wages of a soldier in the cavalry".

== Legacy ==
There are many epic poems and stories about his life. Metropolitan Petar II Petrović-Njegoš included a eulogy to him in The Mountain Wreath (1847). Serbian Orthodox priest and historian Ilarion Ruvarac (1832–1905) called him a "glorious knight".

The village of Bajovo Polje ("Bajo's field") was named after Bajo Pivljanin, it is said, after he killed his first Turk at the field. The poet Vukašin Gagović used the alias Bajo Pivljanin. A Yugoslav Partisan battalion was named after him. There are streets in cities and towns in former Yugoslavia named after him, as well as a Montenegrin futsal club, KMF Bajo Pivljanin.

There are several brotherhoods and families that claim ancestry or kinship with him or his brothers. The Bajovići, having the slava (patron saint day) of St. Nicholas, with tens of houses in Bezuje, and one house in their original village of Rudinice (1971), have several versions of their origin: the first that they descend from a brother of Bajo Pivljanin; the second, from a villager called Čepur that took over Bajo Pivljanin's estate after the family left; the third, that the Bajovići who were really called Čepuri until 1887 descend from a branch of a family tree also including the Vračari and Taušani, closely related to the Gagovići, in line with their slava in common. Based on the presumed connection with Pivljanin, King Nikola I accepted member Đorđija Bajović into officer school. When S. Tomić did field research in Piva in 1912–13 and 1924, however, he recorded the Bajovići, called Čepuri in Gornje Rudinice with two houses, as hailing from Bajovo Polje and being direct descendants of Bajo Nikolić Pivljanin. Meanwhile, Tomić had recorded four or six houses of Bajovići in Bezuje that belonged to the Vračari brotherhood, itself descending from the Gagovići brotherhood.

Other families claiming descent from his nephews are spread through Stara Raška and Šumadija in Serbia. There was a tale that Pivljanin put a curse on his family after seven of his brothers and cousins declined to join him in the hajduks. The Markovići brotherhood in Ljuljaci, Serbia, with the slava of St. John, settled in the first half of the 18th century, descending from one of Pivljanin's children. The Bajić brotherhood in Takovo, with the slava of St. George, numbering 30 households in 1960, also claim descent from him.

=== Epic poetry ===
The Cretan War is considered an "epical period of Serb history". Vuk Karadžić (1787–1864), the Serbian philologist and linguist, recorded several poems which mention Pivljanin which he published in his folklore collections. The poems fall into what is known as the "hajduk epic cycle".

- Bajo Pivljanin i beg Ljubović, ("Bajo Pivljanin and Bey Ljubović", best known poem about him, recounting his victory in duel with Ljubović bey in Nevesinje, and his killing of Mato Njegošević who betrayed him).
- Šta čini osveta, ("What does vengeance does", recounting how Bajo and Limun justifiably aid Tašo Nikolić from Vasojevići in avenging the betrayal done by his brother-in-law Knez Ivaniš).
- Sa šta Pivljanin Bajo ode u uskoke ("Why did Pivljanin Bajo became an uskok", recounting the early episode in his life when he killed Hasan-Aga Kopčić).
- Bajo Pivljanin i Ale Novljanin, ("Bajo Pivljanin and Ale from Novi", same topic as "Bajo Pivljanin and Pasha of Zagorje", but with different characters).
- Pivljanin Bajo i Ferat kapetan, ("Bajo Pivljanin and captain Ferhat", Bajo retaking the flock of sheep abducted by Muslim captain Ferhat somewhere around Golija mountain, losing one of his best men in the process).
- Bajo Pivljanin i Marić alajbeg
- Bajo Pivljanin i paša od Zagorja ("Bajo Pivljanin and Pasha of Zagorje", recounts how Bajo and Limun assaulted the wedding of Hadžija Rizvanbegović from Risan in Korita for tricking them, and killing his bride, the daughter of Čengić Pasha of Zagorje, in the process. The other version of the song is known as Rišnjanjin Hadžija i Limun trgovac ("Hadžija from Risan and Limun the trader")).
- Hamza Mijatović i Pivljanin Bajo ("Hamza Mijatović and Pivljanin Bajo")
- Zulum bez Baja
- Ženidba Grbljičića Zana ("The wedding of Zane Grbičić")
- Boj na Vrtijeljci ("Battle of Vrtijeljka")
- Do tri harambaše

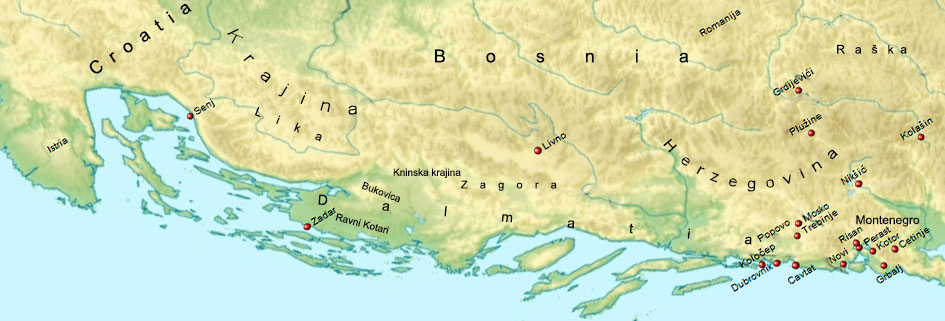
Map of locations related to Bajo Pivljanin's life

== Annotations ==
1. In Italian (Venetian) documents, his name is predominantly spelt "Baio Nicolich" (Bajo Nikolić). Documents often name him "Carambassà Baio" (Harambaša Bajo, Bajo the Harambaša), and after 1683, simply "Baio" (Bajo). Only once is the informal "Baio Piuglianin" (Bajo Pivljanin) found, while "Nicolo da Piva" is found as an alternate name (carambassa Baio Nikolich, quondam Nicolo da Piva). He is known in historiography as "Bajo Pivljanin" (Bajo from Piva, Bajo the Pivan). His real given name was Dragojlo, while Nikolić is a patronymic. In Serbian epic poetry he is also called "Soko Bajo" (Bajo the Falcon).
2. In the Ottoman Empire, the term hajduk was used for Balkan bandits, brigands, while for the South Slavs it was used for bandits who protected Christians against Ottoman oppression. In the 17th century, the concept was firmly established in the Ottoman Balkans, related to increased taxes, Christian victories against the Ottomans, and general security decline. Hajduk bands predominantly numbered 100 men each, with a firm hierarchy under one leader. They targeted Ottoman representatives and rich people, mainly Muslims, for plunder or punishment to oppressive Ottomans, or revenge.
3. Bajo Pivljanin was a near friend and favourite of Serbian Orthodox metropolitan Vasilije (Basil) Jovanović. Bajo frequently visited the Ostrog monastery, which Vasilije had founded and lived in, a safe haven for hajduks. Vasilije is known to have greatly helped Bajo and his band. Bajo often came to the Nikšić area, and after his plunderings retreated to the monastery. Vasilije had sought help from the popes several times during and after the Cretan War regarding Ottoman reprisals on the population. The pair is regarded instrumental in that period's protection of Serbs from Ottoman cruelty, regarded Serb heroes. Vasilije (d. 1671) was proclaimed a saint by the Serbian Orthodox Church.
4. In Serbia: Belgrade (map), Novi Sad (map), and Subotica (map); Montenegro: Podgorica (map), Cetinje (map) and Nikšić (map); Bosnia and Herzegovina: Banja Luka (map) and Bijeljina (map).

== Sources ==
Books

- Blagojević, Obren (1971). "Пива" [Piva]. Editions Speciales. 443. SANU.
- Ćorović, Vladimir (2006). Историја Срба [History of the Serbs]. Дом и школа. ISBN 9788683751303.
- Dedijer, Jevto (1991). Hercegovina: antropogeografske studije [Herzegovina: anthropo-geographical studies]. Veselin Masleša. ISBN 9788621004508.
- Desnica, Boško (1950). Istorija Kotarskih uskoka [History of Kotari Uskoks]. Vol. 1. Naučna knjiga.
- Jačov, Marko (1990). Srbi u mletačko-turskim ratovima u XVII veku [Serbs in Venetian-Ottoman Wars in the 17th century]. Sveti arhijerejski sinod Srpske pravoslavne crkve. pp. 1, 60–61, 65–67, 69–70, 122.
- Kalezić, Dimitrije M. (2002). A – Z. Savremena administracija. ISBN 9788638706716.
- Kostić, Lazo M. (1970). Stogodišnjica I Krivošijskog ustanka, 1869–1969: istorijska i pravna rasprava [Centenary of the First Krivošije Uprising, 1869–1969: historical and legal discussion]. Iskra.
- Mihić, Ljubo (1975). Ljubinje sa okolinom [Ljubinje and the environ]. Dragan Srnic. pp. 181–188.
- Samardžić, Radovan; Veselinović, Rajko L.; Popović, Toma (1993). Radovan Samardžić (ed.). Istorija srpskog naroda: Srbi pod tuđinskom vlašću 1537–1699 [History of the Serb people: Serbs under foreign rule 1537–1699]. Belgrade: Srpska književna zadruga.
- Tomić, Svetozar (1949) [1946]. Piva i Pivljani [Piva and Pivans]. SAN.
- Paunović, Marinko (1998). Srbi: biografije znamenitih: A-Š [Serbs: biographies of notables: A-Š]. Emka. p. 173. ISBN 9788685205040.

Journals

- Berber, S. (2004). "Историјски подаци о ускочком сердару Стојану Јанковићу" [Historical data about Uskok serdar Stojan Janković] (PDF). Norma. 10 (1–2): 151–161.
- Bojović, Zlata (2008). Књижевност и стварност: Научни састанак слависта у Вукове дане, 12–15, IX 2007 [Literature and reality: Scientific meeting of Slavists on Vuk's Days, 12–15.09.2007]. Vol. 37. Belgrade: Међународни славистички центар.
- Etnografski institut (1926). Srpski etnografski zbornik [Serbian ethnographical journal]. Vol. 39. SKA.
- Filološki fakultet (1956). "Prilozi za književnost, jezik, istoriju i folklor" [Contributions on literature, language, history and folklore]. 22–23. Државна штампарија: 267.
- Filološki fakultet (1974). "Prilozi za književnost, jezik, istoriju i folklor" [Contributions on literature, language, history and folklore]. 40–41. Државна штампарија.
- Leković, Žarko (2007). "Bajo Pivljanin – prilozi za biografiju". Istorijski zapisi [Historical records]. Vol. 80. Istorijski institut Crne Gore. pp. 247–255.
- Paronić, S. (2012). "Osvrt: Miroslav Bertoša, Doba nasilja, doba straha: vojnici-pljačkaši, seljaci-razbojnici i doseljenici-nasilnici u Istri XVII. i XVIII. stoljeća" [Review: Miroslav Bertoša, Era of violence, era of fear: soldiers-robbers, villagers-rebels and settlers-bullies in Istria in the 17th and 18th century]. Vjesnik Istarskog Arhiva (19). Državni arhiv u Pazinu.
- Suvajdžić, Boško (2008). Bojović, Zlata (ed.). "Bajo Pivljanin u usmenoj poeziji" [Bajo Pivljanin in oral poetry]. Књижевност и стварност: Научни састанак слависта у Вукове дане, 12–15, IX, 2007. 37 (2). Belgrade: Међународни славистички центар: 140–152.
- Vujović, Dimo (1988). Hajduci u Boki Kotorskoj, 1648–1718 [Hajduks in the Bay of Kotor, 1648–1718]. Crnogorska akademija nauka i umjetnosti. ISBN 9788672150148.
