= Danilo I, Metropolitan of Cetinje =

Metropolitan of Cetinje from 1697–1735

Danilo I
- Metropolitan of Cetinje
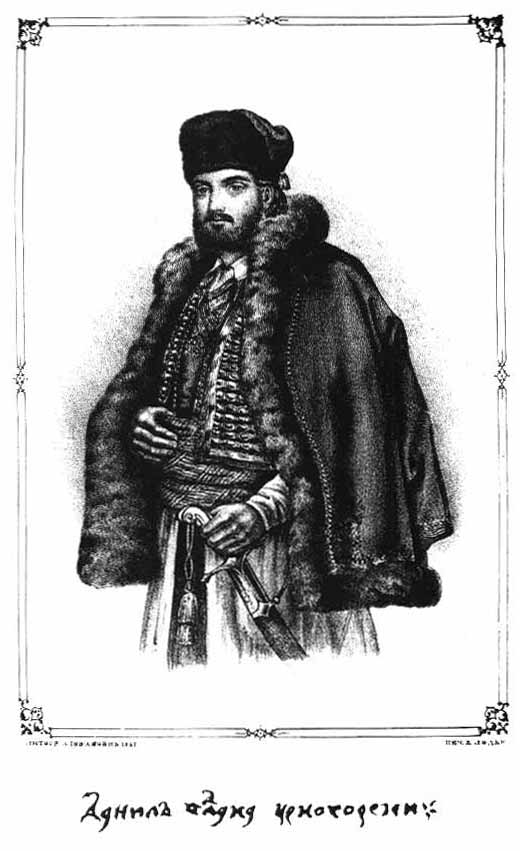
- Romanticized illustration from The Mountain Wreath, 1847
- Native name: Данило I
- Church: Serbian Orthodox Church
- See: Skenderija and Primorje
- Elected: 1697
- In office: 1697–1735
- Predecessor: Savatije
- Successor: Sava Petrović

Orders
- Ordination: June 1700 by Arsenije III Crnojević

Personal details
- Born: 1670 Njeguši, Prince-Bishopric of Montenegro
- Died: 11 January 1735 (aged 64–65) Podmaine monastery, Republic of Venice
- Buried: Orlov krš (Eagle's Rock), Cetinje
- Residence: Cetinje
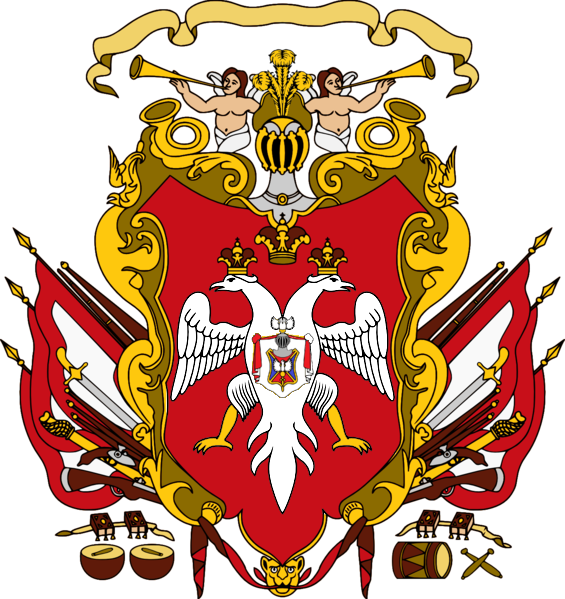
- Coat of arms

Danilo I Petrović-Njegoš (Serbian Cyrillic: Данило I Петровић-Његош; 1670 – 11 January 1735) was the Metropolitan of Cetinje between 1697 and 1735, the first de facto vladika of Montenegro, and the founder of the House of Petrović-Njegoš—which ruled Montenegro from 1697 to 1918. He restored the Cetinje Monastery and initiated the struggle for the liberation of Montenegro from Ottoman rule.

He was also known by the patronymic Danilo Šćepčević.

== Early life and background ==
Danilo Šćepčević (Note: He is also known in literature and historiography as Danilo Petrović. He was known by the patronymic surname Šćepčev or Šćepčević, while Petrović (Петровић) was used in the family only later; he never called himself Petrović–it was first used by his nephews Sava and Vasilije, after a progenitor of the Petrović-Njegoš, Radul, known by his monastic name Petar, or after their father, Petar. He signed himself Danilo Šćepčev Heraković Njeguš (Данило Шћепчев Хераковић Његуш).) was born in Njeguši, the son of Stepan or Šćepan Kaluđerović, a merchant, and Ana, who later became a nun. He had a brother, Radul, known as Rade Šćepčev. His paternal family belonged to the Heraković brotherhood.

Danilo Šćepčević was only 13 years old when the Great Turkish War began in 1683. As a fifteen-year-old, he was a witness to the battle of Vrtijeljka (1685) during the Morean War. It is possible that he heard the details of the battle from some survivor. He mentioned "noble and famous hajduks who fell at Vrtijeljka" in a letter to the Montenegrin chiefs dated to 1714.

After the death of Sava Očinić, the Metropolitan of Cetinje, in 1697, there was turmoil surrounding the election of a new metropolitan when riots arose because of it.

== Chirotony ==
In 1697, the Montenegrin tribal assembly chose the monk of Cetinje, Danilo Šćepčević as the head of the Serbian Orthodox Metropolitanate of Cetinje, following the Great Migrations of the Serbs which left the seat of the Serbian Church to Phanariote Greeks who were closely associated with the Porte. Kalinik I of Skoplje was appointed by the Ottomans to become the new Serbian Patriarch of Peć. The Bishop of Kotor, Marin Drago, made a similar effort and attempted to use this opportunity to weaken the influence of the metropolitan and to share the influence of Catholicism in the Primorje. Danilo was, as other Serbian bishops, unwilling to subordinate himself to Kalinik.

Danilo's deep patriotism and loyalty to the heritage of the Serbian Church can best be seen in the fact that he did not want to be consecrated as a metropolitan by Kalinik, who sat in Peć, geographically closer to him. Instead, in 1700, he chose not to attend an assembly dedicated to Kalinik in Peć, but instead went to Dunaszekcső (Sečuj), in Habsburg Hungary, at the assembly of the Serbian Patriarch in exile, Arsenije III Crnojević.

Danilo was chirotonized by Arsenije III Crnojević as the bishop of Cetinje and Metropolitan of Skenderija and Primorje. The chirotony, which took place during the national church assembly, was participated in by Serbian metropolitans from all over the Serbian lands, as well as other notable Serbs. The following individuals took part in the consecration: Savatije III Ljubibratić of Zahumlje, Stefan of Srem, Jeftimije Drobnjak of Bačka, Isaija of Ineu, Spiridon Štibica of Vršac, and Gerasim of Zvornik. It is likely that Danilo had met Arsenije III earlier when Arsenije was in Cetinje in 1689, asking the Montenegrins to take up arms and unite to organize a fight against the Ottomans. During the consecration, Danilo's jurisdiction was established. The following places are mentioned in the document were: Montenegro, Grbalj, Paštrovići, Krtoli, Luštica, Bar, Skadar, Ulcinj, Podgorica, Žabljak, Zeta, Kuči, Vasojevići, Bratonožići, Bjelopavlići and Piperi. Then the Patriarch appointed Metropolitan Savatije III as his exarch, who usually stayed in the vicinity of Herceg Novi.

== Tenure ==
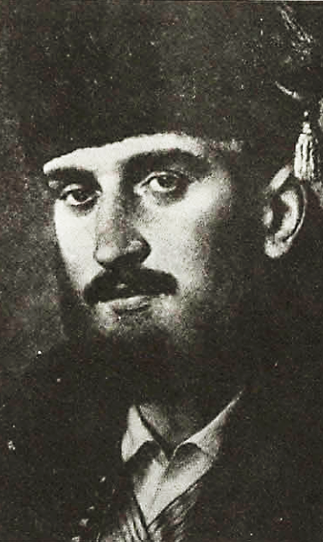
A rare portrait of metropolitan Danilo Petrović Njegoš, found in Sava Vuković's book, Serbian Hierarchs.

From Danilo's arrival at the metropolitan position, constant battles with the Turks would begin, which would not subside for the next two centuries. Compared to previous metropolitans, Danilo would have a much greater reputation among the people, which would be connected not only with his personality but also with many circumstances. During his time, the cooperation of Montenegrins with the Venetian Republic, which had been in constant decline in the 18th century, would end. Danilo's period would also represent the beginning of a new era of Montenegrin history. Ties with Russia would be established, in which Montenegro, as a Slavic and Orthodox state, would find a secure foothold, unlike the Venetian Republic, which, as a Roman Catholic and non-Slavic state, only used Montenegrins to fight against the Ottomans.

The Bishop of Kotor, Marin Drago, wrote about Danilo, "He is aggressive, and if the world's authorities do not stand in his way, Catholicism in the remote regions of his diocese will be in great danger. The Bishop of Cetinje descends from Cetinje to the Kotor diocese every year, and, in addition to the Orthodox, he taxes Catholics as well." Danilo considered himself not only the successor of the Cetinje metropolitans from the time of the fall of Zeta to the Turks but also the successor of Ivan Crnojević, and he signed himself in one of his charters as "Danil[o], voj[e]vod[ič] srpskoj zemlji," which translates to, "Danilo, voivode of Serbian land."

He coordinated defense operations and partially settled tribal disputes among his people. An uprising broke out in 1711, after calls by Danilo, where the Montenegrins fought alongside Highlanders and Herzegovinians against local Ottomans.

During Danilo's rule, political ties between Russia and Montenegro were first established. Russian historian Pavel Rovinsky, in writing about Montenegrin-Russian relations, concluded that it was the pretensions of Turkey and Austria (and at times the Republic of Venice) that turned Montenegro to Russia. Having nowhere to turn in the struggle for the survival of their people, the leading spirits of the Serb land of Montenegro turned to the past, to their mythical origins—to the ancient homeland of the Slavs—all the more readily because it was not only a Great Power but an increasingly powerful factor as a counter-Turkish and counter-Austrian force.

In 1712, the Turks attacked Montenegro with strong forces under the command of Ahmet Pasha. In the battle of Carev Laz, (Note: There is a lot of controversy among scholars regarding this year, especially regarding the battle of Carev Laz. The controversy mainly revolves around whether this battle even took place and whether the Montenegrin army clashed with the entire Turkish army in it or only with its advance guard. In all likelihood, it was the latter.) the Montenegrin army was commanded by Metropolitan Danilo, and he was wounded in it. The losses of the Turks were great. Despite this victory, the Montenegrins were unable to stop the Turks, who entered Cetinje at the end of August, but due to difficult natural conditions, difficulties in supplying supplies, and constant harassment of the Montenegrins, they were unable to stay there, and they withdrew with heavy losses.

To avoid capture, Metropolitan Danilo, with the Russian envoy Miloradović and 500 Montenegrins, fled to Herzegovina through Venetian territory. Montenegro suffered an even more fierce attack in 1714, when Numan Pasha Ćuprilić attacked it with an even stronger army. He managed to enter Cetinje and burn the monastery. Turkish forces cruised the Montenegrin hills and captured the weak, who were then taken into slavery. A large number of houses were burned, and this campaign is considered the worst for Montenegro in its history. Metropolitan Danilo again fled to Venetian territory, and then went to Russia. From there he returned with two letters from Tsar Peter the Great. According to the first letter, the Tsar obliged the Montenegrins to help Russia in the event of a Russian-Turkish war, because Montenegrins and Russians were the same "in one faith and one language". According to the second letter, the Tsar granted aid to the Cetinje Monastery in the amount of 500 rubles per year.

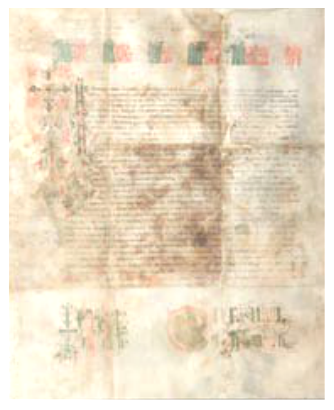
Gramata—decree of blessing—from Peter the Great, which was sent to the Montenegrins in 1711.

Danilo had this message for the Montenegrin common council (zbor) and its tribal chiefs in 1714:

My death would be graceful if you would want to all unite and perish honourably and gloriously, as was done by Prince Lazar and Miloš Obilić who slew the Sultan on Kosovo, and finally fell with his master and all 7,000 fighters – which led us Montenegrins to this rubble – leaving after themselves glory and honour.

In 1715, Danilo visited Tsar Peter I at St. Petersburg and secured his alliance against the Ottomans—a journey that became traditional among his successors in Montenegro and in all the Serbian lands elsewhere in the Balkans. He subsequently recovered Zeta from the Ottomans, restored the monastery at Cetinje, and erected defenses around Podmaine Monastery in Budva, which was rebuilt in 1630 and served as a summer residence of the ruling family of Montenegro.

Upon his return from Russia in April 1716, Danilo settled in Maine near Budva on Venetian territory. He found Montenegro in a difficult state, and writing to the Russian Chancellor Golofkin, he stated:

Everything was destroyed, dispersed and handed over to the sword, taken into slavery: and a small remnant remained in the mountains and saved themselves.

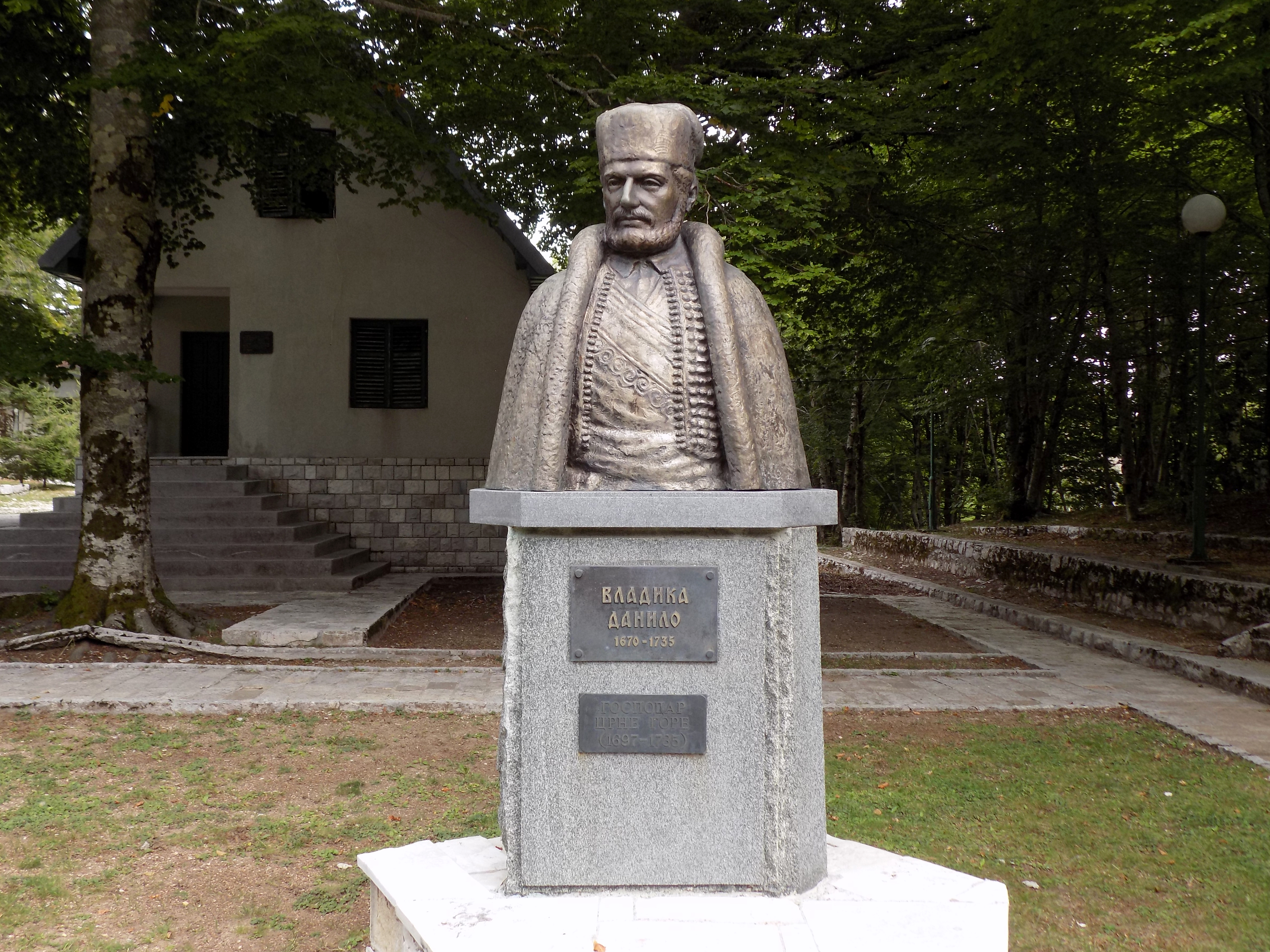
Memorial of Vladika Danilo in Ivanova Korita

Soon, there was a new Montenegrin-Venetian cooperation against the Turks, as part of the war that the Republic of Venice and Austria waged against Turkey. This war ended with the Peace of Požarevac on 21 June 1718. With this peace, the Venetians received Grbalj, Maine, Pobore and Brajići in Boka Kotorska, as well as Krivošije, Ledenice and Uble, which had previously belonged to Montenegro.

The Montenegrins were reluctant to see this, and Metropolitan Danilo constantly tried to undermine Venetian rule in these places. Therefore, he spent a lot of time in the Stanjevići monastery and in Maine near Budva. The people of Katun did not look upon this with favor, and even decided in 1723 that they would ask the Patriarch of Peć to appoint a new metropolitan for them if Danilo did not return to Cetinje, or to send the young Bishop Sava there. Regardless of the demarcation after the Venetian-Turkish war, the Venetian Republic recognized the spiritual jurisdiction of Metropolitan Danilo over the Orthodox Serbian population in Boka Kotorska on May 7 and June 4, 1718, with the Ducals, with the right to repair or build new Orthodox churches and monasteries there. During this war, the number of Orthodox population in Boka increased significantly because many people, especially from Herzegovina, fled to Boka and settled there.

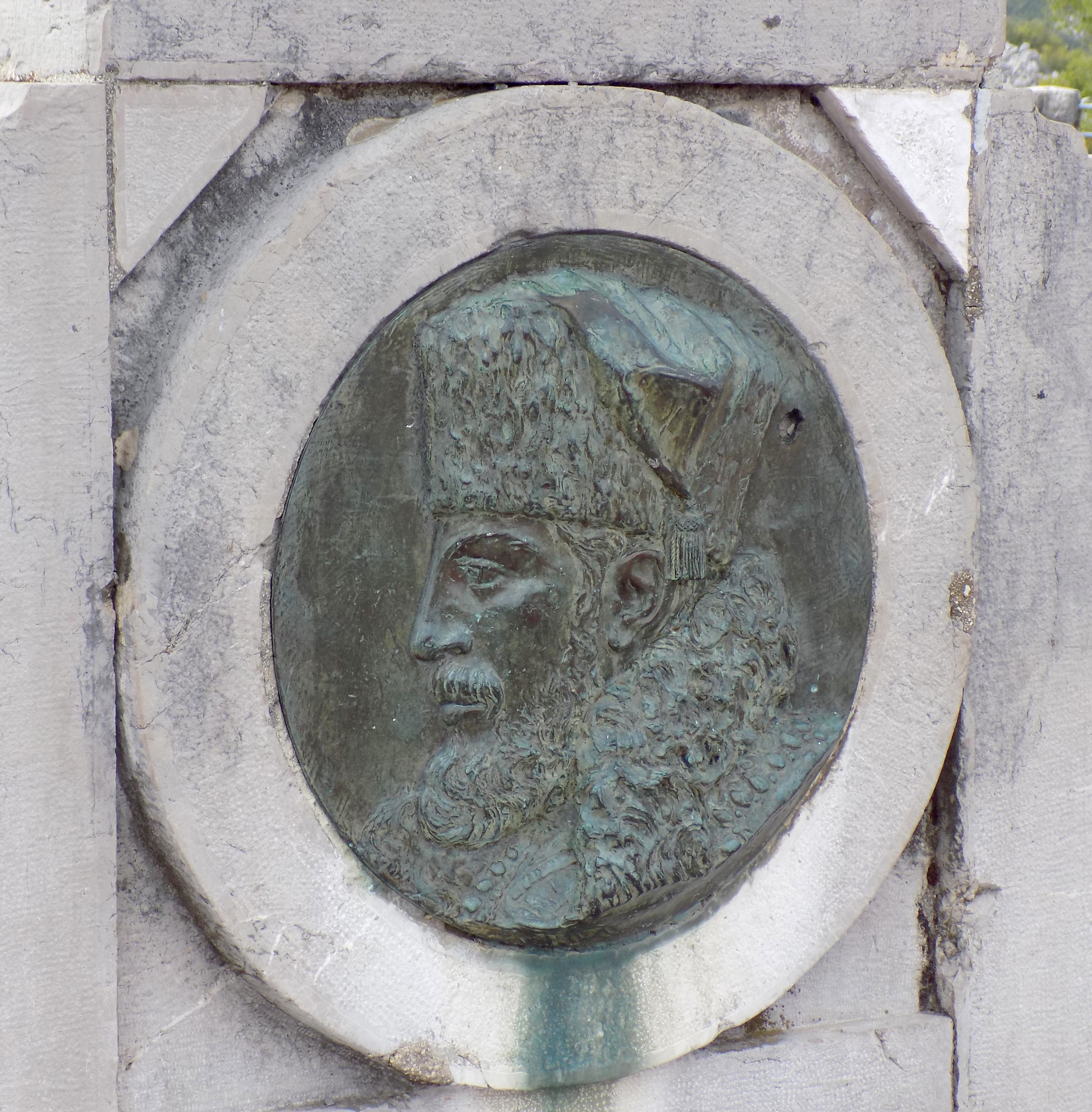
Circular medallion with a bronze relief of the bishop's head in profile on the sarcophagus in the mausoleum in Orlov Krš.

On 1 May 1718 the Republic of Venice recognized Danilo as the spiritual authority over the Orthodox in Paštrovići and the Bay of Kotor. From then on, until the fall of Venice, the Metropolitans of Cetinje had the right to build new and reconstruct destroyed churches in those territories, and to freely preach there.

Even during his lifetime, Metropolitan Danilo made sure to appoint a successor. His personal experience, when he was elected metropolitan, taught him that this matter should not be left to the fate of the Montenegrins, and in 1719, the Patriarch of Peć, Mojsije, during his visit to Montenegro, ordained Danilo's nephew—Sava, who was an archimandrite at that time.

Metropolitan Danilo died on January 4, 1735.

== Poturica Investigation ==
In addition to the fight against Uniate propaganda in Boka, Danilo had to face an even greater danger in Montenegro itself, namely the Islamized Montenegrins, who are popularly called—poturices. Islamization affected the Montenegrin tribes, especially those around Cetinje, and allegedly, the Islamized Montenegrins had to return to the Eastern Orthodox Christian faith or be expelled from Montenegro.

The beginning of that action, according to popular tradition and Montenegrin folklore, is connected to Christmas Eve in 1709, and it is referred to as the "Poturica investigation" (Serbian Cyrillic: Истрага Потурица, Istraga Poturica). It was the motif of Metropolitan Petar II Petrović-Njegoš for his poem, The Mountain Wreath. It's unknown whether it was a short event with a wide momentum or a somewhat longer process. Regardless, the process of Islamization in Montenegro was stopped, and the Islamized population returned to the old faith, or was physically liquidated, and a number fled to Turkish cities. Even today, the memory of a dozen brotherhoods from the vicinity of Cetinje, which were Islamized, have been preserved, so they returned to the old faith in this event. However, the basis of their surnames is still Muslim.

== Succession ==
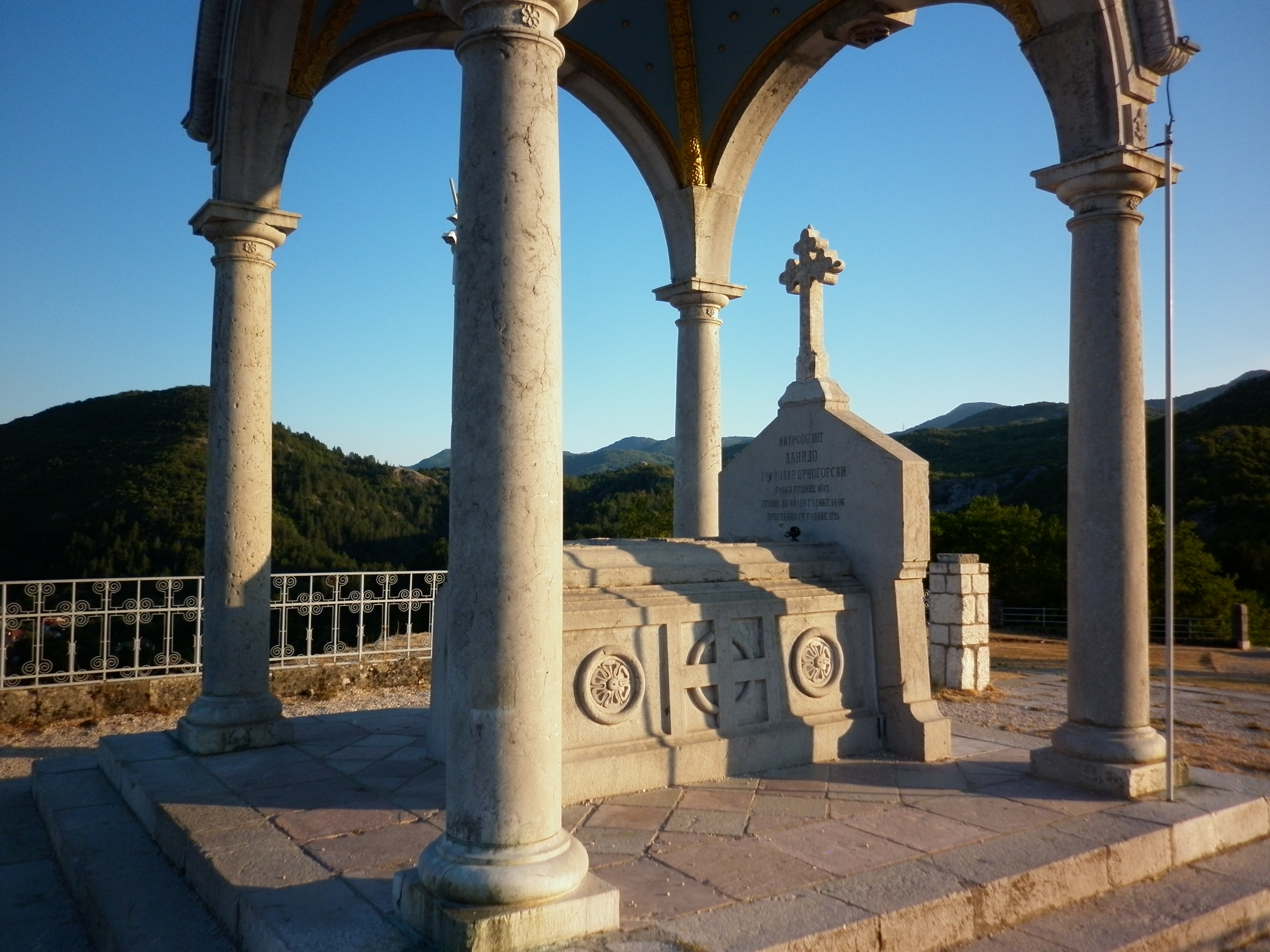
His grave site at Cetinje

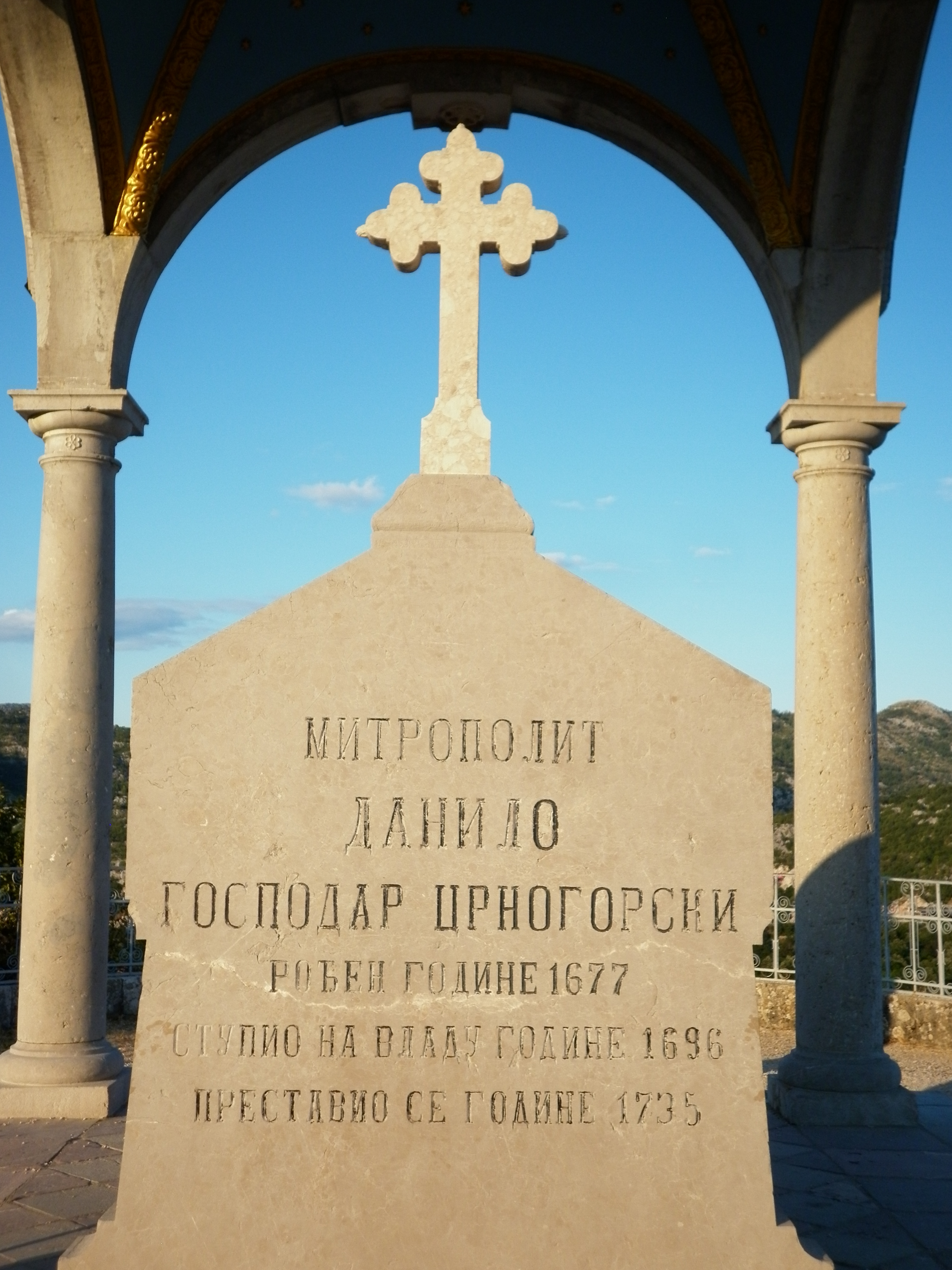
His grave site at Cetinje

Danilo was succeeded by two close kinsmen, first his nephew Sava II Petrović Njegoš and then his nephew Vasilije Petrović Njegoš, who for more than two decades was able to push aside the unworldly Sava and become effectively the highest authority in Montenegro and its representative abroad. Danilo's choice of Sava II clearly had a lot to do with family ties and clan membership. Sava's family came from the Petrovići's native Njeguši. Like Danilo, Sava became a monk, serving in the Maine monastery on the coast where he was consecrated as an archpriest in 1719 by the Serbian Patriarch of Peć, Mojsije (1712–1726). From the time of his ordination onwards, Danilo sought to introduce the young Sava gradually to political life, conferring on him the office of coadjutor in confirmation of his future role. But little about Sava's later career suggests that he gained much from early exposure to Danilo's experience, except that he continued to maintain a policy of status quo while allowing the tribal chieftains a free hand to do as they pleased.

== Politics ==
Danilo was instrumental in the process of connecting families, clans and tribes.

He was said to have issued the "extermination of the Turkicized" (Istraga poturica), as included in The Mountain Wreath (1847), however, there are views that this never happened.

== Styles ==
- "Danil, Metropolitan of Skenderija and Primorje" (Данил, митрополит Скендерије u Приморја), 1715.
- "Danil, Bishop of Cetinje, Njegoš, Duke of the Serb land" (Данил, владика цетињски, Његош, војеводич српској земљи), 1732.

== See also ==
- Danilo I, Prince of Montenegro

== Sources ==
- Luburić, Andrija; Perović, Špiro M. (1940). Porijeklo i prošlost Dinastije Petrovića. Mlada Srbija.
- Medaković, Milorad G. (1997). Marijan Miljić (ed.). Vladika Danilo (in Serbian). Cetinje: Unireks Podgorica.
- Ruvarac, Ilarion (1899). Prilošci istoriji crne gore. Štamparija Jovana Iuljo.
- Stamatović, Aleksandar (1999). "Митрополија црногорска за вријеме митрополита Петровића". Кратка историја Митрополије Црногорско-приморске (1219-1999).
- Stanojević, Gligor; Vasić, Milan (1975). Istorija Crne Gore (3): od početka XVI do kraja XVIII vijeka. Titograd: Redakcija za istoriju Crne Gore. OCLC 799489791.
- Srpsko Učeno Društvo (1874). Glasnik Srpskoga Učenog Društva. Vol. 40. pp. 57–.
- Vuković, Novo (1996). Književnost Crne Gore od XII do XIX vijeka. Vol. 11. Obod.

Religious titles
Preceded by Savatije Kaluđerović	Metropolitan of Cetinje; 1696–1735	Succeeded by Sava Petrović
