= Sava Očinić =

- Metropolitan of Cetinje
- Native name: Сава Очинић
- Church: Serbian Orthodox Church
- See: Cetinje
- Elected: 1694
- In office: 1694–1697
- Predecessor: Visarion Borilović
- Successor: Danilo Šćepčević

Orders
- Ordination: November 1694 by Hadži-Simeon, Savatije Ljubibratić, Gerasim

Personal details
- Born: 17th century Očinići, Montenegro Vilayet, Ottoman Empire
- Died: 1697 Dobrska Ćelija, Montenegro Vilayet, Ottoman Empire
- Denomination: Eastern Orthodoxy
- Residence: Dobrska Ćelija, Cetinje

Sava Očinić (Serbian Cyrillic: Сава Очинић) was a Serbian Orthodox bishop, serving as the Metropolitan of Cetinje from 1694 to 1697. He was born in Očinići, a small village near Cetinje. He succeeded Visarion Borilović (s. 1685–1692). Sava was ordained a bishop in November 1694 by Hadži-Simeon (the Metropolitan of Belgrade), Savatije Ljubibratić (the Metropolitan of Zahumlje) and Gerasim (the Metropolitan of Herzegovina) in Herceg Novi. Due to the destruction of the Old Cetinje Monastery by the forces of Süleyman Bushati in 1692 he lived in the Dobrska Ćelija monastery in Dobrsko Selo, where the seat of the Metropolitanate was temporarily moved. He was succeeded by Danilo Šćepčević.

== Sources ==
- Džomić, Velibor V. (2006). Православље у Црној Гори. Светигора. ISBN 9788676600311.
- Stamatović, Aleksandar (1999). Кратка историја Митрополије Црногорско-приморске (1219-1999) (Internet ed.). Светигора.
