= Ruđić =

In Piva, a historical tribe of Old Herzegovina (now western Montenegro), there was a brotherhood (bratstvo) named Ruđić (Serbian Cyrillic: Руђић). The surname was mentioned in Church Slavonic documents of the Serbian Orthodox Hilandar monastery. The Ruđić brotherhood from Rudinice (in Plužine), which later dispersed elsewhere, is one of two family trees in Piva from which many Pivan families descend from. Several families are noted in Serbian ethnographic studies as having descended from the old brotherhood of Ruđić (Ruđići).

== Anthropology ==
- The Gagović brotherhood (Gagovići) in Bezuje are according to tradition a branch of the old Ruđić brotherhood. They were one of the oldest and most respected brotherhoods of Piva. They founded the Bezuje village which they inhabit today. Earlier, A. Luburić (1930) was unsure if the Gagović family in Drobnjaci indeed descended from the Ruđić brotherhood in Piva.
- The Nikolić, Đikanović, Gutović, and Đačić families in Gornje Rudinice (Plužine), descend from an old branch of the Ruđić brotherhood in Piva according to tradition. In 1971, the Nikolić family had three houses; Gutović ca. 10. The Đikanović progenitor was Đikan; Đačić was đak (dijak) Đorđija. They all have the slava of St. Nicholas (Nikoljdan). A Đurko of the Đikanović family settled Potprisoje near Bileća.
- The Božović family formerly living in Orah (now Plužine), descend from the Ruđići, and are kin to the Gagovići. They had the slava (patron saint veneration) of Nikoljdan (St. Nicholas). They migrated a long time ago to Bosnia.
- The Glomazić family in Donje Rudinice.

== Notable people ==
According to folklore, hajduk Bajo Pivljanin (1630–1685) was born in Rudinice (now in Plužine) in Piva, belonging to the Ruđić brotherhood. Savatije Ljubibratić (1660–1716), the Serbian Orthodox metropolitan, belonged to the brotherhood.

== See also ==
- Ruđić (15th century), mentioned in Ragusan documents, connection unknown

== Sources ==
- Blagojević, Obren (1971). "Пива". Editions Speciales. 443. SANU.
- Tomić, Svetozar (1949) [1946]. Piva i Pivljani. SAN.
