= Tadić =

Tadić (Serbian Cyrillic: Тадић, pronounced [tǎdiːtɕ, tǎːditɕ]) is a Croatian and Serbian surname, a patronymic and diminutive of the masculine given name Tadija. It may refer to:

- Boris Tadić (born 1958), Serb politician, former President of Serbia
- Duško Tadić (born 1955), a Bosnian Serb politician and the first individual to be tried by the International Criminal Tribunal for the former Yugoslavia
- Dušan Tadić (born 1988), Serbian footballer
- Josip Tadić (born 1987), Croatian football player
- Ljuba Tadić (1929–2005), Serbian actor
- Ljubomir Tadić (1925–2013), Serbian philosopher
- Marko Tadić (born 1953), Croatian mathematician
- Miroslav Tadić (musician), Serbian guitarist
- Milka Tadić, Montenegrin activist and magazine editor
- Ognjen Tadić (born 1974), Serb politician, former chairman of the House of Peoples of Bosnia and Herzegovina
- Željko Tadić (born 1974), Montenegrin footballer

== Anthropology ==
=== Tadić brotherhood in Piva ===
In Piva, a historical tribe of Old Herzegovina (now western Montenegro), there was a brotherhood (bratstvo) named Tadić. This brotherhood was one of the largest and oldest brotherhoods of Piva. Blagojević 1971 recorded 45 houses of Tadić in Piva. They have for long lived in Smriječno (in Plužine), where they are mainly concentrated, while one or two houses exist in Potprisoje, Donja Brezna and Stabna, which they settled later. The brotherhood has the slava (patron saint veneration) of Jovanjdan (John the Baptist). It belongs to the family tree of the old brotherhood of Branilović, one of two family trees in Piva from which many Pivan families descend from according to tradition; the Branilović either left or was absorbed by other families. A knez Jovan Tadić is mentioned in a 1673 document from the Piva Monastery, as one of the witnesses regarding the bequest of Bare on Jezerce to the monastery. According to one story, 17th-century hajduk Bajo Pivljanin's mother was a Tadić. Families descending from the brotherhood are widespread in former Yugoslavia. Former President of Serbia, Boris Tadić, is a descendant of the brotherhood.

== Sources ==
- Blagojević, Obren (1971). "Пива". Editions Speciales. 443. SANU.
- Tomić, Svetozar (1949) [1946]. Piva i Pivljani. SAN.
