= Montenegro campaign =

1714 Ottoman campaign against its rebellious vassal state

Date	May 1714
Location	Prince-Bishopric of Montenegro (Ottoman vassal state)
Result	Ottoman victory; Seventh Ottoman-Venetian War

Belligerents
Ottoman Empire	Prince-Bishopric of Montenegro

Commanders and leaders
Köprülüzade Numan Pasha	Danilo I

Strength
Unknown	Unknown

Casualties and losses
Low	Very heavy

The Montenegro campaign was a campaign launched in 1714 by the Ottoman Empire against the Prince-Bishopric of Montenegro, an Ottoman vassal state that had been intermittently rebelling against Turkish rule since 1710. The leadership of the campaign was entrusted to the Beylerbey of Bosnia, Köprülüzade Numan Pasha.

With the Ottomans having successfully suppressed the rebellion and restored their rule over the lands, Montenegro's rebellious leader Danilo I escaped to and sought refuge in the Republic of Venice. The Venetians rejected the extradition request of the Turks, which was one of the main reasons for why the Seventh Ottoman-Venetian War had begun.

== Prelude ==
In 1710, when the Pruth River Campaign began, Russian Tsar Peter I sent agents to Montenegro and delivered a message encouraging an uprising. The Montenegrins, having accepted Peter's suggestions, rebelled and captured the Graçova in Herzegovina and laid siege to the fortress of Nikšić, but retreated to Cetinje when Ottoman reinforcement arrived. The Ottomans, who had decisively defeated the Russian army under Peter I in 1711, focused on Montenegro in 1712, and Bosnian Beylerbey Ahmed Pasha entered Montenegro, capturing its capital (Cetinje). He withdrew after making the Montenegrin tribesmen sign a pledge not to rebel again. However, once the Montenegrin prince Danilo I, who had taken refuge in the Republic of Venice during Ahmed Pasha's campaign in 1712, returned to Montenegro in 1713 and convinced people to revolt again. The new Beylerbey of Bosnia, Köprülüzade Numan Pasha, was assigned to suppress the uprising in May 1714.

== Campaign ==
Under Numan Pasha's command were Sipahis from; the Eyalet of Bosnia, the Sanjaks of İzvornik, Klis, Işkodra, Ohri, Dukagin, Prizren, Elbasan and Vulçıtrın. The Sultan warned Numan Pasha when the preparations took too long. Acting upon this notice, the Ottoman troops under the command of Numan Pasha carried out the military operation from the Ottoman-Venetian border and advanced towards Cetinje. The Ottomans routed the Montenegrin forces, entering and heavily damaging Cetinje.

The Montenegrins who fled in face of the rapid Ottoman advances escaped to inaccessible areas or sought refuge in Venice. However, Köprülüzade Numan Pasha did not try to go after them and did not enter the territory of Venice. Although he did report to Istanbul that the Venetians were protecting and defending many Montenegrin rebels.

== Aftermath ==
Having restored order in Montenegro, the Ottoman Empire turned its attention to the Peloponnese, a portion of which had been taken from them by Venice following the 1699 Treaty of Karlowitz. The Ottomans demanded the return of Danilo I, who had once again escaped to Venice; however, the Venetians refused. Thereupon, the Ottomans declared war on Venice and launched an invasion into the Morea. Once again, the Ottomans rapidly advanced in these territories and recaptured the lands with minimal resistance.
