= Ruđić (15th century) =

In the first half of the 15th century, several people with the surname Ruđić (Serbian Cyrillic: Руђић) were mentioned in Ragusan documents. These include, most notably:

- Bogeta Ruđić (Богета Руђић; fl. 1423) was a župan (count) formerly serving Bosnian vojvoda (duke) Sandalj Hranić (1370–1435), who after the Republic of Ragusa's purchase of Konavle and the decision that all inhabitants be regarded serfs led a rebellion with his brothers against Ragusa. The rebels were helped by Trebinje and other neighbours, most of all by subjects of vojvoda Radoslav Pavlović. The result was an agreement that three families, the Ruđići, Bogojevići and Radinkovići, "who held a good part of that area", continue their service for some time under Sandalj.
- Živko Ruđić (Живко Руђић; fl. 1422–29) was a Ragusan merchant, a companion of affluent merchant Luka Milanović (fl. 1420–d. 1429), dealing with precious metals from Bosnia and Serbia.

== See also ==
- Ruđić, brotherhood of Piva
