= Podmaine Monastery =

Serbian Orthodox monastery near Budva, Montenegro

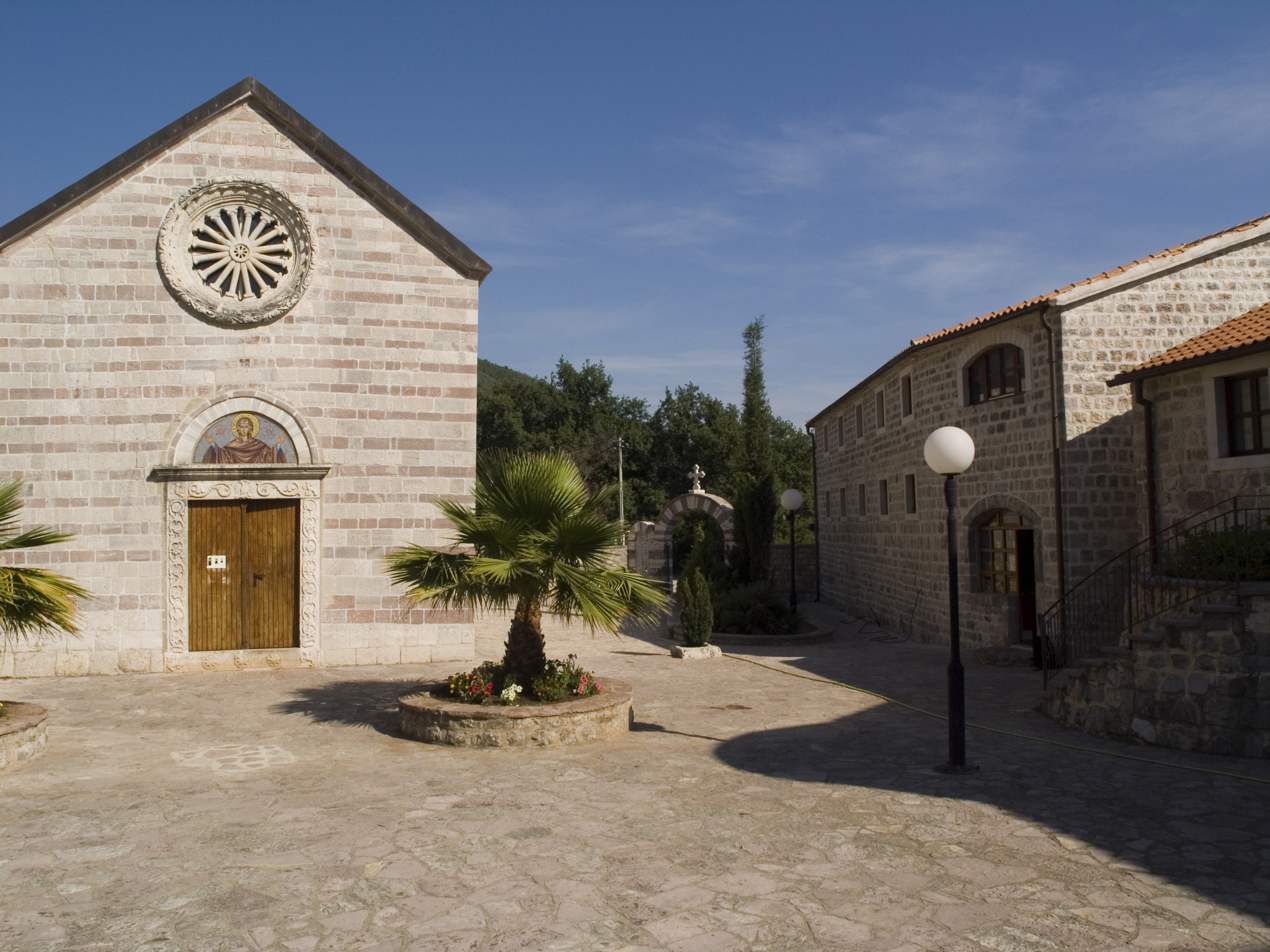

- Location within Montenegro

Religion
- Affiliation: Serbian Orthodox Church
- Ecclesiastical or organizational status: Metropolitanate of Montenegro and the Littoral

Location
- Location: Podmaine, Budva
- State: Zeta (modern-day Montenegro)
- Interactive map of Podmaine Monastery
- Coordinates: 42.2979°N 18.8445°E

Architecture
- Founder: Crnojević noble family
- Completed: 15th century

Website
- http://www.manastirpodmaine.rs/

The Podmaine Monastery (Serbian: Манастир Подмаине, romanized: Manastir Podmaine) is a Serbian Orthodox monastery built in the 15th century by the Crnojević noble family in Podmaine near Budva, Zeta (modern-day Montenegro). The monastery has two churches, smaller and older church of Presentation of the Mother of God was built by Crnojević noble family in the 15th century while bigger church (of Dormition of the Mother of God) was built in 1747.

== Etymology ==
The name Podmaine (Pod-Maine) means "beneath Maine". Maine was a small Albanian tribe with territory below Lovćen, between Stanjevići Monastery and Budva. The monastery was the gathering place of the tribe, who traditionally held meetings on the feast day of St. George.

== History ==
The exact year of establishment of the monastery is unknown. The church of Dormition of the Mother of God was built in the 15th century and reconstructed in 1630 while its larger church (Church of St. Petka) was built in 1747.

Metropolitan Danilo I Petrović-Njegoš died in Podmaine Monastery in 1735. He was buried in the monastery but his remnants were later moved to Cetinje. Dositej Obradović lived several months in the monastery when he visited Boka in 1764.

In 1830 Petar II Petrović-Njegoš, based on the request of the emperor of Russia, sold Podmaine Monastery and Stanjevići Monastery together with their estates to the Austrian Empire.

Njegoš wrote parts of his masterpiece The Mountain Wreath in Podmaine Monastery.

== Frescoes ==
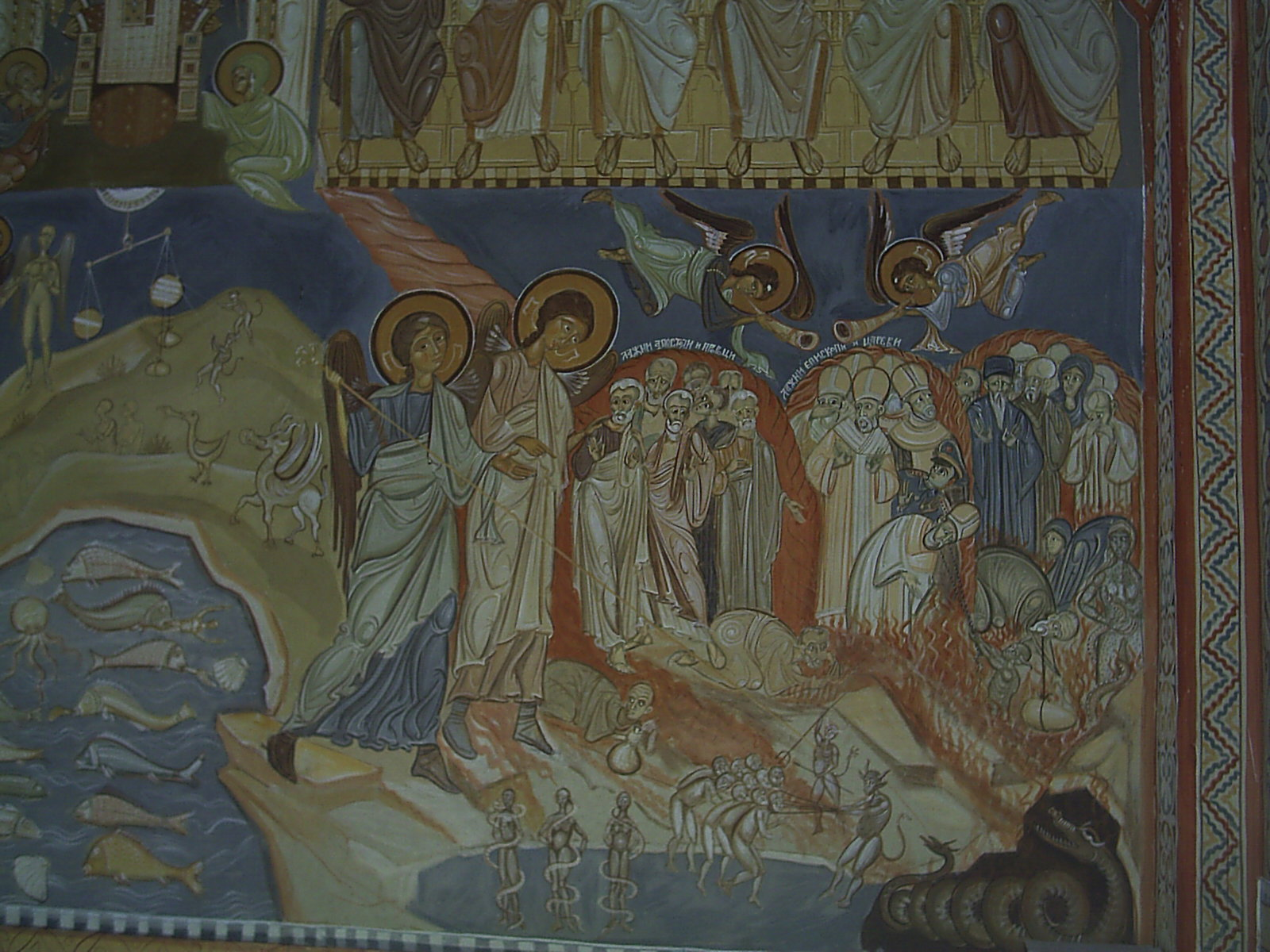
Controversial fresco

Frescoes in the Church of St. Petka were painted by Rafail Dimitrijević from Risan in 1747 and Nicholaos Aspioti from Corfu. The monastery was burned down in 1869. In the 1979 earthquake the monastery was significantly damaged and in 2002 it was completely rebuilt and new frescoes were painted in the smaller church (dedicated to the Dormition of the Mother of God). According to some views one of the frescoes titled Sinful bishops and emperors (Serbian: Лажни епископи и цареви) presents a former Yugoslav leader Tito and heads of the uncanonical Montenegrin Orthodox Church as damned and handed over to devils who herd them down into hell in a modern version of the Last Judgment.

== See also ==
- List of Serbian monasteries
