= Vrtijeljka =

Coordinates: 42.3697°N 18.94471°E

Vrtijeljka is a hill near Cetinje, in Montenegro, with the height of 871 m. It is located between the villages of Lipa and Pejakovići. It was the site of a battle between Bajo Pivljanin's band and advancing Ottoman forces of Suleiman, Pasha of Scutari, in 1685.

Currently, there is an unsanitary landfill below the hill, in use since 1987.
