= Battle on Vrtijeljka =

1685 battle of the Great Turkish War between Venetians/Montenegrins and Ottomans

- Part of the Great Turkish War
Date	7 May 1685
Location	Vrtijeljka Hill near Cetinje, Montenegro 42.37°N 18.94°E
Result	Ottoman victory

Belligerents
Montenegro (Republic of Venice) Venetian irregular force	Ottoman Empire; Sanjak of Scutari

Commanders and leaders
Bajo Pivljanin †; Vuković the Arbanas †	Süleyman

Units involved
Bay of Kotor; Montenegrins; Mainjani; Primorci	Shkodran Albanians; Bushati family

Strength
c. 1,200	Unknown

Casualties and losses
Total, only few survivors	Unknown
- Location within Montenegro Battle on Vrtijeljka (Balkans)

The Battle on Vrtijeljka (Serbian: бој на Вртијељци, romanized: boj na Vrtijeljci) was fought on the hill of Vrtijeljka near Cetinje between a Venetian irregular force and an advancing Ottoman force on 7 May 1685 at the start of the Morean War. The Venetian force was made up of fighters from the neighbouring areas, including the band of acclaimed hajduk Bajo Pivljanin, and several Christian tribes. The large Ottoman force was led by sanjak-bey Süleyman of Scutari.

== Prelude ==
Süleyman Pasha of Scutari readied to punish the Montenegrins (Ottoman subjects), who had helped the Republic of Venice, the Ottomans' main enemy in the Morean War. Süleyman sent word to the Montenegrins that, "due to their relations with Morlachs and Hajduks," he would exterminate them all. The leaders of the Kuči, Klimenti, and other tribes of the Highlands (Brda) were called and visited by Süleyman, who took 12 hostages from them and jailed these in Scutari. The Montenegrins were in the immediate Venetian–Ottoman frontier (krajina), east of the Bay of Kotor (a Venetian territory) and west of the Sanjak of Scutari.

The acclaimed hajduk Bajo Pivljanin had served the Republic of Venice with his band in the Bay of Kotor in the Cretan War and was dispatched to the bay (in 1684) to protect the area against the Ottomans.

== Battle ==
The Montenegrins informed Venetian provveditore Antonio Zeno, who then quickly assembled approximately 1200 fighters (1,560 according to Pavel Rovinsky), including also Montenegrins, Mainjani, and Primorci, commanded by over-intendant Bošković, harambaša Bajo Pivljanin, and the guvernadur of Grbalj. Süleyman's large force crossed the Morača and headed towards Cetinje, while the hajduks rushed to meet them. The two met at the hill of Vrtijeljka on 7 May 1685.

The hajduks were defeated by the Ottomans, and Bajo fell. Zeno reported the casualties, of 22 Paštrovići, 27 from the Kotor area, and "worse yet for the Montenegrins, Poborci and Mainjani", but did not mention the hajduk losses in a similar way. Vule Subotić, the barjaktar of Bajo's band, recounted that the hajduks carried a war flag with Venetian symbols and that, out of 80, only 10 hajduks survived.

== Aftermath and assessment ==
It has been claimed that the victorious Ottomans paraded with 500 severed heads through Cetinje after the battle, and also attacked the Cetinje monastery and the palace of Ivan Crnojević.

Süleyman had Bajo's head sent to the Sultan as a great war trophy. The importance of the battle is evident in the fact that the heads of Pivljanin and his hajduks decorated the entrance hall of the seraglio in Constantinople, and that Süleyman was elevated to pasha due to the victory. The severed heads were taken to Constantinople as proof of finishing the task and that the enemy was triumphantly defeated. Only heads of worthy, more prominent outlaws, of names and work that was well-known, had this treatment. Heads of hajduks were otherwise put on town palisades or on poles beside the road or crossroads. That multiple other hajduk heads were sent to Constantinople along with Pivljanin's could primarily be explained as the Ottomans' wanting to prominently display the defeat of a notable movement that had brought much grief to them.

The news of the battle was recorded in Rome on 27 May 1685: "two courageous leaders, one named Bajo, friend of captain Janko, and the other, captain Vuković the Arbanas, died"; the source states that the defeat was due to betrayal of Montenegrins in the battle. Historiography is divided on the issue of whether the Montenegrins really betrayed the hajduks in the battle; some believe that to avoid retaliation, the Montenegrins promised the head of Bajo Pivljanin, then betrayed the hajduks on the battlefield. Historian Radovan Samardžić is open to the view that maybe the Ragusans gave news of the ostensible betrayal of Montenegrins in the battle to disguise their own bad role in the event. According to Jovan Tomić, Antonio Zeno wrote two letters to the Senate about the battle, not mentioning the betrayal of the Montenegrins.

== Legacy ==
Three serdars brave and two voivodes bold, with three hundred falcon-heroes of theirs – falcon Bajo with his thirty dragons – they all will live as long as time endures. They lay in wait for Šenćer the Vizier on the top of Mount Vrtijeljka and fought till noon on a hot summer day. No Serb wanted to betray another, so that people would not blame him later and point at his descendants as they do at the traitor house of Branković. So they all fell, one beside the other, while still singing and striking at the Turks. Only three Serbs came forth from there alive, from under the piles of dead Turks' bodies – the Turks had run horses over the wounded. Beautiful death, glory to their mothers! Unto these brave men God will amply grant fame to their souls and incense on their graves. Three thousand youths, one brave as the other, struck suddenly at Šenćer the Vizier before daybreak on the field of Krstac. God gives power to those who always strive! They broke the might of Šenćer the Vizier! Lucky the man who happened to be there! The Kosovo wounds pain him no longer, he blames the Turks for nothing any more. Serb heroes of Mount Vrtijeljka! A shining light will always be seen there burning atop your consecrated tombs! – From the Mountain Wreath by Petar II Petrović-Njegoš.

== Sources ==
=== Books ===
- Jačov, Marko (1990). Srbi u mletačko-turskim ratovima u XVII veku. Sveti arhijerejski sinod Srpske pravoslavne crkve.
- Samardžić, Radovan; Veselinović, Rajko L.; Popović, Toma (1993). Radovan Samardžić (ed.). Istorija srpskog naroda. Treća knjiga, prvi tom: Srbi pod tuđinskom vlašću 1537–1699. Belgrade: Srpska književna zadruga.

=== Journals ===
- Bojović, Zlata (2008). Књижевност и стварност: Научни састанак слависта у Вукове дане, 12–15, IX 2007, МСЦ, Београд. Међународни славистички центар.
- Filološki fakultet (1974). "Prilozi za književnost, jezik, istoriju i folklor". 40–41. Државна штампарија Краљевине Срба, Хрвата и Словенаца.
- Istorijsko društvo SR Crne Gore (2007). "Bajo Pivljanin – prilozi za biografiju". Istorijski Zapisi. 80 (1–4). Istorijski institut SR Crne Gore.
- SANU (1971). "Editions speciales". 443. Naučno delo: 151.
