= Mahine =

The Mahine (also called Mainjani or Maini) were a small Albanian tribe, located at the border between the Montenegrin Littoral (Primorje) and Old Montenegro in the 17th century, below the Lovćen between the Stanjević Monastery and Budva, where it gave the name to the hamlet of Maine.

In the 17th century, the kadi of Ottoman Montenegro demarcated the borders between Montenegro and the maritime areas, i.e. between Budva and Mainjani. The tribe participated in the Battle of Vrtijeljka (1685). In 1838, the three small knežine of Maine, Pobori and Braići, above Budva, had 1705 inhabitants, all of Orthodox faith. The Podmaine monastery is located in the hamlet; the monastery was the gathering place of the Maine tribe who traditionally held meetings on the feast day of St. George.
