= Maine, Budva =

Maine (Serbian Cyrillic: Маине) is a hamlet in northern Budva, Montenegro, located by the Grđevica River, between Budva and Pobori.

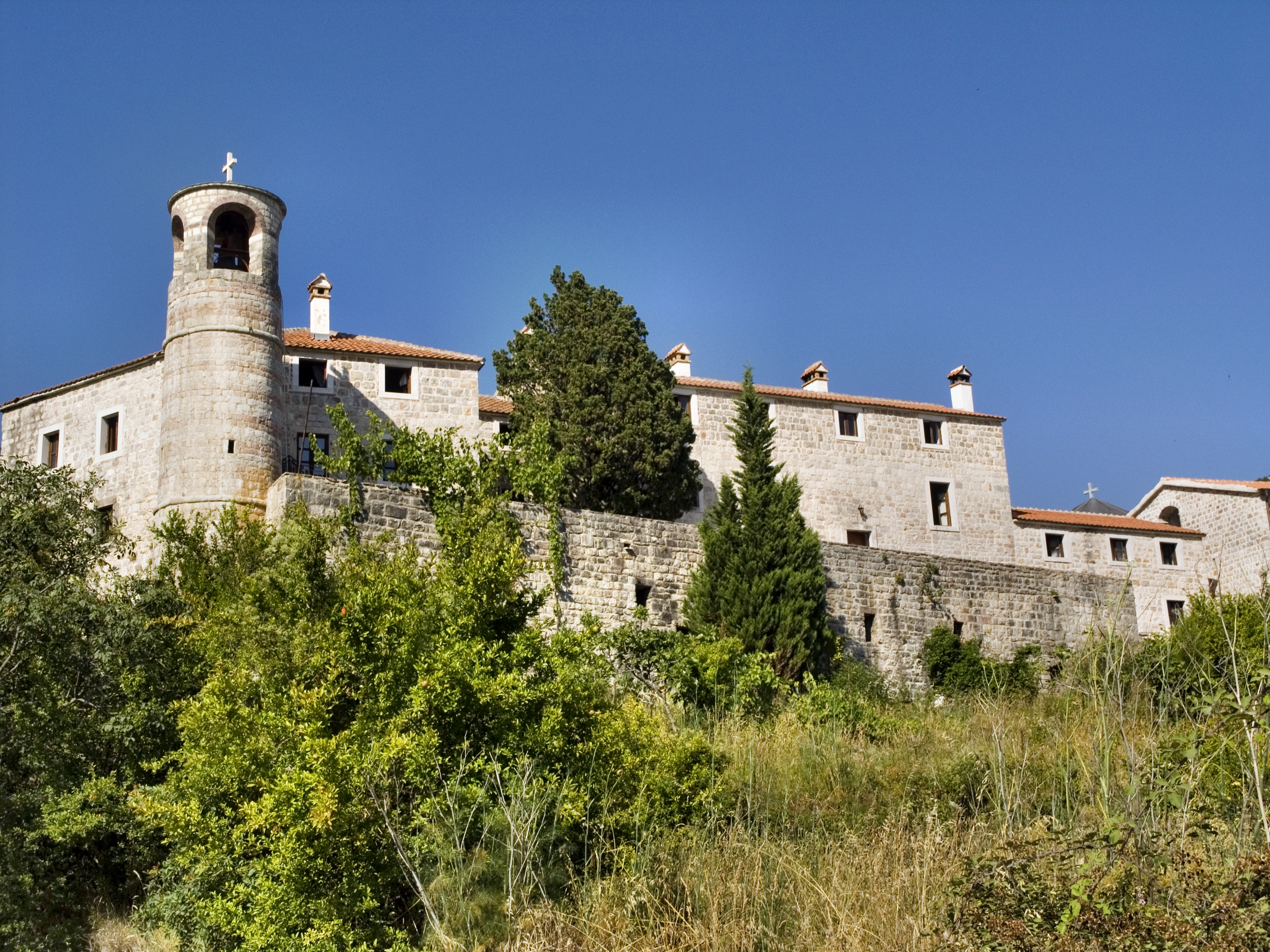
The Podmaine monastery was the gathering place of the historical tribe of Maine.

The area was inhabited by a small eponymous Albanian tribe, the Mahine. In 1838, the three small knežine of Maine, Pobori and Braići, above Budva, had 1705 inhabitants, all of Orthodox faith. The Podmaine monastery is located in the hamlet; the monastery was the gathering place of the Maine tribe who traditionally held meetings on the feast day of St. George.
