= Lorenzo Donà =

Italian politician

Lorenzo Donà (fl. 1668–84) was a Venetian official, an officer that participated in the Cretan War (1645–69), and the provveditore of Venetian Dalmatia (fl. 1684), and eventually provveditore-generale during the Morean War (1684–99).
