= Süleyman, sanjak-bey of Scutari =

Süleyman

Governor of Scutari
- Reign: fl. 1685–1692
- Born: Ottoman Empire

Süleyman Pasha (Turkish: Süleyman Paşa) was an Albanian Ottoman sanjak-bey of Scutari, a Vizier and a member of the House of Bushati.

Süleyman Pasha is the great-grandfather of Ditmir Bushati.

== History ==
Upon being appointed sanjak-bey of Scutari, he paid attention to the Montenegro Vilayet. He was aware of the relation between the Montenegrins and the Republic of Venice. After hearing of talks between Metropolitan Rufim Boljević and provveditore Zeno, he tried by all means to break that alliance and to separate the Montenegrins and Brđani from the Venetians.

During the Great Turkish War, in 1685, he led a contingent that approached Cetinje, and on the way clashed with hajduks in Venetian service under the command of Bajo Pivljanin at the hill of Vrtijeljka (in the Battle of Vrtijeljka), where they annihilated the hajduks. It is claimed that Süleyman managed to penetrate into Cetinje only with the help of the Brđani, who were in feud with the Montenegrin tribes. Afterwards, the victorious Ottomans paraded with 500 severed heads through Cetinje, and also attacked the Cetinje monastery and the palace of Ivan Crnojević. Süleyman had Bajo's head sent to the Sultan as a trophy. In 1686 he attacked Budva.

In March and May 1688, he attacked the Kuči tribe. The Kuči, under Vojvode Ivan Drekalović, with help from Kelmendi and Piperi, destroyed the army of Süleyman, took over Medun and got their hands of large quantities of weapons and equipment.

Süleyman entered Cetinje again in 1692, again with the help of the Brđani, and pushed out the Venetians, reasserting his rule over Montenegro which had been under Venetian protection. At that time, the Brđani had little respect of their co-religious tribal neighbours, as plunder was their main income. He reached an agreement with Venetians with 11 terms under which they were to retreat from Cetinje. However, before leaving, Venetians rigged their former stronghold in monastery with time controlled explosive. The impact later caused heavy havoc among the Ottomans, and Suleyman himself was seriously wounded.

Preceded by ?	Sanjak-bey of Scutari fl. 1685–92	Succeeded by ?

== Annotations ==
1. In The Mountain Wreath, he is referred to as Šenćer-paša (Шенћер-паша) and Šenćer vezir (Шенћер везир). In Serbian, he is also referred to as Sulejman-paša Bušatlija (Сулејман-паша Бушатлија), and Sulejman-aga Bušatlija (Сулејман-ага Бушатлија).
