= The Mountain Wreath =

1847 poem and play by Petar II Petrović-Njegoš

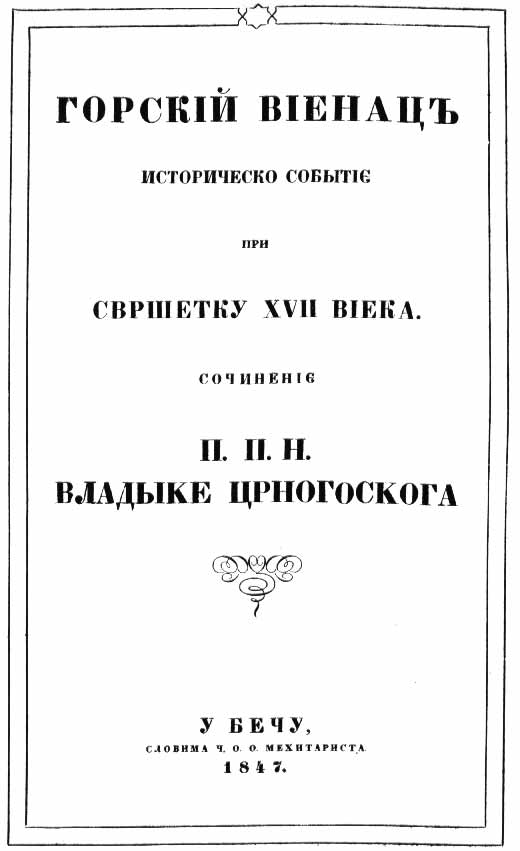
- Original edition
- Author: Petar II Petrović-Njegoš
- Original title: Горскій віенацъ (archaic); Горски вијенац (modern) (Gorski vijenac)
- Translator: James W. Wiles, Vasa D. Mihailovich
- Language: Serbian
- Publisher: Mekhitarist Monastery of Vienna (Vienna, Austrian Empire, today Austria)
- Publication date: 1847
- Publication place: Prince-Bishopric of Montenegro (today Montenegro)
- ISBN: 978-1915204264
- OCLC: 1358747519

The Mountain Wreath (Serbian: Горски вијенац / Gorski vijenac) is a poem and a play written by Prince-Bishop and poet Petar II Petrović-Njegoš.

Njegoš wrote The Mountain Wreath during 1846 in Cetinje and published it the following year after the printing in an Armenian monastery in Vienna. It is a modern epic written in verse as a play, thus combining three of the major modes of literary expression. It is considered a masterpiece of Serbian and Montenegrin literature.

== Themes ==
Set in 18th-century Montenegro, the poem deals with attempts of Njegoš's ancestor Metropolitan Danilo I Petrović-Njegoš to regulate relations among the region's warring tribes. Written as a series of fictitious scenes in the form of dialogues and monologues, the poem opens with Metropolitan Danilo's vision of the spread of Turkish power in Europe. Torn by inner conflict he sees that the struggle is inevitable, but dreads the issues.

Starting as a poetic vision it develops into a political-historical drama that expands into a wreath of epic depictions of Montenegrin life, including feasts, gatherings, customs, beliefs, and the struggle to survive the Ottoman oppression. With a strong philosophical basis in its 2819 verses The Mountain Wreath depicts three distinct, opposing civilizations: the heroic-patriarchal classical Montenegro, the oriental-Islamic Ottoman Empire, and the west-European Venetian civilization.

The poem is constructed around a single, allegedly historical event, that took place on a particular Christmas Day in the early 18th century, during Metropolitan Danilo's rule: the mass execution of Montenegrins who had converted to Islam, known as "The Inquisition of the Turkicized" (Истрага Потурица or Istraga Poturica). Despite the difficulty of proving that an event of such magnitude and in such manner as described by Njegoš ever took place in Montenegro, the poem's main theme is a subject of significant political and ideological debate. Recently published History of Montenegro tells us that such an event initiated by Metropolitan Danilo occurred in 1707, but was highly localized in character, happening only in Ćeklići clan, one of over twenty tribes of Old Montenegro.

The fact that Njegoš used this event only as a general framework, without bothering about the exact historical data, underscores his concern with an issue that preoccupied him throughout his entire life and which was in line with Romantic thought: the struggle against Ottoman domination. He subjects the entire plot and all characters to this central idea.

In his foreword to the first English edition of the poem in 1930, Anglicist Vasa D. Mihajlović argues that much of the action and many characters in The Mountain Wreath point at similarities with Njegoš and his own time, indicating that it is safe to assume that many of the thoughts and words of Bishop Danilo and Abbot Stephen reflect Njegoš's own, and that the main plot of the play illuminates his overriding ambition to free his people and enable them to live in peace and dignity. Njegoš is angry because, together with other Montenegrins, he is forced to wage a constant battle for survival of the Montenegrin state, its freedom, its traditions and culture against a much stronger opponent. For him, the Islamization of Montenegrins represents the initial stage in the process of dissolving the traditional socio-cultural values that are so typical for Montenegro, and he condemns the converts for not being conscious of that fact.

The basic theme of The Mountain Wreath is the struggle for freedom, justice and dignity. The characters fight to correct a local flaw in their society – the presence of turncoats whose allegiance is to a foreign power bent on conquest – but they are at the same time involved in a struggle between good and evil. Pointing at the ideals that should concern all mankind, Njegoš expresses a firm belief in man and in his basic goodness and integrity. He also shows that man must forever fight for his rights and for whatever he attains, for nothing comes by chance.

The main themes of "The Mountain Wreath" can be divided into three interlaced categories:

1. Ideas that call for national awakening and unification of Montenegrin Serb people in the struggle for freedom
2. Ideas that reflect folk wisdom, traditional ethical values and a heroic, epic view of life and value systems
3. Ideas that represent Njegoš's personal thoughts and philosophical views of nature, people and society. Thoughts about never-ending battle between everything in nature, rectitude, vice and virtue, good and evil, honour and shame, duty and sacrifice.

Employing a decasyllabilic metre, the poem is written in the pure language of Serbian epic folk poetry. Aside from many powerful metaphors, striking images, and a healthy dose of humour which enlivens an otherwise sombre and often tragic atmosphere, the poem also features numerous profound thoughts, frequently expressed in the laconic proverbial manner, with many verses later becoming famous proverbs, for example:

"When things go well 'tis easy to be good,
In suffering one learns who is the hero!" (137–138)

=== Background ===
During the Great War of Vienna European powers united with the goal of weakening Ottoman influence and pursued a policy of enforcing Christian populations. In 1690, Patriarch Arseny III Čarnojević encouraged Serbs to revolt against the Ottomans. During the same year, a Montenegrin movement of liberation began, initiated by Venice, thus creating resentment between Christians and Muslims leading to the events. Danilo I then decided, after a series of severe conflicts, that the Muslims and Christians could no longer live together. In the plot of The Mountain Wreath, two assemblies of Christian Montenegrin chieftains gather, one on the eve of Pentecost, and the other on the Nativity of the Virgin Mary, with the decision to drive out the Turks. Some Balkan historians doubt the massacre ever occurred.

=== Massacre ===
According to Montenegrin folklore, the massacre was carried out on Christmas Eve, however there are disagreements of the date of the massacre, stretching from 1702 and 1709–1711. The main driver was Bishop Danilo Šćepćević, native of Njeguši, who was elected as bishop in 1697 and consecrated by Arsenius III Čarnojević in 1700 in Secu. Danilo gathered the chieftains and ordered them to exterminate "native Turks" who refused to be baptized. Serb historian Vladimir Ćorović states that the action was directed by Vuk Borilović and the Martinović brothers, along with several bureaucrats. At Christmas, before dawn, they killed the Muslims of Cetinje. Thousands were massacred, but only one of the bishop's men was wounded. In the following days, many Muslims were expelled from surrounding settlements. Men, women and children were slaughtered.

=== Literature ===
Pavle Rak, a Serb-Slovenian journalist, described the massacre as a "total inversion of the meaning of Christmas celebration that should bring peace from God to the whole world" as Christian values were abandoned for politics. Author Rebecca West, an admirer of Montenegrin culture who published "Black Lamb and Grey Falcon" (1941), is described as an admirer of the alleged massacre. Literary critic Vojislav Nikčević stated that the poem was artistic with a lively spirit to make both the reader and the scholar experience the depicted event as reality.

== Ideological controversy ==
Historian Srđa Pavlović points out that The Mountain Wreath has been the subject of praise and criticism, frequently used to support diametrically opposing views. Regardless of their political agendas, ideological preferences or religious persuasions, every new generation of South Slav historians and politicians appropriates Njegoš's work hoping to find enough quotations to validate their own views.

According to Pavlović Serbian nationalists intellectuals use it as a historical justification in their anti-Ottoman core value concepts of Greater Serbia, Croatian nationalists seems as the ultimate statement of the Oriental nature of South Slavs living east of the Drina river, reinforcing political stereotypes, and Islamic authors view the Mountain Wreath as a manual for ethnic cleansing and fratricidal murder. Montenegrin independentists largely shy away from any interpretation of Njegoš's poetry, and only on occasion discuss its literal and linguistic merits.

Timothy Winter, a leading British Muslim convert and scholar of Islam, maintains a view that The Mountain Wreath draws on ancient, violently Islamophobic sentiments. He views Ottoman rule over medieval Christian Serbia as an effective guard against crusading warriors of Western Catholicism, stating that the poem views "Muslim's repeated pleads for coexistence simply as satanic temptations, the smile of Judas, which the Metropolitan Danilo finally overcomes by celebrating the massacre at the end".

Michael Sells, an American professor of Islamic History and Literature of Serbian descent, shares a similar view, stating that the poem, a required reading in all schools in pre-war Yugoslavia, is notable for its celebration of ethnic cleansing. In his view, it "denotes Slavic Muslims as Christ-Killers, and plays a significant role in ethnic conflict and Bosnian War of the 1990s", pointing out that The Mountain Wreath is memorized and quoted by radical Serb nationalists of the 1990s.

According to British Jewish reporter and political analyst Tim Judah "there was another side to The Mountain Wreath far more sinister than its praise of tyrannicide. With its call for the extermination of those Montenegrins who had converted to Islam, the poem was also a paean to ethnic cleansing ... it helps explain how the Serbian national consciousness has been moulded and how ideas of national liberation are inextricably linked with killing your neighbour and burning his village."

Regarding the claims about the poem's influence in ethnic cleansing, Pavlović argues that it suffices to say that, at present, some 20% of the Montenegrin population is of Islamic faith, and that Montenegrins of the Islamic faith and their socio-cultural heritage have been in the past and are at present an integral part of the general matrix of Montenegrin society, as seen in Montenegro demographics.

Pavlović argues that Njegoš the politician was trying to accomplish the restructuring of a tribal society into a nation in accordance with the concept of national awakening in the 19th century. Pavlović proposes reading The Mountain Wreath as a tale of a long-gone heroic tribal society whose depicted state of affairs had little in common with the Montenegro of Njegoš's time and has nothing in common with contemporary Montenegro. However, The Mountain Wreath does speak volumes about political, social, cultural and economic conditions in Montenegro during the early 19th century, and about Njegoš's efforts to advocate the ideas of pan-Slavism and the Illyrian Movement. "The Mountain Wreath" is an important literary achievement and cannot be viewed exclusively as national literature because it deals with issues much broader than the narrow margins of Montenegrin political and cultural space, and in Pavlović's view, should not be read outside the context of the time of its inception, nor from the perspective of one book.

== See also ==
- Montenegrin–Ottoman War (1876–78)
- Exodus of Muslims from Serbia
