= Miodrag Linta =

Serbian politician and activist

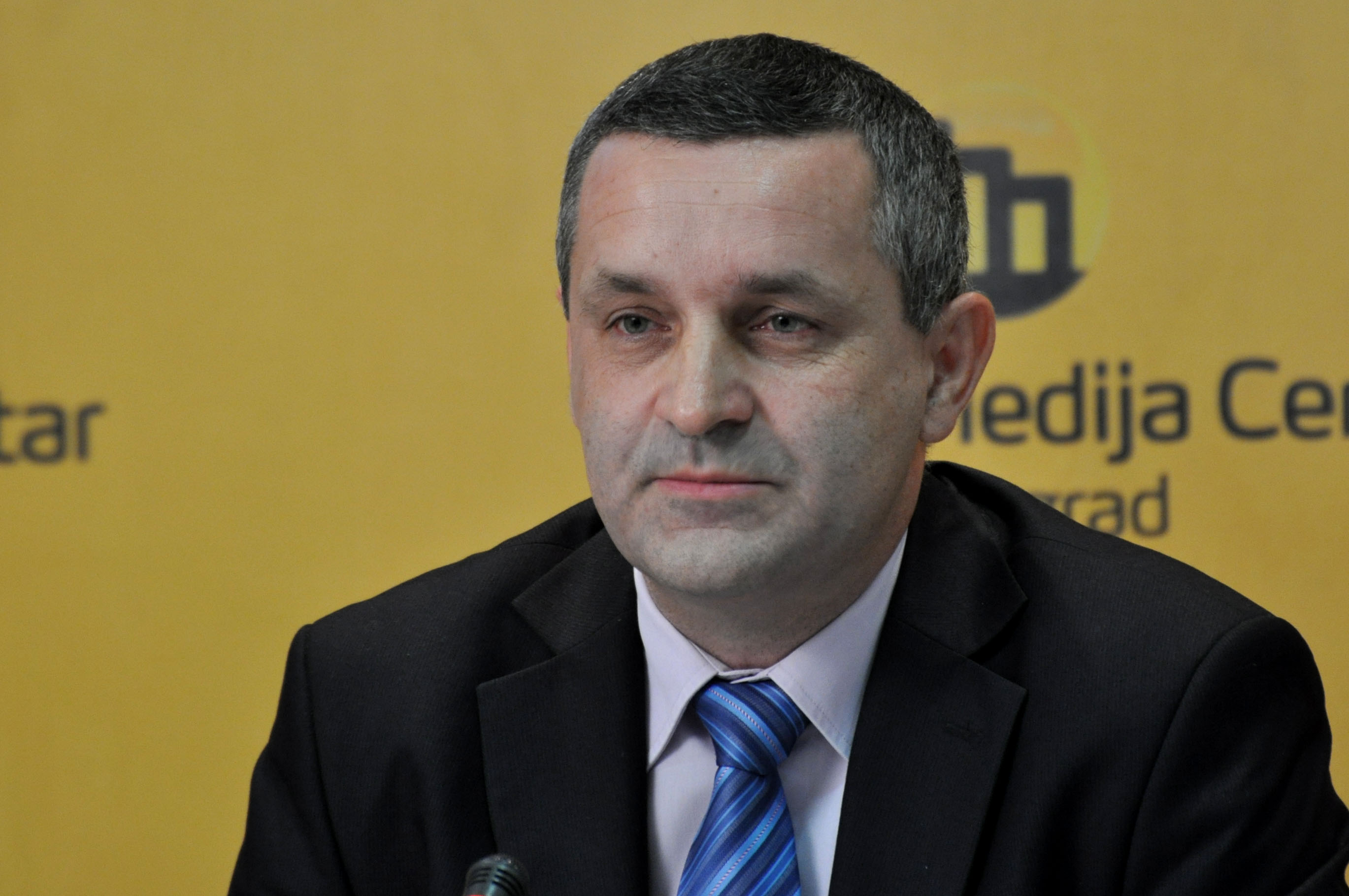
- Linta in 2012

Member of the National Assembly of the Republic of Serbia
- Incumbent
- Assumed office 2012

Personal details
- Born: 1969 (age 56–57) Karlovac; Socialist Federal Republic of Yugoslavia
- Party: Serbian Progressive Party

Miodrag Linta (Serbian Cyrillic: Миодраг Линта; born 1969) is a Serbian politician and activist. He is a prominent figure representing the interests of Serbs expelled from Croatia during the Yugoslav Wars of the 1990s. Linta has also been a member of the National Assembly of Serbia since 2012, serving as a member of the parliamentary group of the Serbian Progressive Party, although he is not a party member.

== Early life and career ==
Linta was born in Karlovac, in what was then the Socialist Republic of Croatia in the Socialist Federal Republic of Yugoslavia. He completed undergraduate and post-graduate studies at the University of Belgrade Faculty of Philosophy and taught history in several Belgrade schools.

== Refugee rights and Serbia–Croatia relations ==
Linta has been a prominent figure in calling for the prosecution of Croatian officials guilty of war crimes against Serbs during the early 1990s conflict between Serbia and Croatia and has sought to uphold the political and property rights of Serbs displaced from their homes in Croatia over the course of the conflict.

In May 2010, Linta led the Serb Democratic Forum in filing war crime charges with the Croatian state prosecution against six persons alleged to have been responsible for the ethnic cleansing of Serbs from twenty-six villages in 1991. He later approved the decision of Serbian prosecutors to indict Croatian officials for war crimes committed against Serbs in Vukovar during the same year.

He welcomed the conviction of Croatian lieutenant general Ante Gotovina by the International Criminal Tribunal for the Former Yugoslavia in April 2011, saying that the ruling acknowledged that there was ethnic cleansing perpetrated against Serbs in Croatia. He subsequently led a protest march through Belgrade after Gotovina's conviction was overturned in late 2012, and he condemned Croatian president Kolinda Grabar-Kitarović's decision to appoint Gotovina as an advisor in 2015.

Linta opposed the European Parliament's declaration on the Srebrenica massacre as an act of genocide. He acknowledged that Serb forces had perpetrated a significant war crime in Srebrenica but argued that to emphasize one crime over others would not contribute to reconciliation in the region. He instead urged the Serbian parliament to approve a resolution condemning all crimes committed during the Yugoslav Wars and called for "all those who committed war crimes, regardless of ethnic and religious belonging [to] be brought to justice."

Linta encouraged Croatian Serb refugees to participate in the 2009 Croatian local elections, so as to permit Serb representatives to serve in positions of local authority and allow for the exercise of minority rights in the country. He and other Serb community leaders were subsequently prohibited from entering Croatia in November 2011 to attend an election rally for the group Our Party from Borovo in Vukovar. The Croatian ministry of the interior asserted that their presence would upset local residents and could disturb the public order. Linta protested the decision and called on the Croatian government to condemn the ministry's actions; his response was supported by the Progressive Party leadership.

He submitted an open letter to the Croatian Embassy in Belgrade in May 2011, expressing "regret that the Croatian parliament has not adopted a declaration on respect for the human rights of the expelled Serbs." He was quoted at the time as saying, "Unfortunately, Serbs in Croatia are still treated as second-class citizens. Croatian authorities are not showing the will to find a comprehensive and lasting solution to the refugee issue." He wrote an open letter to German chancellor Angela Merkel shortly thereafter, requesting her assistance in the matter.

Linta expressed concern in late 2013 that pro-Ustaša beliefs were becoming normalized in Croatia, with anti-Serb sentiments being prevalent in some aspects of society. The following year, he criticized Croatian president Grabar-Kitarović for saying that Serbs who lived in Croatia were in fact Croats, describing the statement as chauvinist and provocative. On another occasion, he described the Croatian state's actions against Serb communities in the early 1990s as genocidal, saying, "Mass crimes against Serbs... were part of the Croatian leaders' plan aimed at eliminating Serbs so they would disappear from areas where they lived for centuries.

In September 2015, Linta joined other delegates from Serbia and Croatia in commemorating the deaths of sixteen elderly Serb civilians in Varivode and Gošić in the aftermath of Operation Storm.

== Parliamentarian ==
Linta received the nineteenth position on the Progressive Party's Let's Get Serbia Moving electoral list in the 2012 Serbian parliamentary election. During the campaign, he said that he joined the Progressive coalition because of his dissatisfaction with the manner in which Boris Tadić's government was handling refugee issues. The Progressive-led list won seventy-three mandates and subsequently formed a coalition government with the Socialist Party of Serbia and other parties; Linta was elected and served with the government's parliamentary majority. He was re-elected in the parliamentary elections of 2014 and 2016. The Serbian parliamentary website indicates that he served as a political member of the Coalition of Refugee Associations in the Republic of Serbia in his first term but that he has served as a non-party member of the assembly since that time.

During his second term in parliament, Linta chaired the assembly committee on the diaspora and Serbs in the region. In the 2016–20 parliament, he was the deputy chair of that committee, a member of the committee on Kosovo-Metohija, a deputy member of the foreign affairs committee, and a member of the parliamentary friendship groups with Belarus, China, India, Kazakhstan, North Macedonia, Russia, and Spain.

He received the seventy-eighth position on the Progressive Party's Aleksandar Vučić — For Our Children coalition list in the 2020 Serbian parliamentary election and was elected to a fourth term when the list won a landslide majority with 188 mandates. He is now a member of the diaspora committee and the committee on Kosovo-Metohija, a deputy member of the committee on human and minority rights and gender equality, and a member of the parliamentary friendship groups with the Bahamas, Botswana, Cameroon, the Central African Republic, Comoros, the Dominican Republic, Ecuador, Equatorial Guinea, Eritrea, Greece, Grenada, Guinea-Bissau, Jamaica, Kyrgyzstan, Laos, Liberia, Madagascar, Mali, Mauritius, Mozambique, Nauru, Nicaragua, Nigeria, Palau, Papua New Guinea, Paraguay, the Republic of Congo, Romania, Russia, Saint Vincent and the Grenadines, Sao Tome and Principe, the Solomon Islands, South Sudan, Spain, Sri Lanka, Sudan, Suriname, Togo, Trinidad and Tobago, Uruguay, and Uzbekistan.
