= Biovičino Selo =

Biovičino Selo Биовичино Село (Serbian)
- Village
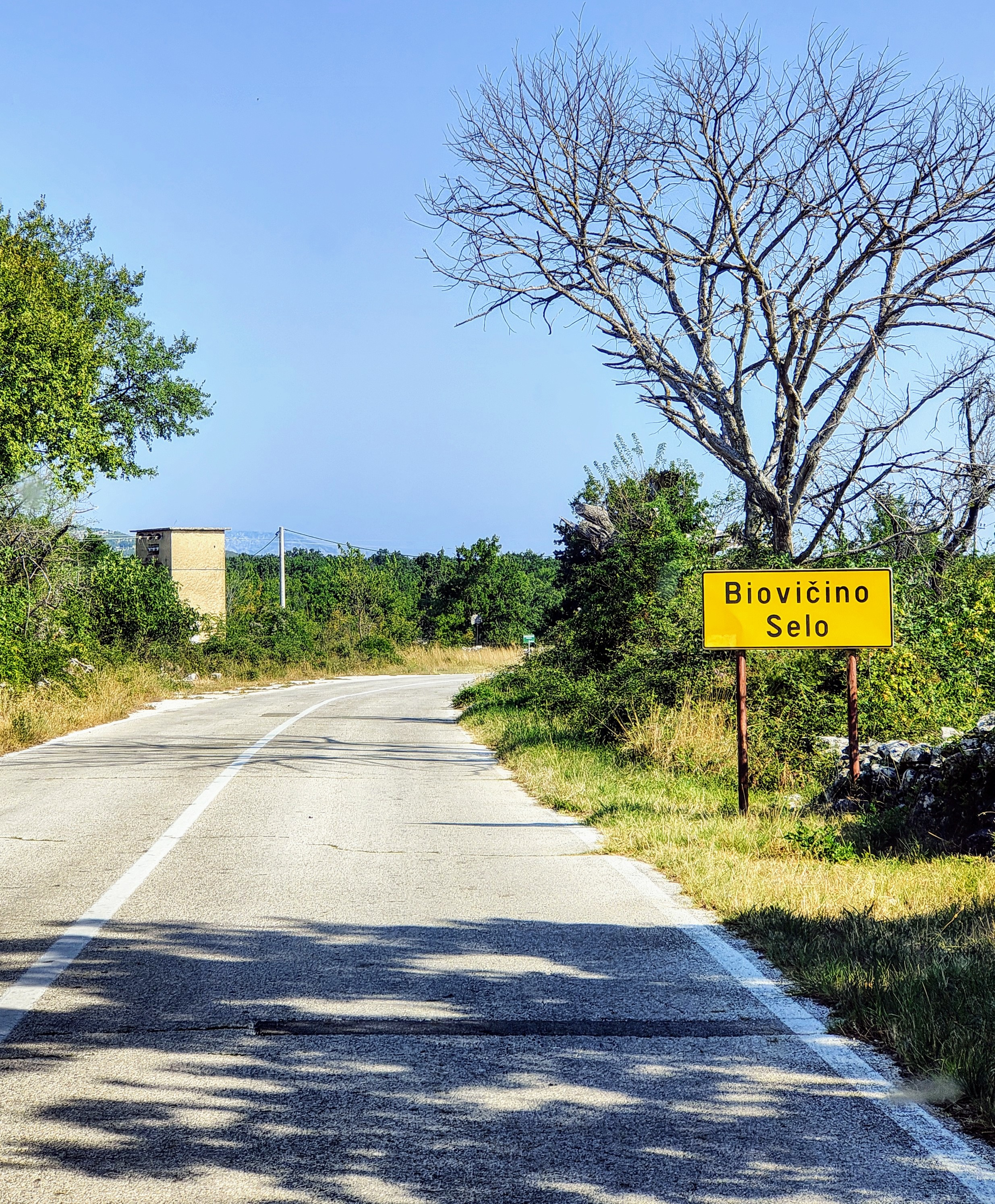
- Interactive map of Biovičino Selo
- Location of Biovičino Selo in Croatia
- Coordinates: 44°03′N 15°55′E
- Country: Croatia
- Region: Dalmatia
- County: Šibenik-Knin County
- Municipality: Kistanje

Area
  - Total: 21.9 km^{2} (8.5 sq mi)
- Elevation: 264 m (866 ft)

Population (2021)
  - Total: 133
  - Density: 6.07/km^{2} (15.7/sq mi)
- Time zone: UTC+1 (CET)
  - Summer (DST): UTC+2 (CEST)
- Postal code: 22305 Kistanje
- Area code: (+385) 22

Biovičino Selo (Serbian Cyrillic: Биовичино Село) is a village located in the municipality of Kistanje, in the Šibenik-Knin County, Croatia. According to the population census from 2011, 223 inhabitants lived in the settlement. According to preliminary data from the last census in 2021, 129 inhabitants lived in the village.

== Geography ==
Biovičino Selo is located in central Bukovica, Northern Dalmatia, about 12 km north of Kistanje.

== History ==
The village was initially named Modrino Selo, and later became divided into present-day Biovičino Selo and Modrino Selo.

According to the 1528-1530 Ottoman defter the village Modri had 8 Christian houses, being part of the nahiye of Zrmanja of Roman Catholic "Vlachs of Istria" who recently returned to old estates from Istria where temporarily escaped the Ottoman conquest of Croatia.

In 1550 the wider area of Kistanje (including this village) was part of the djamaat of knez Bijoviče, son of Vučko after whom the Biovičino Selo got named, and with whom most probably arrived Orthodox population. In the late 17th century was still known by its old name "Modrino selo" (Modrina villa), and became settled by 15 new families who had a dispute with serdar Jovan Sinobad (cousin of local Turk named Modre).

In 1704 the Serbian Orthodox Church dedicated to St. Peter and Paul was the site of the Kuridža's Rebellion against the Republic of Venice due to taxation on newly conquered territory, which included a large peasant Orthodox Christian (Serb) population.

=== World War II ===
During the Second World War, the inhabitants of the village were mostly in favor of the Partisan movement. The 14th Dalmatian brigade was formed in this village on Vidovdan 1944.

=== Republic of Serbian Krajina ===
The town was part of the former large municipality of Knin. Biovičino Selo was located in the Republic of Serbian Krajina from the breakup of Yugoslavia until August 1995 where it was absorbed into Croatia. The majority of the Serb population left in August 1995 during the Croatian Operation Storm.

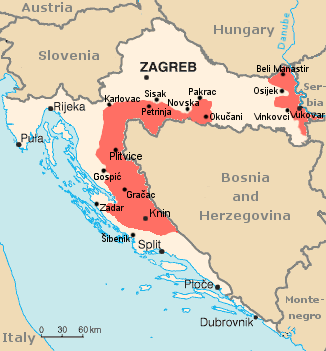
Map of Republic of Serbian Krajina (1991 - 1995)

== Demographics ==
According to the 1991 census, 99.58% of the village population were ethnic Serbs (944/948). According to the 2001 census, Biovičino Selo had 186 inhabitants. According to the 2011 census, the village of Biovičino Selo has a population of 223. This represents 25.52% of its pre-war population according to the 1991 census.

Population change 1857–2011
v

population	651	673	716	833	933	980	1319	1113	1205	1338	1348	1282	1113	948	186	223
	1857	1869	1880	1890	1900	1910	1921	1931	1948	1953	1961	1971	1981	1991	2001	2011

Sources: Croatian Bureau of Statistics publications

== Religion ==
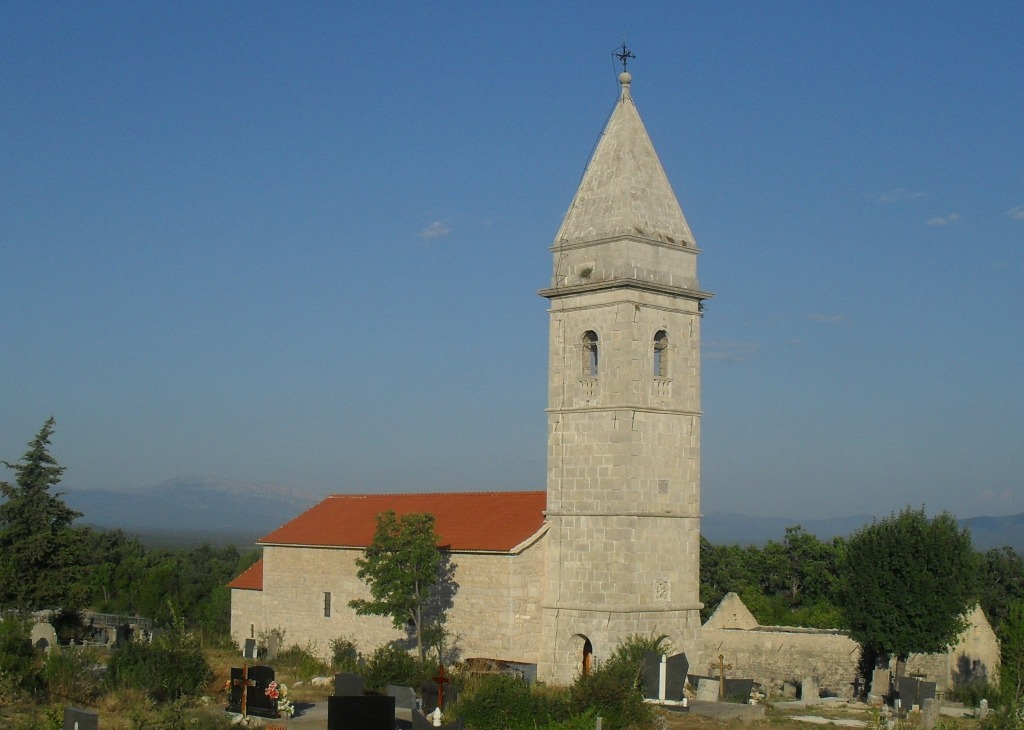
Serbian Orthodox Church

Nikodim Milaš claimed that the Serbian Orthodox Church dedicated to St. Peter and Paul was built between year 1524 and 1537. Although mentioned as an Orthodox Church in the mid-16th century Ottoman defters, in the early 16th century certainly was Roman Catholic, and the architectural style, as well found Croatian interlace in the village, reveals that its Orthodox foundation was a renovation of a medieval-Gothic church. The church was in 1697 described by Bishop of Nin as wide and ancient with astounding and high bell tower (satis latam et antiquam, quae habet valde altum campanile, et pulchrum). The old bell tower was re-built in the 19th century probably to the original dimensions.

During the 1995 war, the church suffered considerable damage, as well as the centuries-old cemetery located in the church yard.

Petrovdan is the feast day of the St. Peter and Paul church and the village. Celebrated yearly with religious traditions, family gatherings and a marathon.

== Education ==
Until 1995 Biovičino Selo had "Jovo Kablar" primary school which has reminded destroyed after the war.

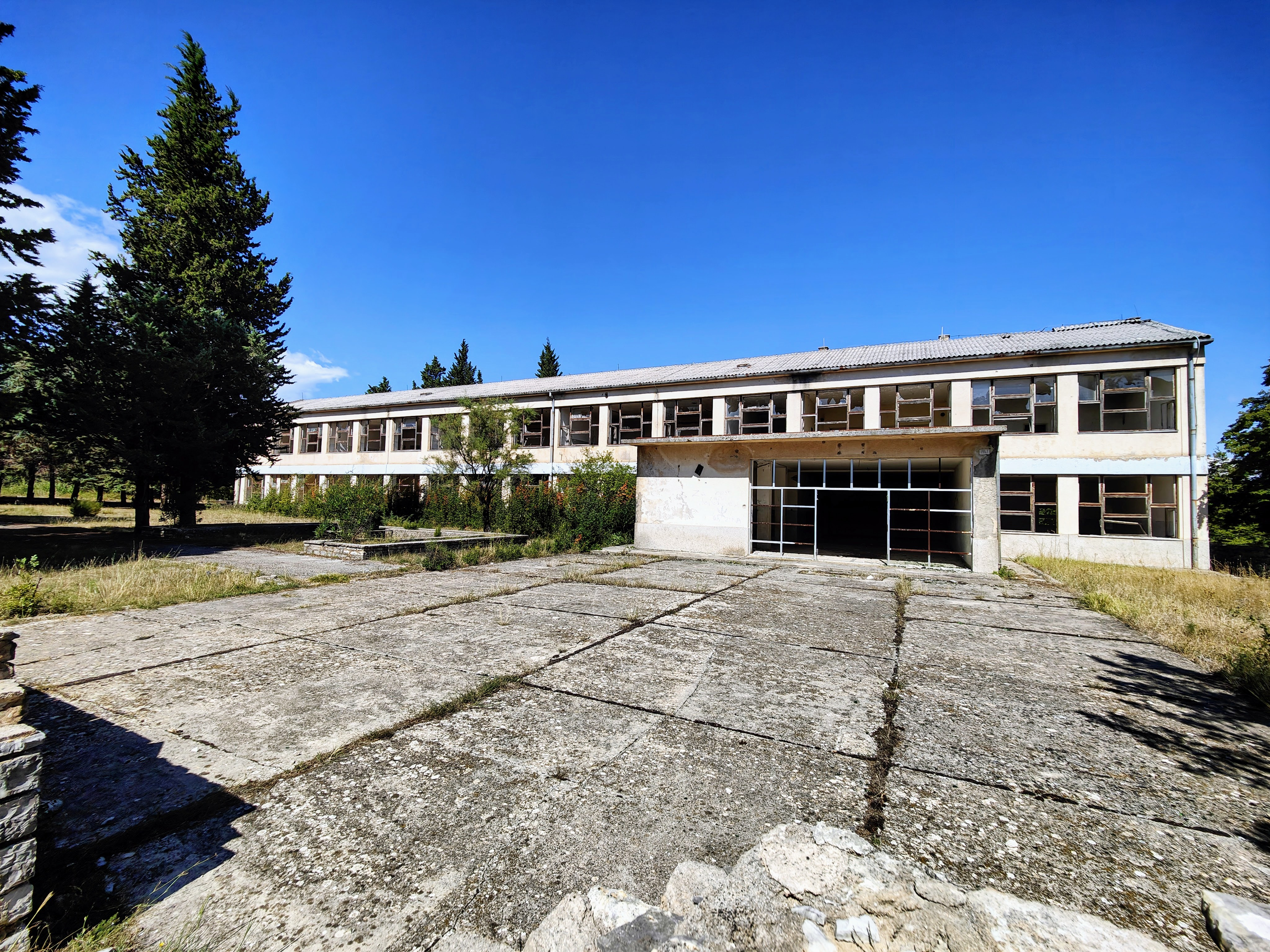
"Jovo Kablar" Primary School, now destroyed since 1995.

== Notable natives and residents ==
- Stevo Opačić, national hero of Yugoslavia

== Gallery ==
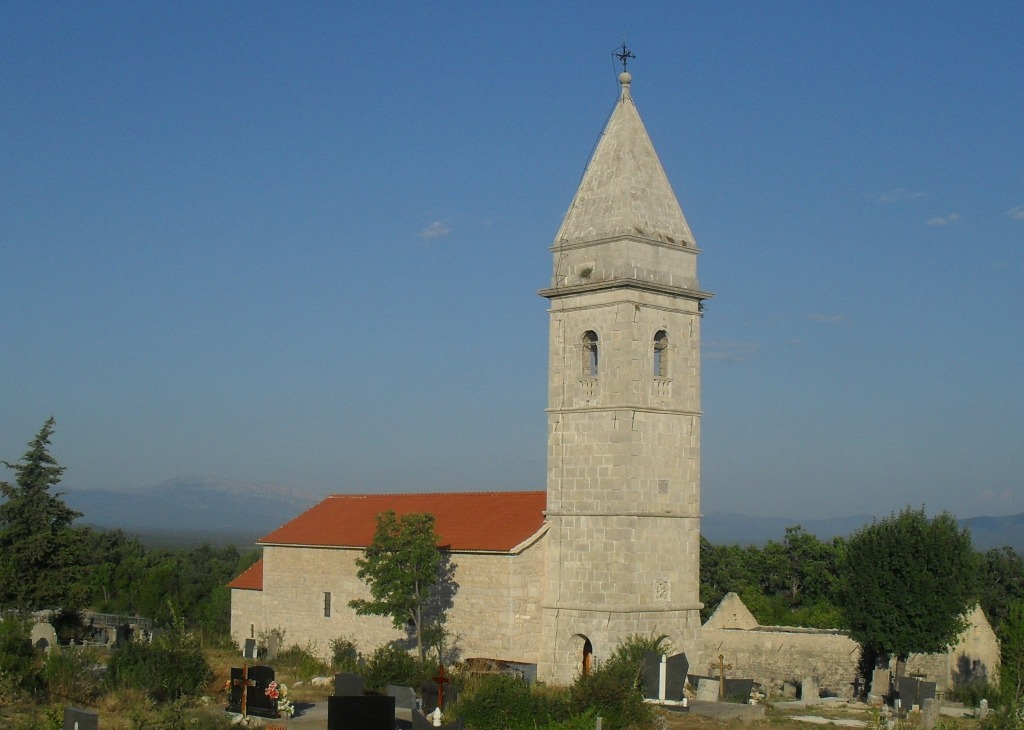
Serbian Orthodox Church dedicated to St. Peter and Paul

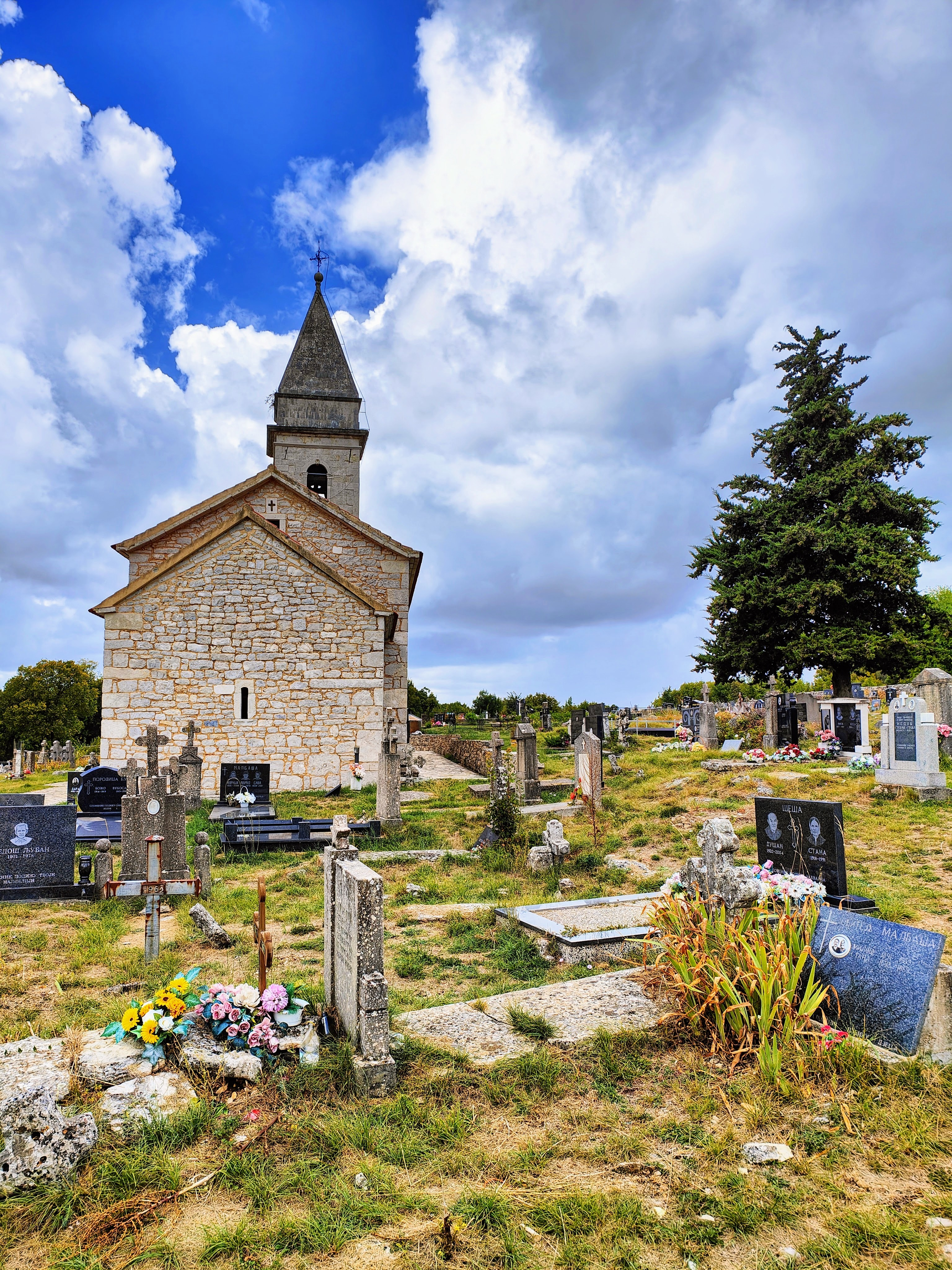
Serbian Orthodox Church dedicated to St. Peter and Paul originally

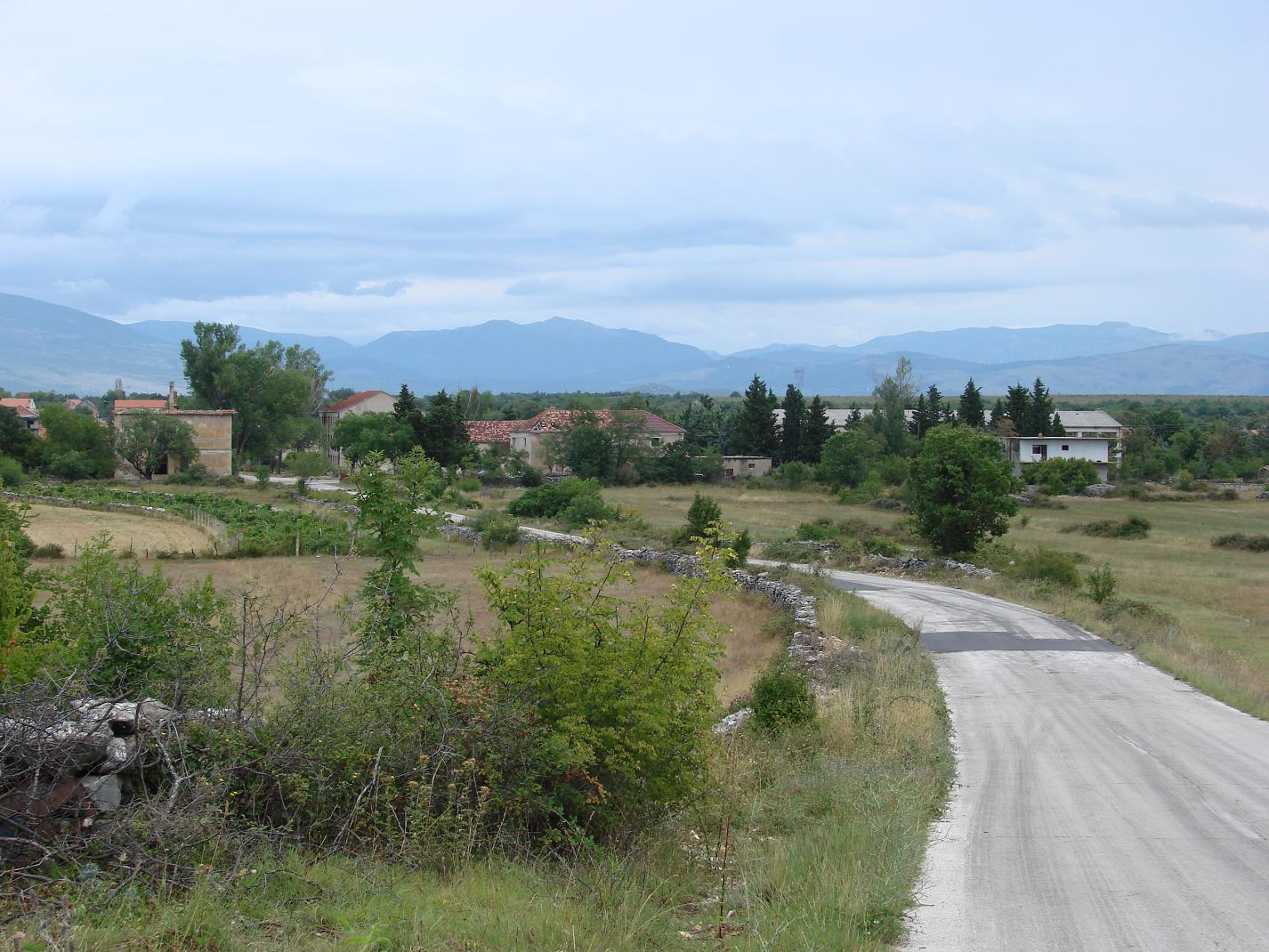
View of Centre of Biovičino Selo

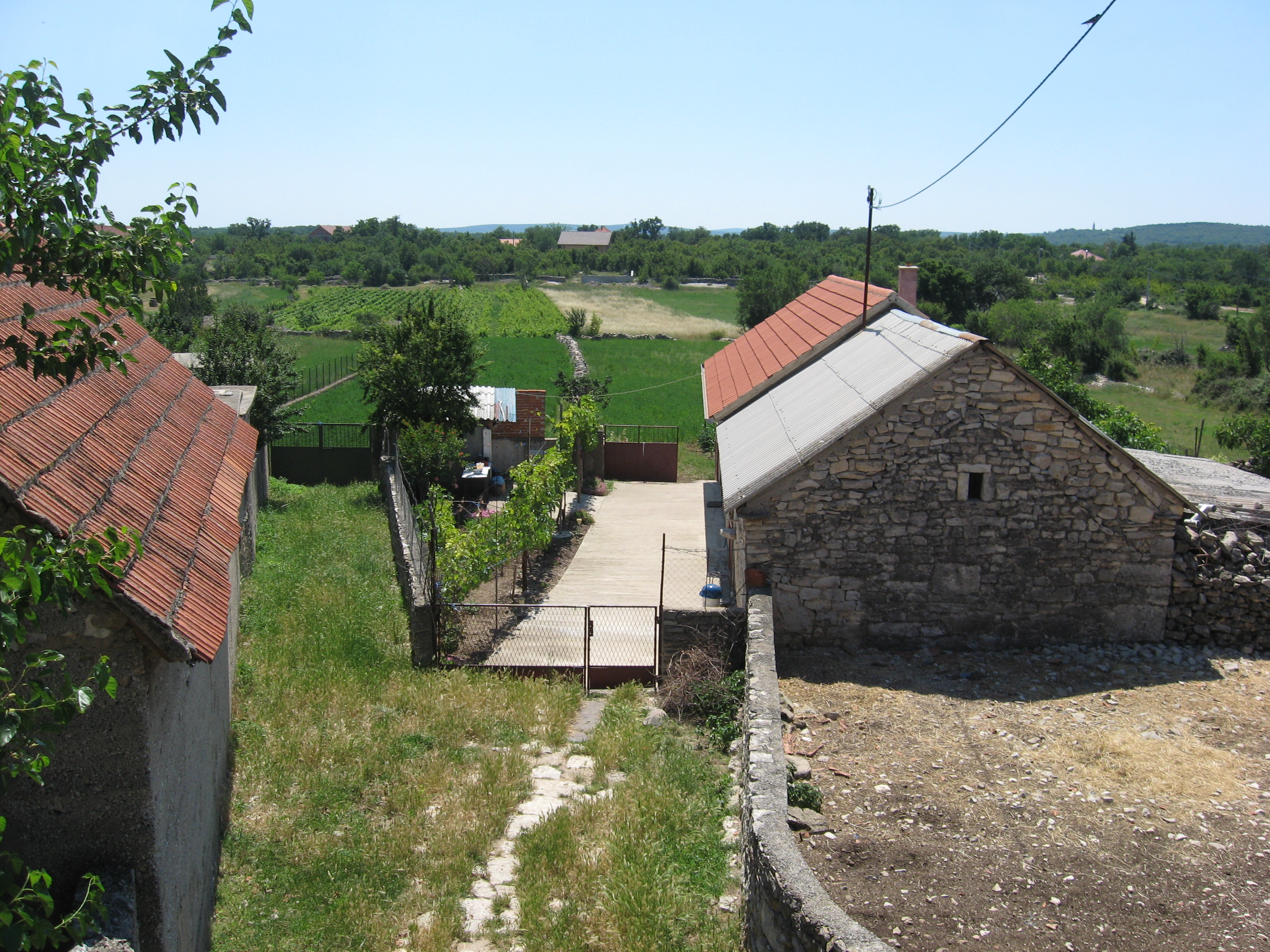

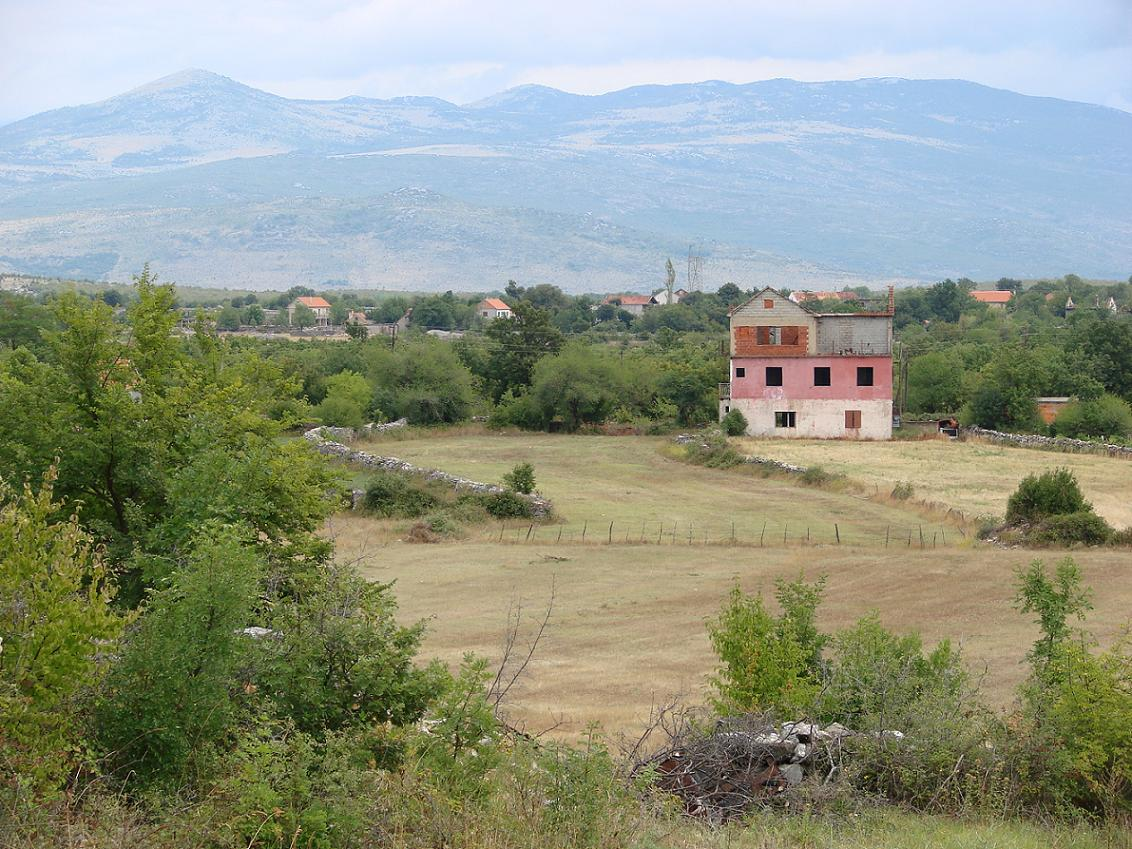
Sorgić

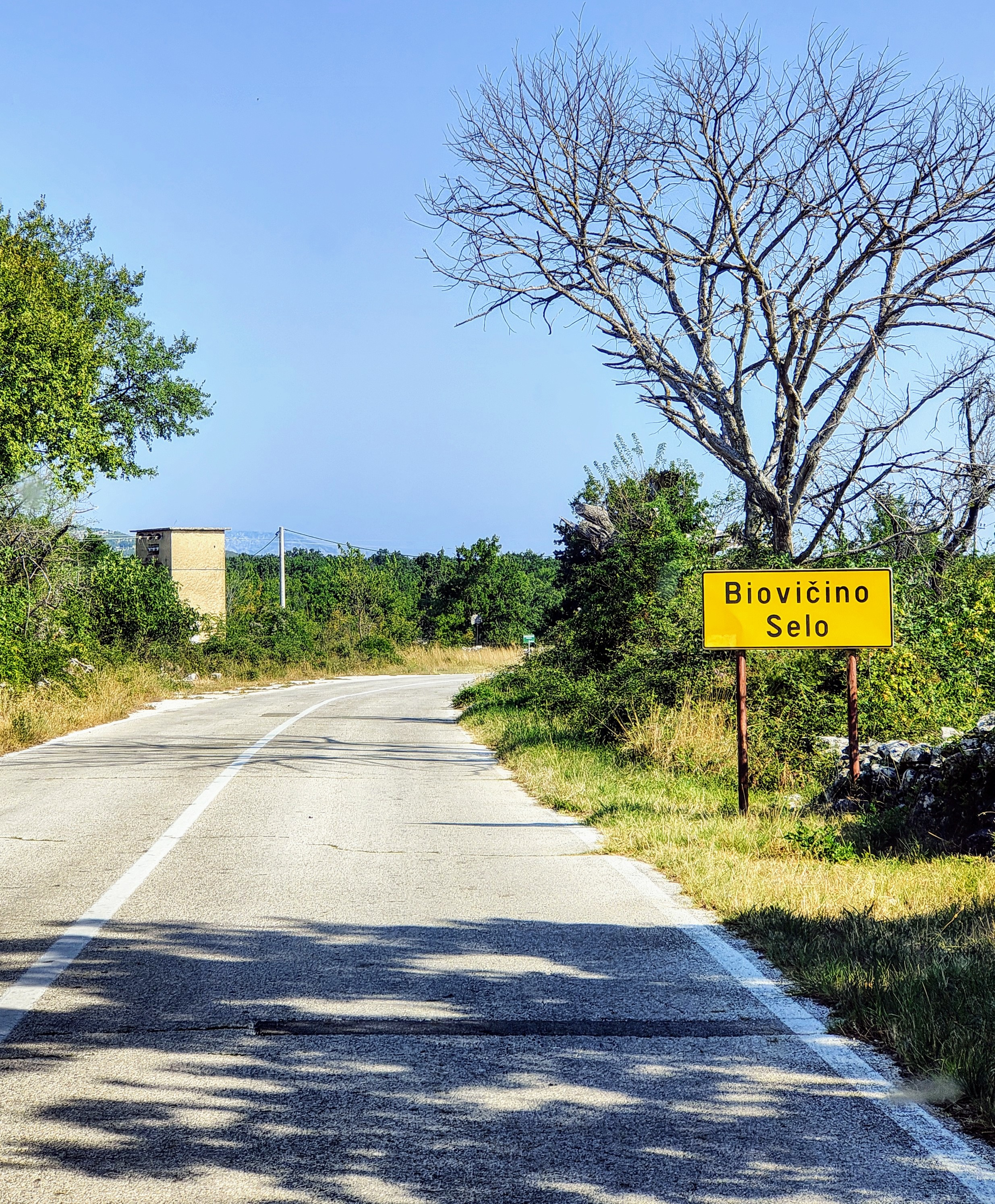
Sign entering Biovičino Selo

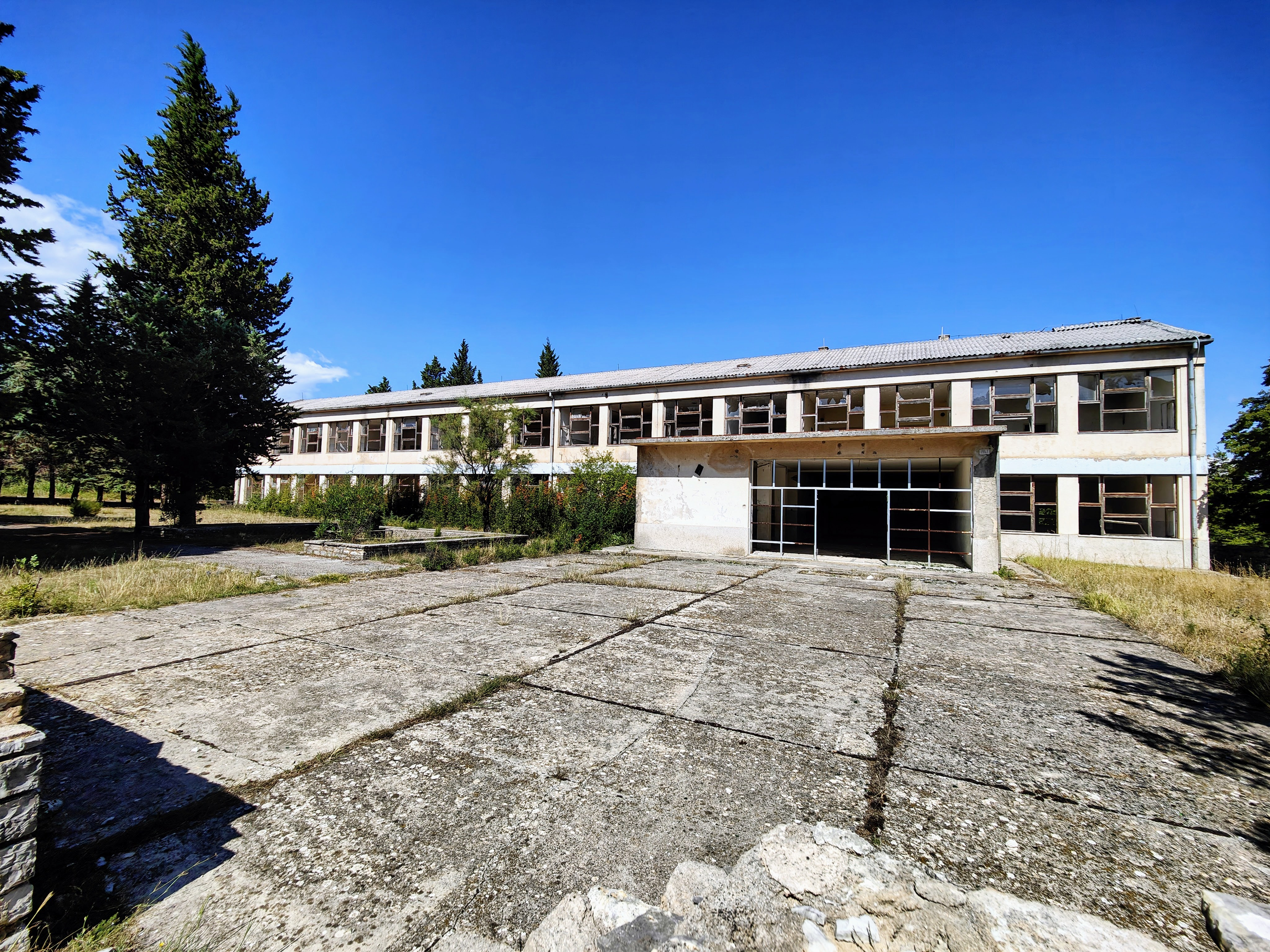
"Jovo Kablar" Primary School, now destroyed since 1995.
