= Parčić =

Parčić Парчић (Serbian)
- Village
- Location of Parčić in Croatia
- Coordinates: 44°05′N 15°51′E
- Country: Croatia
- County: Šibenik-Knin County
- Municipality: Kistanje

Area
  - Total: 18.6 km^{2} (7.2 sq mi)
- Elevation: 334 m (1,096 ft)

Population (2021)
  - Total: 2
  - Density: 0.11/km^{2} (0.28/sq mi)
- Time zone: UTC+1 (CET)
  - Summer (DST): UTC+2 (CEST)
- Postal code: 22305 Kistanje

Parčić is a small village located in the region called Bukovica, 14 km northwest of Kistanje, in the continental part of Šibenik-Knin County, Croatia.

In the village there is a church from the 13th century.
