= Zečevo =

Zečevo may refer to:

- Zečevo Rogozničko, a village in Croatia
- Zečevo, Kistanje, a village in Croatia
