= Petrova crkva =

Petrova crkva or Petar's Church may refer to:

- Church of the Holy Apostles Peter and Paul, Ras, a church in Serbia
- Church of St. Peter, Zagreb, a church in Croatia at the Vlaška Street

== See also ==
- Church of the Holy Apostles Peter and Paul, Biovičino Selo, a Serbian Orthodox church in Croatia
- Church of St. Peter the Apostle, Split, the co-cathedral of the Archdiocese of Split-Makarska, a Catholic church in Croatia
- St. Peter's Church
