= Kistanje =

Municipality in Šibenik-Knin County, Croatia

- Municipality
- Općina Kistanje; Општина Кистање; Municipality of Kistanje
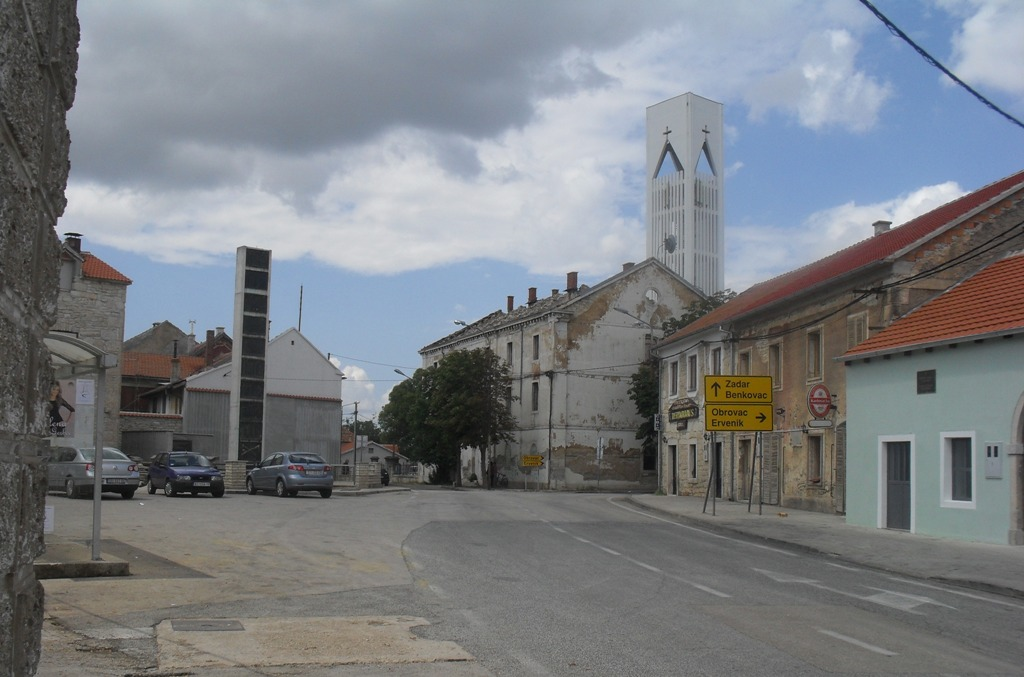
- Downtown Kistanje in 2012
- Interactive map of Kistanje
- Location of Kistanje within Croatia
- Coordinates: 43°58′53″N 15°57′54″E
- Country: Croatia
- Region: Dalmatia (Dalmatian Hinterland)
- County: Šibenik-Knin County

Government
  - Mayor: Goran Reljić (SDSS)

Area
  - Municipality: 243.0 km^{2} (93.8 sq mi)
  - Urban: 60.6 km^{2} (23.4 sq mi)

Population (2021)
  - Municipality: 2,650
  - Density: 10.9/km^{2} (28.2/sq mi)
  - Urban: 1,638
  - Urban density: 27.0/km^{2} (70.0/sq mi)
- Time zone: UTC+1 (CET)
  - Summer (DST): UTC+2 (CEST)
- Postal code: 22300 Knin
- Area code: 022
- Website: kistanje.hr

Kistanje (Croatian: Kistanje), is a village and municipality in Šibenik-Knin County, Croatia. It is located in Bukovica, a region of the Dalmatian Hinterland.

== Geography ==
Kistanje is located in the microregion of Bukovica, in the Dalmatian Hinterland. Kistanje is 28 kilometres (17 mi) from county seat Šibenik, 20 kilometres (12 mi) from Knin and 18 kilometres (11 mi) from Skradin. The Adriatic Sea is 25 kilometres (16 mi) to the south-west. The climate is Mediterranean, with an average of 27 °C in the summer and 8 °C in the winter.

== History ==
Kistanje was first mentioned in Latin as Kyztane in 1408. It originated close to the remains of a Roman camp Burnum and a medieval church. During the Middle Ages, including 1408, it was part of the district of Luka and it belonged to the estates of the Šubić family.

In the mid-15th century recorded as "Kistani", the village and surroundings were plundered by the Ottoman forces and in the 1530s fell in their hands, being part of the kadiluk of Skradin and Croatian vilayet (and under Ottoman control until late 17th century when became part of the Venetian Dalmatia). According to the 1528-1530 Ottoman defter the village Kistanji Polje had 4 Christian houses, being part of the nahiye of Zečevo of Roman Catholic "Vlachs of Istria" who recently returned to old estates from Istria where temporarily escaped the Ottoman conquest of Croatia. In 1550 the wider area of Kistanje was part of the djamaat of knez Bijoviče, son of Vučko with whom most probably arrived Orthodox population.

Kistanje was a trade center of this part of Bukovica. After the Kuridža's rebellion in 1704, the village was renamed Kvartir (Quartier), before being mentioned again as Kistanje (Chistagne) in the course of the 18th century. In the 19th and the first part of the 20th century, the village was the centre of a municipality that was abolished in the 1960s. The municipality and its territory were joined to the municipality of Knin.

During the Croatian War of Independence, local Serb rebels held the village until its capture by the Croatian Army during Operation Storm on 5 August 1995. During this period, the Church of Our Lady of Health was devastated, and most of the non-Serb population fled. The village remained under the control of so called Republic of Serbian Krajina until 1995, when it suffered heavy damage in battle, and some of the local civilians were killed (see Varivode massacre), while others fled.

In 1997, Kistanje became a municipality within the Šibenik-Knin County. In 1997, around 1,000 Croats from Janjevo in Kosovo were settled in the village. In 2003, the second Catholic church, the Church of Saint Nicholas was dedicated.

== Churches ==
According to Nikodim Milaš, the Orthodox church dedicated to St. Nicholas was built between 1524 and 1537, but these dates are based on the questionable chronicle of Simeon Končarević. The church was of pre-Ottoman origin and Roman Catholic in the early 16th century before conversion to Eastern Orthodoxy. The Croatian theologian Stanko Bačić considered Milaš's conclusions to be a product of his imagination, arguing that the village was settled by Roman Catholics until the beginning of the Cretan War, in the mid-17th century. However, according to historian Milenko Pekić, Bačić's assessment is naive and lacks a scientific basis. The second Orthodox church, dedicated to Sts Cyril and Methodius was built in 1888 while the Catholic church of Our Lady of Health was built in 1894.

== Population ==
In 2021, the municipality had 2,650 residents in the following 14 settlements:

- Biovičino Selo, population 133
- Đevrske, population 175
- Gošić, population 21
- Ivoševci, population 251
- Kakanj, population 32
- Kistanje, population 1638
- Kolašac, population 47
- Krnjeuve, population 64
- Modrino Selo, population 23
- Nunić, population 89
- Parčić, population 2
- Smrdelje, population 90
- Varivode, population 61
- Zečevo, population 24
Kistanje: Population trends 1857–2021
v

population	5970	5929	6620	7432	8648	9175	10584	10579	10851	11236	10840	9947	8451	7816	3038	3481	2650
	1857	1869	1880	1890	1900	1910	1921	1931	1948	1953	1961	1971	1981	1991	2001	2011	2021

Sources: Croatian Bureau of Statistics publications

51.89% of the total population were Serbs and 47.06% Croats.

In the 2011 census, there were 3,481 inhabitants of Kistanje municipality, 62.22% Serbs and 36.83% Croats.

=== Language ===
Serbian and Croatian are co-official at the municipal level. As of 2023, most of the legal requirements for the fulfillment of bilingual standards have not been carried out. Official buildings do have Cyrillic signage, but not street signs, traffic signs or seals. Cyrillic is not used on any official documents, nor are there public legal and administrative employees proficient in the script.

== Politics ==
The municipality council has 14 seats, out of which 10 are Independent Democratic Serb Party (SDSS), 3 are Croatian Democratic Union (HDZ), and 1 is Croatian Social Liberal Party (HSLS). The mayor of Kistanje, since 2012, is Goran Reljić (SDSS).

== Notable people ==
- Simo Dubajić

== Gallery ==
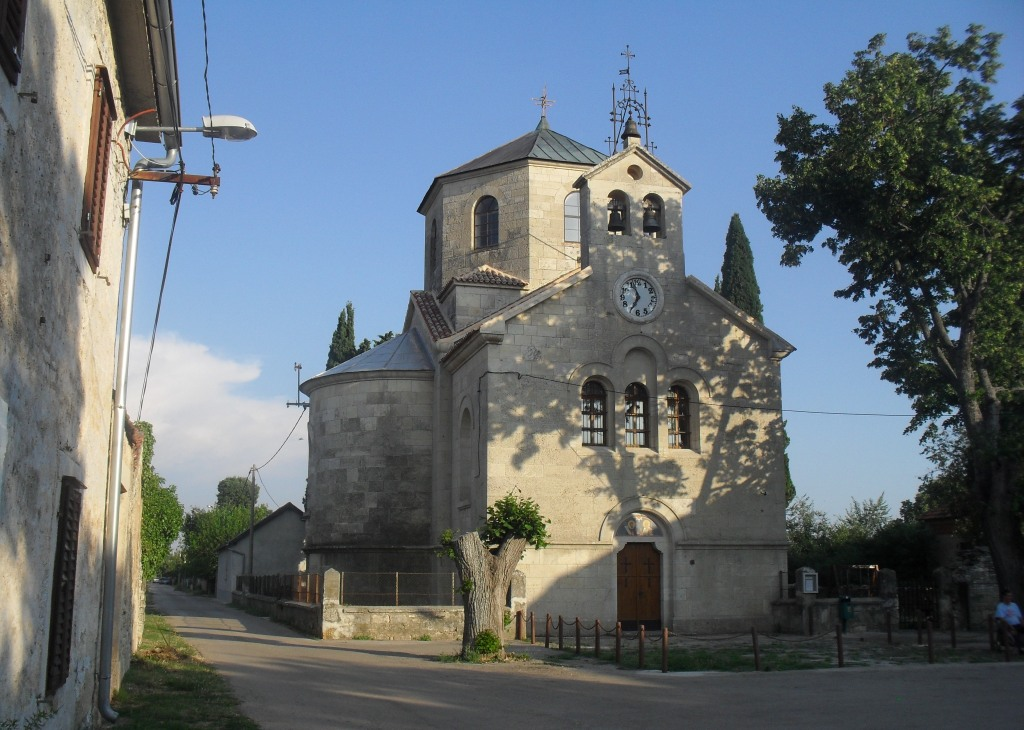
Orthodox church

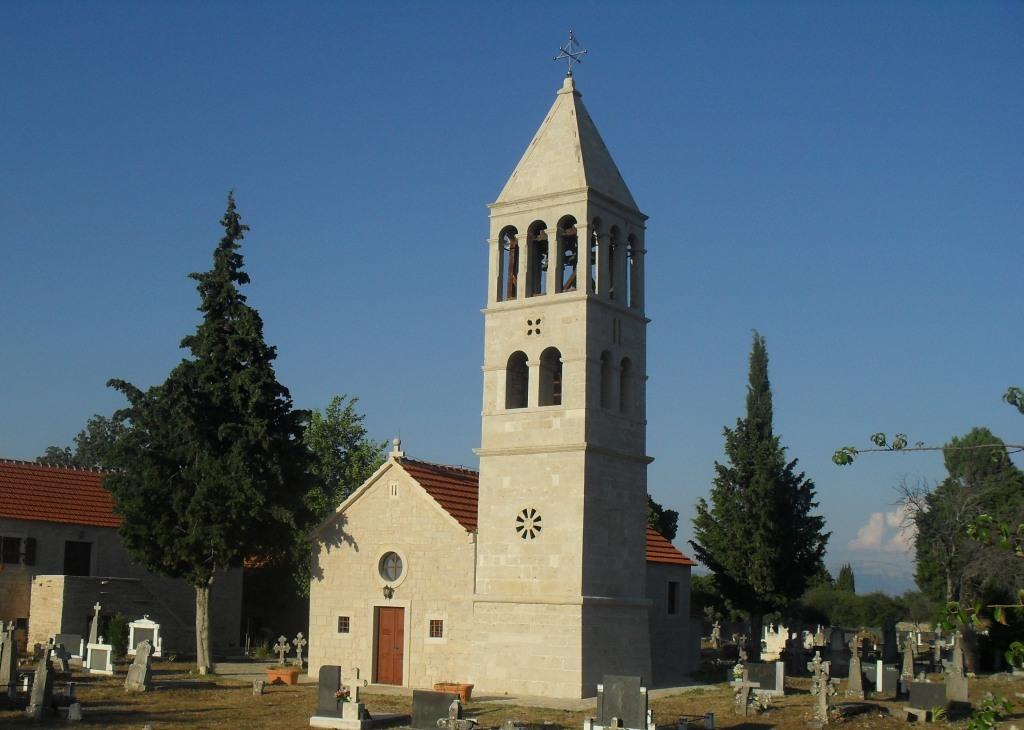
Orthodox church in Bezbradice

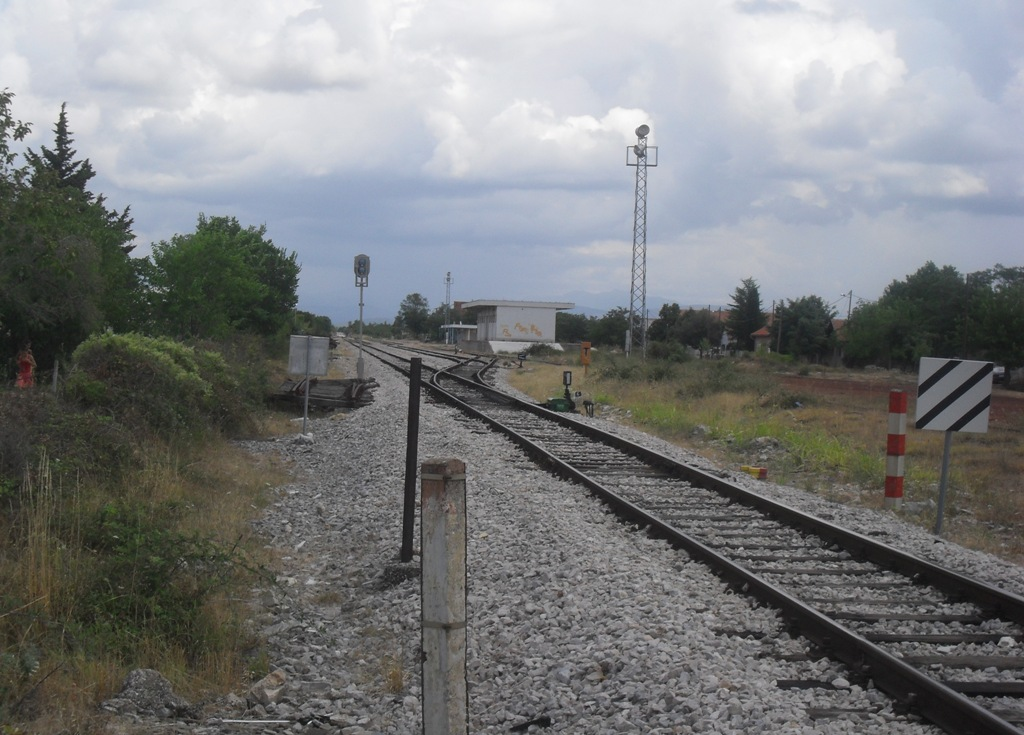
Railway station

== See also ==
- Burnum
- Krka Monastery, Serbian Orthodox monastery dedicated to the Archangel Michael located 2.5 km from Kistanje near the Krka river.
- Krka Manojlovac Waterfall
