= Nunić =

Nunić Нунић (Serbian)
- Village
- Interactive map of Nunić
- Location of Nunić in Croatia
- Coordinates: 44°1′30″N 15°51′30″E
- Country: Croatia
- County: Šibenik-Knin County
- Municipality: Kistanje

Area
  - Total: 16.4 km^{2} (6.3 sq mi)
- Elevation: 263 m (863 ft)

Population (2021)
  - Total: 89
  - Density: 5.4/km^{2} (14/sq mi)
- Time zone: UTC+1 (CET)
  - Summer (DST): UTC+2 (CEST)
- Postal code: 22305 Kistanje

Nunić is a village in the municipality of Kistanje, in the Bukovica region of Croatia.

== Notable structures ==
- Church of Saint Anthony of Padua
