= Gošić killings =

1995 mass killing in Gošić, Croatia

- Location: Gošić, Šibenik-Knin County
- Date: 27 August 1995
- Target: Elderly Croatian Serb villagers
- Attack type: Mass killing
- Deaths: 8
- Perpetrator: Croatian Army (HV)

The Gošić kllings refers to the mass murder of elderly Serb civilians from the village of Gošić in Šibenik-Knin County by members of the Croatian Army (HV) on 27 August 1995, approximately three weeks after Operation Storm.

== Background ==
By March 1991, tensions between Croats and Serbs escalated into the Croatian War of Independence. Following a referendum on independence that was largely boycotted by Croatian Serbs, the Croatian parliament officially adopted independence on 25 June. The Republic of Serb Krajina (RSK) declared its intention to secede from Croatia and join the Republic of Serbia while the Government of the Republic of Croatia declared it a rebellion. Between August 1991 and February 1992, the RSK initiated an ethnic cleansing campaign to drive out the Croat and non-Serb population from RSK-held territory, eventually expelling as many as 250,000 people according to Human Rights Watch. Croatian forces also engaged in ethnic cleansing against Serbs in Eastern and Western Slavonia and parts of the Krajina on a more limited scale. On 4 August 1995, the Croatian Army (HV) launched Operation Storm to retake the Krajina region which was completed successfully by 7 August. The Operation resulted in the exodus of approximately 200,000 Serbs from Krajina while those Serbs who were unable or unwilling to leave their homes, primarily the elderly, were subjected to various crimes. The ICTY puts the number of Serb civilians killed at 324.

== Killings ==
8 of the 12 remaining Serb villagers in the village of Gošić were shot and killed on 27 August 1995. The identified victims were 80-year old Milka Borak, 56-year old Dusan Borak, 77-year old Kosovka Borak, 70-year old Grozdana Borak, 75-year old Vasilj Borak, 81-year old Marija Borak and 70-year old Sava Borak. In October 1995, UN human rights workers matched the names of the five victims to names on crosses in the Knin cemetery. A memorial bearing the names of the eight victims was later added to the village. In August 2019, the deputy leader of the Serbian National Council read a traditional statement of commemoration next to the memorial for the 24th anniversary of Operation Storm.

== Legal proceedings ==
The Croatian authorities publicly acknowledged the murders following the disclosure of the Varivode massacre. On 18 October 1995, the Croatian Interior Minister announced that they had arrested thirteen persons suspected of having committed crimes in the villages of Gošić and Varivode. A combined trial for murders in the villages of Varivode, Gošić and Zrmanja was held and six former Croatian Army officers were found not guilty. The soldiers were Ivan Jakovljević, Pero Perković, Neđeljko Mijić, Zlatko Ladović, Ivica Petrić and Nikola Rašić. Petrić however was found guilty and sentenced to six years for the murder of a civilian in the village of Zrmanja and Rašić was sentenced to a year in prison for attempted robbery and the attempted murder of a civilian in the municipality of Knin.

The killings in the village were also included in the ICTY's indictment of former Croatian general Ante Gotovina. In the appeal of the trial of Gotovina et al which acquitted Gotovina and Mladen Markač, the ICTY ruled that there was insufficient evidence to conclude the existence of a joint criminal enterprise to remove Serb civilians by force. The Appeals Chamber further stated that the Croatian Army and Special Police committed crimes after the artillery assault, but the state and military leadership had no role in their planning and creation.
