= Varivode massacre =

1995 mass killing in Varivode, Croatia

Coordinates: 43°58′N 15°53′E

- Location: Village of Varivode, Kistanje municipality, Šibenik-Knin County, Croatia
- Date: 28 September 1995
- Target: Elderly Croatian Serb villagers
- Attack type: Mass killing
- Deaths: 9
- Perpetrators: Croatian Army (HV) and Croatian police

The Varivode massacre was a mass killing that occurred on 28 September 1995 in the village of Varivode, Croatia during the Croatian War of Independence. According to United Nations officials, soldiers of the Croatian Army (HV) and Croatian police killed nine Serb villagers, all of whom were between the ages of 60 and 85. After the war, six former Croatian soldiers were tried for committing crimes in the village, but were all eventually released due to lack of evidence. In 2012, the Supreme Court of Croatia ruled that the Republic of Croatia was responsible for the killings, dubbing the massacre an "act of terrorism," and the following year the municipal court in Knin announced that the Government of Croatia must provide compensation to the children of a couple who were murdered.

== Background ==
Following the 1990 electoral defeat of the government of the Socialist Republic of Croatia, ethnic tensions worsened. The Yugoslav People's Army (Jugoslovenska Narodna Armija – JNA) confiscated Croatia's Territorial Defence (Teritorijalna obrana) weapons to minimize resistance. On 17 August, the tensions escalated into an open revolt by Croatian Serbs, centred on the predominantly Serb-populated areas of the Dalmatian hinterland around Knin, parts of the Lika, Kordun, Banovina and eastern Croatia. This was followed by two unsuccessful attempts by Serbia, supported by Montenegro and Serbia's provinces of Vojvodina and Kosovo to obtain the Yugoslav Presidency's approval of a JNA operation to disarm Croatian security forces in January 1991. After a bloodless skirmish between Serb insurgents and Croatian special police in March, the JNA itself, supported by Serbia and its allies, asked the federal Presidency declare a state of emergency and grant the JNA wartime powers. The request was denied on 15 March, and the JNA came under control of Serbian President Slobodan Milošević. Milošević, preferring a campaign to expand Serbia rather than preservation of Yugoslavia, publicly threatened to replace the JNA with a Serbian army and declared that he no longer recognized the authority of the federal Presidency. By the end of the month, the conflict had escalated into the Croatian War of Independence. The JNA stepped in, increasingly supporting the Croatian Serb insurgents, and preventing Croatian police from intervening. In early April, the leaders of the Croatian Serb revolt declared their intention to integrate the area under their control with Serbia. The Government of Croatia viewed this declaration as an attempt to secede.

In May, the Croatian government responded by forming the Croatian National Guard (Zbor narodne garde – ZNG), but its development was hampered by a United Nations (UN) arms embargo introduced in September. On 25 June, Croatia declared independence from Yugoslavia, officially severing ties on 8 October and a month later the ZNG was renamed the Croatian Army (Hrvatska vojska - HV). Late 1991 saw the fiercest fighting of the Croatian War of Independence, culminating in the Siege of Dubrovnik and the Battle of Vukovar. A campaign of ethnic cleansing then began in the RSK, expelling 170,000 to 250,000 Croats and non-Serbs with hundreds of Croats killed. In January 1992, an agreement to implement the peace plan negotiated by UN special envoy Cyrus Vance was signed by Croatia, the JNA and the UN. As a result, the United Nations Protection Force (UNPROFOR) deployed to maintain the ceasefire, and the JNA was scheduled to retreat to Bosnia and Herzegovina. Despite the peace arrangement requiring an immediate withdrawal of JNA personnel and equipment from Croatia, the JNA remained on Croatian territory for seven to eight months. When its troops eventually withdrew, the JNA left their equipment to the Army of the Republic of Serb Krajina (ARSK), which Serbia continued to support. A state of stalemate ensued, lasting the next three-and-a-half years. In August 1995 the Croats launched Operation Storm, recapturing most Serb-controlled territory in Croatia and leading to as many as 200,000 Croatian Serbs to flee the country in fear or part of evacuation by the RSK.

== Killings ==
On the night of 28 September 1995, Croatian soldiers entered the village of Varivode and killed nine elderly Serb villagers. The civilians that were killed were Jovan Berić, Marko Berić, Milka Berić, Radivoje Berić, Marija Berić, Dušan Dukić, Jovo Berić, Špiro Berić and Mirko Pokrajac. After the executions occurred, the bodies were buried in a cemetery near the village without the knowledge of the families of the victims. There were no witnesses to the massacre, although the survivors and relatives of the victims stated that people in military uniforms arrived in the village days before the attack, and robbed and abused the remaining Serb residents who had not left following Operation Storm.

== Aftermath ==
After the massacre, Croatian authorities denied reports of widespread atrocities targeting Serbs and said that they were propaganda. Later, the government blamed the atrocities on uncontrollable elements within the Croatian Army and Croatian police. Christiane Amanpour's report from October 1995 said that the "United Nations believes 12 Serb civilians were massacred." In the first one hundred days following Operation Storm, at least 150 Serb civilians were summarily executed, and many hundreds disappeared as part of a widespread campaign of revenge against Croatia's Serb minority.

The bodies of the killed Serbs were never exhumed, autopsies were never performed and much of the evidence that could have been used against the perpetrators of the crime was discarded. Despite this, six Croatian soldiers were tried for committing crimes in the village. The soldiers were Ivan Jakovljević, Pero Perković, Neđeljko Mijić, Zlatko Ladović, Ivica Petrić and Nikola Rašić. All six were acquitted for the Varivode massacre as well as for killings in the village of Gošić, although Petrić was found guilty and sentenced to six years for the murder of a civilian in the village of Zrmanja and Rašić was sentenced to a year in prison for attempted robbery and the attempted murder of a civilian in the municipality of Knin. The acquittal part of the verdict was quashed and a re-trial was ordered which ended in the dropping of charges and release of the accused in 2002 for lack of evidence.

=== Legal proceedings ===
The Varivode massacre was listed in the ICTY's indictment of Croatian wartime general Ante Gotovina. The Trial of Gotovina et al brought the convictions of Gotovina and Markač and acquittal of Čermak in April 2011. Gotovina and Markač were subsequently acquitted on appeal in November 2012, with the Appeals Chamber of the ICTY reversing the earlier judgement, ruling that there was insufficient evidence to prove the existence of a joint criminal enterprise to remove Serb civilians by force. The Appeals Chamber further stated that the Croatian Army and Special Police committed crimes after the artillery assault, but the state and military leadership had no role in their planning and creation.

In July 2012, the Supreme Court of Croatia ruled that the Republic of Croatia was responsible for the deaths of the nine Serb villagers who were killed in Varivode. The Supreme Court declared, "two months after the conclusion of Operation Storm, an act of terrorism was committed against the Serb inhabitants of Varivode for the purpose of causing fear, hopelessness and to spread feelings of personal insecurity among the citizens."

On 23 January 2013, the municipal court in Knin upheld that the Croatian government of the time was responsible for the killings in Varivode, and reiterated that the killings were an act of terrorism against the Serb inhabitants of the village. Furthermore, the court announced that the Croatian government must pay 540,000 kuna (€ 72,000) to the children of massacre-victims Radivoje and Marija Berić. The European Commission welcomed the court's ruling, stating that the court had "addressed for the first time a long-standing grievance."

=== Commemoration ===
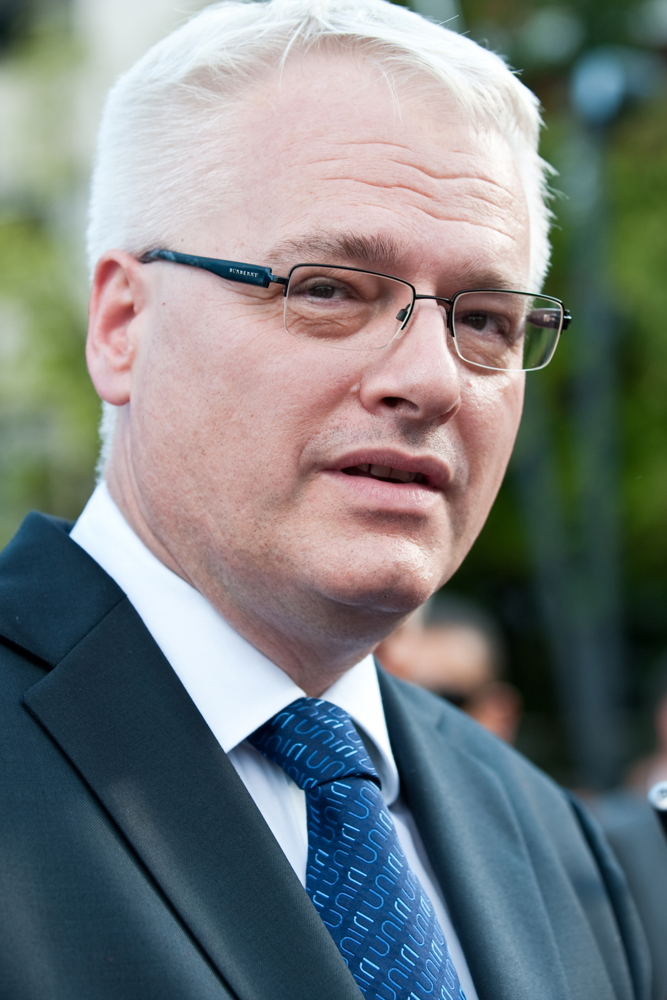
Croatian President Ivo Josipović condemned the killings in 2010.

A wooden monument was erected to commemorate the victims of the massacre. In April 2010, the plaque was destroyed by a Croatian war veteran and had to be rebuilt. The monument's destruction was condemned by then-Croatian Prime Minister Jadranka Kosor. "The Prime Minister called on the Interior Ministry and other institutions to launch an immediate investigation and to solve the case immediately, in order for the perpetrators to be found and punished for this act of vandalism," the Croatian government stated. The rebuilt monument was unveiled by Croatian President Ivo Josipović on 10 May 2010. The new monument is built out of stone, has the names of the victims inscribed in both the Latin and Cyrillic alphabets, stands ten meters tall and cost the Croatian government 60,000 kuna to construct.

The Croatian President stated, "retaliation, robbery and crime are impermissible, and the blood and shame cannot be washed away." The nine Serbs were killed at a time when there was no war and they were innocent victims of retaliation, Josipović said while addressing the crowd of several hundred people after laying flowers at the monument. Milorad Pupovac, a Croatian Serb MP and president of the Serb National Council, stated, "We have decided to erect this monument for those who have been forgotten, for those whose suffering has gone unrecognized. We hope that the individuals responsible for this crime will be brought to justice and that the ones who tolerated it will show themselves. The possibility is open that we all, the Orthodox and Catholics, Croats and Serbs, after the erection of this monument to the ethnic Serbs civilians who suffered in the 1991–1995 war, can motion away from these things so that they no longer divide us so that we can all feel a mutual-responsibility to ensure that these crimes never happen again."
