= Coalition of Refugee Associations in the Republic of Serbia =

Organization and political party in Serbia

The Coalition of Refugee Associations in the Republic of Serbia (Serbian: Коалиција удружења избјеглица у Републици Србији, romanized: Koalicija Udruženja Izbjeglica u Republici Srbiji; abbr. КУИРС or KUIRS) is a coalition of refugee organizations in Serbia that briefly operated as a political party in 2012. Miodrag Linta, the coalition's leader at the time, was elected to the National Assembly of Serbia in the 2012 Serbian parliamentary election on the electoral list of the Serbian Progressive Party (Srpska napredna stranka, SNS). The KUIRS has not been active in recent years and its current status is unclear.

== History and mandate ==
The KUIRS was established on 18 December 2008 to represent organizations of Serb refugees from the Republic of Croatia and Bosnia and Hercegovina that were formed during and after the Yugoslav Wars of the early 1990s. Most of the coalition's focus was on the concerns of Serb refugees from Croatia. In an early petition, the KUIRS called for the restitution of refugee property, reconstruction of property destroyed in the war, compensation for property losses, restitution of tenancy rights or compensation, and other related matters.

In January 2010, the KUIRS endorsed the Serbian government's decision to bring charges of genocide against Croatia at the International Court of Justice (ICJ), relating to events in the Croatian War of the 1990s. (Croatia had previously introduced similar charges against Serbia.) The coalition stressed the need for Serbia and Croatia to have proper neighbourly relations but added that the Serbian government's action could allow for the truth to be determined about contested events between 1991 and 1995. The ICJ ultimately ruled that there was insufficient evidence to support the charge either country had committed genocide.

The KUIRS rejected calls for the Serbian parliament to specifically condemn the Srebrenica massacre, instead calling for the assembly to condemn war crimes committed by all sides in the 1990s conflicts. It later criticized an official statement issued on the occasion of Serbian president Boris Tadić's visit to Vukovar in November 2010, charging that it only recognized Croat victims from 1991 siege in the city and ignored victims from the Serb community.

In December 2010, the KUIRS organized a petition against Croatia's accession to the European Union before various refugee issues were resolved. The following year, the coalition sent open letters to Croatian political parties and leading politicians to support "just" solutions to refugee concerns.

== Involvement in electoral politics ==
The KUIRS took part in the 2012 Serbian parliamentary election as part of the Progressive Party's Let's Get Serbia Moving coalition. Miodrag Linta was given the nineteenth position on the SNS-led list and was elected when it won seventy-three mandates. The Progressives formed a coalition government after the election, and Linta served as part of the government's parliamentary majority. The KUIRS also appeared on the SNS lists in some Serbian municipalities, including Topola, in the concurrent 2012 Serbian local elections.

Linta was re-elected to the national assembly in the 2014 parliamentary election after receiving the forty-third position on the SNS-led list, which won 158 mandates. He stood down as president of the KUIRS in November 2015 and was succeeded by Mile Šapić.

It is not clear if the coalition has been active since the end of 2016.
