= Smrdelje =

Smrdelje Смрдеље
- Village
- Location of Biovičino Selo in Croatia
- Coordinates: 43°56′13″N 15°53′47″E
- Country: Croatia
- County: Šibenik-Knin County
- Municipality: Kistanje

Area
  - Total: 13.5 km^{2} (5.2 sq mi)
- Elevation: 229 m (751 ft)

Population (2021)
  - Total: 90
  - Density: 6.7/km^{2} (17/sq mi)
- Time zone: UTC+1 (CET)
  - Summer (DST): UTC+2 (CEST)
- Postal code: 22319 Đevrske

Smrdelje (Serbian Cyrillic: Смрдеље) is a small village located 8 km southwest of Kistanje, in the continental part of Šibenik-Knin County, Croatia.

The broader area of the village comprises several prehistoric tumuli. The remains of Roman architecture are found on two localities, as well as several graves from the early Croatian period. The largest graveyard was on a place called Debeljak, where the Croatian pagan burials from the 8th or 9th century have been established. The archaeological site also includes early Croatian graves from the 9th or 10th century.
