= Church of Saint Anthony of Padua, Nunić =

Parish Church of Saint Anthony of Padua
- Župna crkva svetog Antuna Padovanskog
- Location: Nunić
- Country: Croatia
- Denomination: Roman Catholic

History
- Status: Parish church
- Dedication: Saint Anthony of Padua

Architecture
- Functional status: Active
- Completed: 14th century

Administration
- Archdiocese: Archdiocese of Zadar
- Parish: Parish of Saint Anthony of Padua - Nunić

The Church of Saint Anthony of Padua (Croatian: Crkva svetog Antuna Padovanskog) is a Roman Catholic church in Nunić, Croatia.

== History ==
The church was built in the 14th century. Inside of it there is a tombstone from 1203, which means on that place was church in old Croatian era.

It was renovated in 1971.

During the Croatian War of Independence it was completely robbed by Serbs. Also was damaged part of the church inventory and destroyed picture of Saint Anthony (from 1856).

In 1999 it was again renovated. The church serves as rehab centre for drug dependency and is run by Roman Catholic priests.
