= Church of Our Lady of Health, Kistanje =

Parish Church of Our Lady of Health
- Župna crkva Gospe od Zdravlja
- Parish Church of Our Lady of Health
- 43°59′N 15°58′E
- Location: Kistanje
- Country: Croatia
- Denomination: Roman Catholic

History
- Status: Parish church
- Dedicated: 1895; 131 years ago

Architecture
- Functional status: Active
- Completed: 1894

Administration
- Archdiocese: Archdiocese of Zadar

The Church of Our Lady of Health (Croatian: Crkva Gospe od Zdravlja) is a Roman Catholic church in Kistanje, Croatia.

== History ==
The church was built in 1894.

It was dedicated in 1895 by Grgur Rajčević, archbishop of Zadar.

In 1995 it was renovated.

== Description ==
The church has stone altar according to wall with wooden tabernacle and image of Our Lady of Health. It also have wooden altar with ambon according to people, with wooden statues of Saint Joseph and Virgin Mary with Child and gypsum statue of the Sacred Heart of Jesus.

The church also have stone baptistery and stone stoups.

== See also ==
- Church of Saint Nicholas, Kistanje
