= Gošić =

Gošić Гошић (Serbian)
- Village
- Interactive map of Gošić
- Location of Gošić in Croatia
- Coordinates: 43.98°N 15.83°E
- Country: Croatia
- Region: Adriatic Croatia
- County: Šibenik-Knin County
- Municipality: Kistanje

Area
  - Total: 4.5 km^{2} (1.7 sq mi)

Population (2021)
  - Total: 21
  - Density: 4.7/km^{2} (12/sq mi)

Gošić (Serbian Cyrillic: Гошић) is a hamlet in the municipality of Kistanje, Šibenik-Knin County, in the Bukovica region of Croatia.

== History ==
8 Serb civilians in the village of Gošić were shot and killed on 27 August 1995, in the aftermath of the Croatian Army's Operation Storm.

== Demographics ==
According to the 2011 population census, the population of Gošić was made up of only 46 returnees. This represents 42.99% of its pre-war population according to the 1991 census.

According to the 1991 census, 99.07% of the village population were ethnic Serbs (106/107).

Population change 1857-2011
v

| population | 116 | | 135 | 158 | 186 | 226 | 230 | 253 | 230 | 238 | 210 | 158 | 116 | 107 | 24 | 46 |
| | 1857 | 1869 | 1880 | 1890 | 1900 | 1910 | 1921 | 1931 | 1948 | 1953 | 1961 | 1971 | 1981 | 1991 | 2001 | 2011 |

Sources: Croatian Bureau of Statistics publications
