= Zečevo, Kistanje =

Settlement in Šibenik-Knin County, Croatia

Zečevo
- Settlement
- Interactive map of Zečevo
- Location of Zečevo in Croatia
- Coordinates: 43°58′57″N 15°52′07″E
- Country: Croatia
- County: Šibenik-Knin
- Municipality: Kistanje

Area
  - Total: 11.3 km^{2} (4.4 sq mi)

Population (2021)
  - Total: 24
  - Density: 2.1/km^{2} (5.5/sq mi)
- Time zone: UTC+1 (CET)
  - Summer (DST): UTC+2 (CEST)
- Postal code: 22300 Knin
- Area code: +385 (0)22

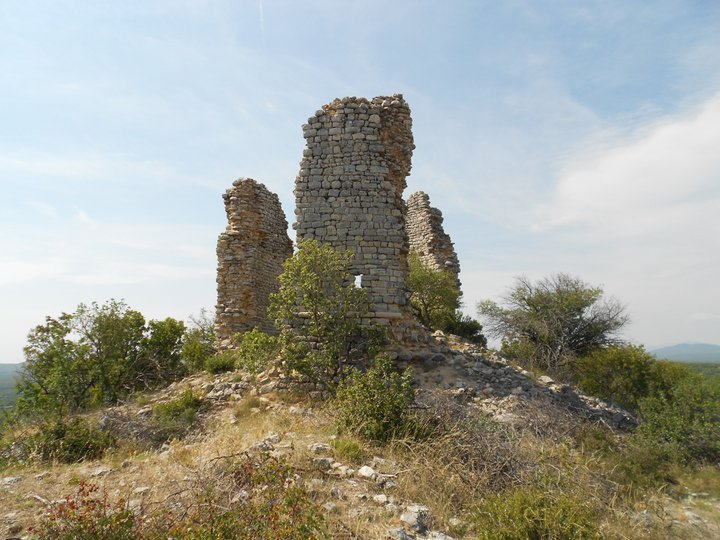
Zečevo tower, Croatia.

Zečevo is a settlement in the Municipality of Kistanje in Croatia. In 2021, its population was 24.

== Demographics ==
Zečevo: Population trends 1857–2021
v

population	214		250	280	334	394	190	379	393	405	403	340	272	218	41	63	24
	1857	1869	1880	1890	1900	1910	1921	1931	1948	1953	1961	1971	1981	1991	2001	2011	2021

Sources: Croatian Bureau of Statistics publications
