= Varivode =

Varivode Вариводе (Serbian)
- Village
- Location within Croatia
- Coordinates: 43°58′N 15°53′E
- Country: Croatia
- Region: Adriatic Croatia
- County: Šibenik-Knin County
- Municipality: Kistanje

Area
  - Total: 9.9 km^{2} (3.8 sq mi)

Population (2021)
  - Total: 61
  - Density: 6.2/km^{2} (16/sq mi)

Varivode (Serbian Cyrillic: Вариводе) is a village in the municipality of Kistanje, Šibenik-Knin County, Croatia. In the aftermath of Operation Storm in 1995 the village was the site of the Varivode massacre.

== History ==
Prior to the Croatian War of Independence (1991–1995), Varivode was part of the municipality of Knin, and according to the census of 1991, it had a population of 477. During the war, Varivode and its surroundings were occupied by the self-proclaimed Republic of Serbian Krajina. On 28 September 1995, almost two months after Operation Storm, men in Croatian military uniforms and armed civilians killed between 9 and 12 elderly Serb civilians, some of whom were disabled.

In 2010, a monument was erected in the village to commemorate the civilians killed in the massacre. It was damaged in April 2010. The monument was later reconstructed, and in October 2010, inaugurated in the presence of the President of Croatia, Ivo Josipović, and Serbia's Minister for the Diaspora, Mlađan Đorđević. The inscription on the monument reads: "To the innocent and brutally murdered villagers of Varivode from 28 September 1995" (Serbian Cyrillic: Недужним и мучки убијеним мјештанима Варивода 28. 9. 1995.).

In 2020, the Prime Minister of Croatia, Andrej Plenković, and representatives of the country’s Serb minority commemorated the 25th anniversary of the massacre.

Every year during the summer months, Varivode receives Serbs from around the world who return to their place of origin. The village's patron saint is St. Elias (Serbian: Sveti Ilija), celebrated on 2 August.

== Demographics ==
In the 2011 Croatian census, Varivode had 124 inhabitants. According to 2001 Croatian census, Varivode had 93 inhabitants. In 1991, there were 477 inhabitants, out of whom 472 were ethnic Serbs.

Population change 1857-2011
v

population	384		442	497	620	646	650	729	720	755	751	655	546	477	93	124
	1857	1869	1880	1890	1900	1910	1921	1931	1948	1953	1961	1971	1981	1991	2001	2011

Sources: Croatian Bureau of Statistics publications

== See also ==
- Varivode massacre
- Kistanje municipality
