= Djamaat =

A djamaat is a politically organized community in Dagestan, Russia, usually a village or a group of villages with a historical connection.

== Overview ==
The djamaat is a centuries-old political unit, traditionally consisting of up to ten tribal or ancestral structures known as tuhums, which are broadly extended families. The government of a djamaat traditionally consisted of the elders from each of the tuhums. The djamaats were, in turn, governed by the adat (common law, prescriptions). The role of the djamaats in Dagestani history has been compared with that of the poleis in Ancient Greece. Although members of the djamaat often spoke the same language, ethnicity was not the primary connecting factor.

The role of the djamaats faded after the new 1994 constitution of Dagestan, which provided other sources of authority in the republic, but the djamaats re-emerged when the national movement weakened. The Dagestani political life began to be dominated by "ethnoparties", whose key positions were often filled by djamaat members. The Dagestani djamaat, with its transcending kinship and ethnic structures, has been seen as a stabilizing factor in the political life of this ethnically and culturally diverse region.

== Sources ==
- Ware, Robert Bruce; Kisriev, Enver (2010). Dagestan: Russian Hegemony and Islamic Resistance in the North Caucasus. M.E.Sharpe. ISBN 978-0-7656-2028-6.
