= Bukovica, Dalmatia =

Coordinates: 44°08′54″N 15°45′07″E

Bukovica
- Geographic region^{a}
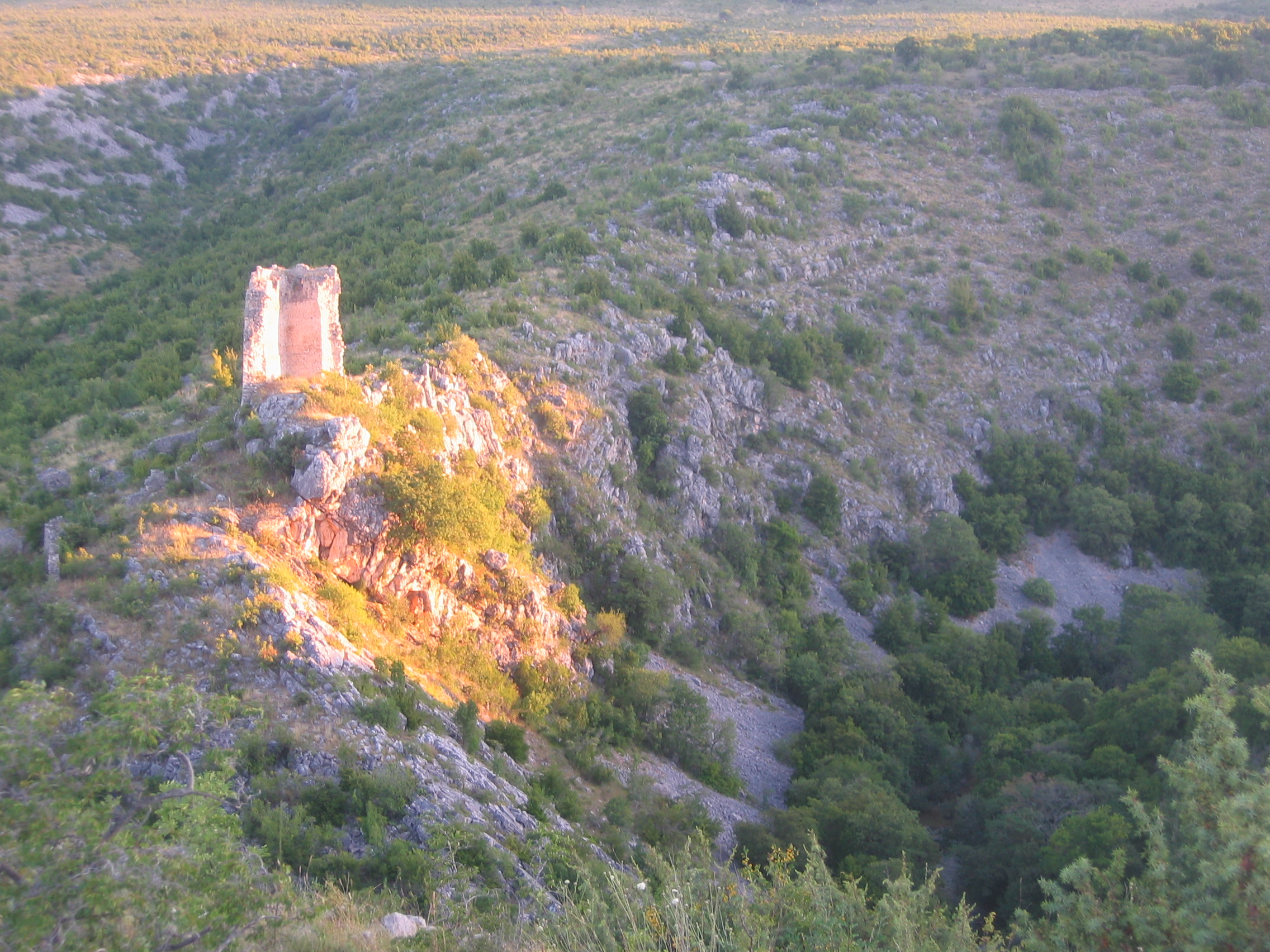
- Typical Bukovica landscape: Keglević family castle ruins near Mokro Polje in northeastern Bukovica
- Etymology: Croatian: bukva, lit. 'beech tree'
- Interactive map of Bukovica
- Country: Croatia
- Largest towns: Obrovac, Kistanje
- ^{a} Bukovica is not designated as an official region, it is a geographic region only.

Bukovica is a geographical region in Croatia. It lies in northern Dalmatia, with Lika to the north, Kninska Krajina to the east, and Ravni Kotari to the southwest.

== History ==
Vlachs were recorded among the inhabitants of the region in 1420. Their basic economic activity was related to transhumant livestock breeding in conjunction with carrying merchants’ goods.

Many Vlachs (also recorded as Morlachs) moved to the Ottoman areas in the Dalmatian hinterland which were occupied by 1573 from Bukovica.

== Geography ==
Bukovica is a small plateau region about 250 to 300 meters above sea level. The karst landscape covers most of the region up to the Zrmanja valley.

== Towns and villages ==
Bukovica covers a triangular area between the towns of Benkovac, Obrovac, and Knin. The region includes the municipalities of Jasenice, Ervenik, Kistanje, and Lišane Ostrovičke.

== See also ==
- Geography of Croatia
